= List of Greeks by net worth =

List of Greek billionaires

Hellenic Republic (Greece)
- Flag Coat of arms
- GDP (PPP): 2025 estimate
  - Total: ▲$466.95 billion (54th)
  - Per capita: ▲$44,990 (48th)
- GDP (nominal): 2025 estimate
  - Total: ▲$282.02 billion (50th)
  - Per capita: ▲$27,170 (45th)
- Currency: Euro (€) Economy of Greece

The following is a list of Greek billionaires. It is based on an annual assessment of wealth and assets compiled and published by Forbes magazine in March every year.

== 2025 ==
Source: 2025 The World's Billionaires

Ranking in Greece	World position	Name	Citizenship	Net worth (USD)	Sources of wealth
1	479	Maria Angelicoussis	Greece	$7.6 billion	Daughter of John Angelicoussis; CEO of the Angelicoussis Group (shipping)
2	793	Evangelos Marinakis & family	Greece	$5.1 billion	owns shipping group Capital Maritime Trading Corp.
3	903	George Economou	Greece	$4.5 billion	Greek shipping tycoon who owns several privately held firms under his TMS Group, DryShips, and Ocean Rig
4	1097	George Prokopiou & Family	Greece	$3.7 billion	Shipping owner of Dynacom Tankers, Sea Traders and Dynagas
5	1189	Spiro Latsis & Family	Greece	$3.4 billion	Son of Yiannis "John Spyridon" Latsis, owner of EFG International (investment banking), major shareholder in Lamda Development (real estate developer in Greece)
6	1224	Aristotelis "Telis" Mistakidis	Greece	$3.3 billion	Mining, commodities (owns 3% Glencore), banking (owns 5% Piraeus Bank)
7	1411	Philip Niarchos	Greece; France	$2.8 billion	Art collection (Stavros Niarchos Foundation)
8	1566	Panagiotis Tsakos & family	Greece	$2.5 billion	Founder of Tsakos Group, an Athens-based shipping company
9	1587	Anna Angelicoussis & family	Greece	$2.5 billion	Owns Greek shipping firms Alpha Bulkers, Alpha Gas and Pantheon Tankers Management
10	1723	Ioannis Papalekas	Greece	$2.3 billion	Greek real estate investor and the largest shareholder Yoda Group
11	1738	Marianna Latsis & Family	Greece	$2.3 billion	Daughter of Yiannis "John Spyridon" Latsis, owner of Latsco Shipping, major real estate investments with GEK Terna
12	1752	Constantinos Martinos & Family	Greece	$2.2 billion	Shipping
13	1962	Evangelos Mytilineos	Greece	$2 billion	CEO of Metlen Energy & Metals
14	2073	Athanasios Martinos & Family	Greece	$1.9 billion	owner of Greek shipping firm Eastern Mediterranean Maritime
15	2153	Andreas Martinos & Family	Greece	$1.8 billion	owner of Greek shipping firm Minerva Marine
16	2492	Margarita Latsis Catsiapis & family	Greece	$1.5 billion	fortune from her late father, Greek shipping tycoon John S. Latsis alongside siblings Marianna and Spiro.
17	3051	Diamantis Diamantides & Family	Greece	$1.1 billion	owns Greek shipping firms Delta Tankers and Marmaras Navigation

== 2024 ==
Source: 2024 The World's Billionaires

Ranking in Greece	World position	Name	Citizenship	Net worth (USD)	Sources of wealth
1	513	Maria Angelicoussis	Greece	$6.4 billion	Daughter of John Angelicoussis; CEO of the Angelicoussis Group (shipping)
2	717	George Economou	Greece	$4.8 billion	Greek shipping tycoon who owns several privately held firms under his TMS Group and Dryships
3	928	Evangelos Marinakis & family	Greece	$3.8 billion	owns shipping group Capital Maritime Trading Corp.
4	997	Aristotelis "Telis" Mistakidis	Greece	$3.5 billion	Mining, commodities (owns 3% Glencore), banking (owns 5% Piraeus Bank)
5	1235	Philip Niarchos	Greece; France	$2.8 billion	Art collection (Stavros Niarchos Foundation)
6	1340	George Prokopiou & Family	Greece	$2.6 billion	Shipping owner of Dynacom Tankers, Sea Traders and Dynagas
7	1442	Vardis Vardinoyannis & Family	Greece	$2.4 billion	Oil and gas (Motor Oil Hellas and Vegas Oil and Gas), owns Star Channel and Alpha TV, banking (owns Optima Bank, Vista Bank), owns NJV Athens Plaza
8	1472	Constantinos Martinos & Family	Greece	$2.3 billion	Shipping
9	1569	Spiro Latsis & Family	Greece	$2.2 billion	Son of Yiannis "John Spyridon" Latsis, owner of EFG International (investment banking), major shareholder in Lamda Development (real estate developer in Greece)
10	1896	Andreas Martinos & Family	Greece	$1.8 billion	owner of Greek shipping firm Minerva Marine
11	1908	Marianna Latsis & Family	Greece	$1.8 billion	Daughter of Yiannis "John Spyridon" Latsis, owner of Latsco Shipping, major real estate investments with GEK Terna
12	2153	Athanasios Martinos & Family	Greece	$1.5 billion	owner of Greek shipping firm Eastern Mediterranean Maritime
13	2395	Ioannis Papalekas	Greece	$1.3 billion	Greek real estate investor and the largest shareholder Yoda Group
14	2542	Diamantis Diamantides & Family	Greece	$1.2 billion	owns Greek shipping firms Delta Tankers and Marmaras Navigation

== 2023 ==
Source: 2023 The World's Billionaires

Ranking in Greece	World position	Name	Citizenship	Net worth (USD)	Sources of wealth
1	455	Maria Angelicoussis	Greece	5.6 billion	Daughter of John Angelicoussis; CEO of the Angelicoussis Group (shipping)
2	905	Aristotelis "Telis" Mistakidis	Greece	3.2 billion	Mining, commodities (owns 3% Glencore), banking (owns 5% Piraeus Bank)
3	1067	Philip Niarchos	Greece; France	$2.8 billion	Art collection (Stavros Niarchos Foundation)
4	1575	Vardis Vardinoyannis & Family	Greece	1.9 billion	Oil and gas (Motor Oil Hellas and Vegas Oil and Gas), owns Star Channel and Alpha TV, banking (owns Optima Bank, Vista Bank), owns NJV Athens Plaza
5	1804	Marianna Latsis & Family	Greece	1.6 billion	Daughter of Yiannis "John Spyridon" Latsis, owner of Latsco Shipping, major real estate investments with GEK Terna
6	1905	Spiro Latsis & Family	Greece	1.5 billion	Son of Yiannis "John Spyridon" Latsis, owner of EFG International (investment banking), major shareholder in Lamda Development (real estate developer in Greece)

== 2022 ==
Source: 2022 The World's Billionaires

Greece Ranking	World Ranking	Name	Citizenship	Net worth (USD)	Sources of wealth and occupation
1	381	Vicky Safra	Greece; Brazil	$7.2 billion	Inherited from her late husband, Brazilian banker Joseph Safra
2	1125	Aristotelis "Telis" Mistakidis	Greece; United Kingdom	$2.9 billion	Mining, commodities (owns 3% Glencore), banking (owns 5% Piraeus Bank)
3	1163	Philip Niarchos	Greece; France	$2.8 billion	Art collection (Stavros Niarchos Foundation)
4	2128	Vardis Vardinoyannis & Family	Greece	$1.4 billion	Oil and gas (Motor Oil Hellas and Vegas Oil and Gas), owns Star Channel and Alpha TV, banking (owns Optima Bank, Vista Bank), owns NJV Athens Plaza

== 2021 ==
Source: 2021 The World's Billionaires

Greece Ranking	World Ranking	Name	Citizenship	Net worth (USD)	Sources of wealth and occupation
1	365	Vicky Safra	Greece; Brazil	$7.5 billion	Inherited from her late husband, Brazilian banker Joseph Safra
2	1147	Aristotelis "Telis" Mistakidis	Greece; United Kingdom	$2.9 billion	Mining, commodities (owns 3% Glencore), banking (owns 5% Piraeus Bank)
3	1206	Philip Niarchos	Greece; France	$2.8 billion	Art collection (Stavros Niarchos Foundation)
4	2092	Vardis Vardinoyannis & Family	Greece	$1.5 billion	Oil and gas (Motor Oil Hellas and Vegas Oil and Gas), owns Star Channel and Alpha TV, banking (owns Optima Bank, Vista Bank), owns NJV Athens Plaza

=== 2021 Greek Nationals ===
List of Greek-American, Greek-Cypriots and Greek-Russian Billionaires

List Ranking	Ranking World Ranking	Name	Citizenship	Net worth (USD)	Sources of wealth and Occupation
1	373	Jim Davis	United States; Greece	$6.9 billion	Owner of New Balance, Major League Lacrosse
2	458	Tom Gores	United States; Israel; Greece	$5.9 billion	CEO of Platinum Equity; Owner Palace Sports and Entertainment; Detroit Pistons
3	1064	John Catsimatidis	United States; Greece	$2.8 billion	Owner of Gristedes (Supermarket)
3	1478	George Argyros & family	United States; Greece	$2.1 billion	Owner of Arnel & Affiliates (real estate)
4	1758	Ivan Savvidis	Russia; Greece	$1.7 billion	Agrokom Group (Atlantis-PAK, ТАВР, AKVA DON, BETTEX, Radisson Blu Rostov); Belterra Investments (Owns 44% Port of Thessaloniki and Makedonia Palace); Owner of Dimera Group (owns OPEN TV, PAOK FC) (owns Porto Carras, Souroti, Don Plaza Rostov Hotel, Hyatt Regency Rostov Hotel)
5	2124	Filaret "Filaretos Kaltsidis" Galchev	Russia; Greece	$1 billion	Chairman of Eurocement group

== 2020 ==
Source: 2020 The World's Billionaires

Greece Ranking	World Ranking	Name	Citizenship	Net worth (USD)	Sources of wealth
1	743	Philip Niarchos	Greece; France	$2.8 billion	Art collection (Stavros Niarchos Foundation)
2	1851	Aristotelis "Telis" Mistakidis	Greece; United Kingdom	$1.1 billion	Mining, commodities (owns 3% Glencore)
3	1990	Vardis Vardinoyannis & family	Greece	$1.0 billion	Oil and gas (Motor Oil Hellas and Vegas Oil and Gas)

== 2019 ==
Source: 2019 The World's Billionaires

Greece Ranking	World Ranking	Name	Sources of wealth	Net worth (USD)
1	804	Philip Niarchos	Art collection	$2.8 billion
2	838	Spiros Latsis	Banking, shipping	$2.7 billion
3	1116	Aristotelis Mistakidis	Mining, commodities	$2.1 billion
4	1349	Vardis Vardinoyannis	Oil and gas	$1.7 billion

== 2018 ==
Source: 2018 The World's Billionaires

Greece Ranking	World Ranking	Name	Sources of wealth	Net worth (USD)
1	729	Spiros Latsis	Banking, shipping	$3.2 billion
2	859	Philip Niarchos	Art collection	$2.8 billion
3	965	Aristotelis Mistakidis	Mining, commodities	$2.5 billion
4	1999	Vardis Vardinoyannis	Oil and gas	$1.1 billion

== 2013 ==
Source: 2013 The World's Billionaires

Greece Ranking	World Ranking	Name	Sources of wealth	Net worth (USD)
1	412	Spiros Latsis & family	Banking, shipping	$3.3 billion
2	527	Aristotelis Mistakidis	Glencore International	$2.7 billion
3	554	Philip Niarchos	Art collection	$2.6 billion

== Other millionaires ==
Source: The Ultra Rich Greeks

Name	Sources of wealth	Net worth (USD)
Georgios Vernicos & Family	Grandfather of pop singer Victor Vernicos & former CEO of Vernicos Shipping	$1.3 billion
Dimitris Melissanidis	Oil, shipping	$3.4 billion (2015)
Dinos Martinos and family	Shipping	$3.2 billion (2015)
Minos Kiriakou	Shipping, media	$3 billion (2015)
Evangelos Marinakis	media, shipping	$3.1 billion
John Angelicoussis and family	Shipping	$2.4 billion (2015)
Chryss Goulandris	Shipping	$2.4 billion (2015)
George Prokopiou and family	Shipping	$2 billion (2015)
Sokratis Kokkalis	Telecommunications, construction	$1.9 billion (2015)
Evangelos Mytilineos	steel	$1.7 billion
George Economou and family	Shipping, art collector	$1.5 billion (2015)
Nikos Pateras and family	Shipping	$1.1 billion (2014)
Sklavenitis and family	Shipping, retail	$1 billion
Theodore Vassilakis	Airline	$1 billion
Pavlos Giannakopoulos and family	Pharmaceutical	$975 million
Kostas Makris	Real estate	$850 million
Theodore Angelopoulos and family	Steel, shipping, banking	$819 million
Theodoropoulos family	Good	$800 million
Athina Onassis	Shipping	$800 million
Canellopoulos Papalexopoulos and family	Cement	$771 million
Apostels Vakakis	Retail	$580 million
Nikos & Evangelos Stasinopoulos	Steel	$514 million
Yannis Costopoulos	Finance	$425.5 million
Dimitris Copelouzos	Real estate, energy, lottery	
Andreas Vgenopoulos	Banking, shipping	
George Bobolas	Media, constructions	$290 million
Vasilis Fourlis	Retail	$212 million
Angeliki Frangou	Shipping	$192 million
Sfakianakis family	Gypsum Quarries	$175 million
George Gerardos	Computers	$ 114.3 million

== See also ==
- Economy of Greece
- List of countries by number of billionaires
- List of companies of Greece
- List of wealthiest families
- List of Cypriot billionaires by net worth
