= List of people and organisations named in the Paradise Papers =

Countries with politicians, public officials or close associates implicated in the leak on 5 November 2017

This is a list of people and organisations named in the Paradise Papers as connected to offshore companies. The International Consortium of Investigative Journalists stated in their politicians database, as a disclaimer, "There are legitimate uses for offshore companies and trusts. We do not intend to suggest or imply that any people, companies or other entities included in the ICIJ Offshore Leaks Database have broken the law or otherwise acted improperly."

== Government officials ==
Current or former heads of state or government of their country as defined by their political position at the time of announcement, not whether the documents in the Papers relating to them coincided with their period of office.

=== Heads of state ===
==== Current heads of state ====
- Charles III, King of the United Kingdom and the other Commonwealth realms
- Ilham Aliyev, current President of Azerbaijan.

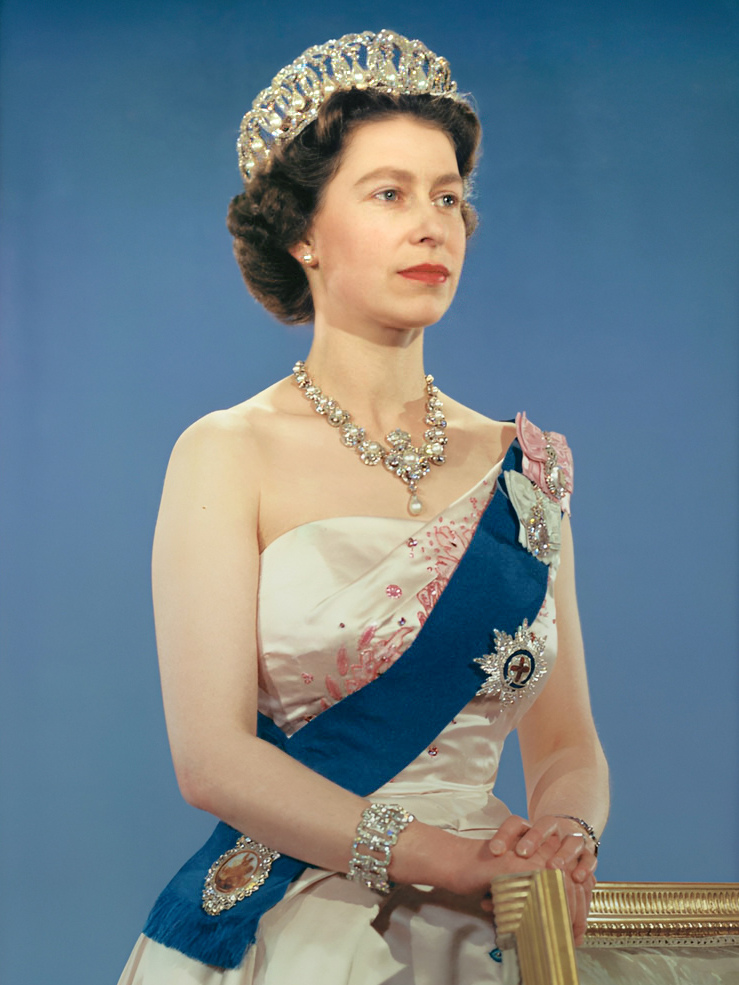
Queen Elizabeth II

- Prabowo Subianto, current President of Indonesia and chairman of the Great Indonesia Movement Party

Former heads of state

- Elizabeth II (d. 2022), former Queen of the United Kingdom and the other Commonwealth realms
- José María Figueres, former President of Costa Rica
- Juan Manuel Santos, former President of Colombia
- Ellen Johnson Sirleaf, former President of Liberia
- Petro Poroshenko, former President of Ukraine

=== Heads of government ===
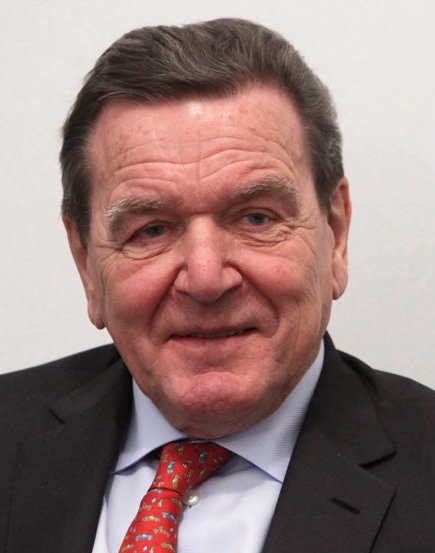
Former German Chancellor Gerhard Schröder

Former heads of government

- Shaukat Aziz, former Prime Minister of Pakistan
- Jean Chrétien, former Prime Minister of Canada
- Alfred Gusenbauer, former Chancellor of Austria
- Yukio Hatoyama, former Prime Minister of Japan
- Paul Martin, former Prime Minister of Canada
- Brian Mulroney (d. 2024), former Prime Minister of Canada
- Gerhard Schröder, former Chancellor of Germany
- Hamad bin Jassim bin Jaber Al Thani, former Prime Minister of Qatar

=== Cabinet officials ===
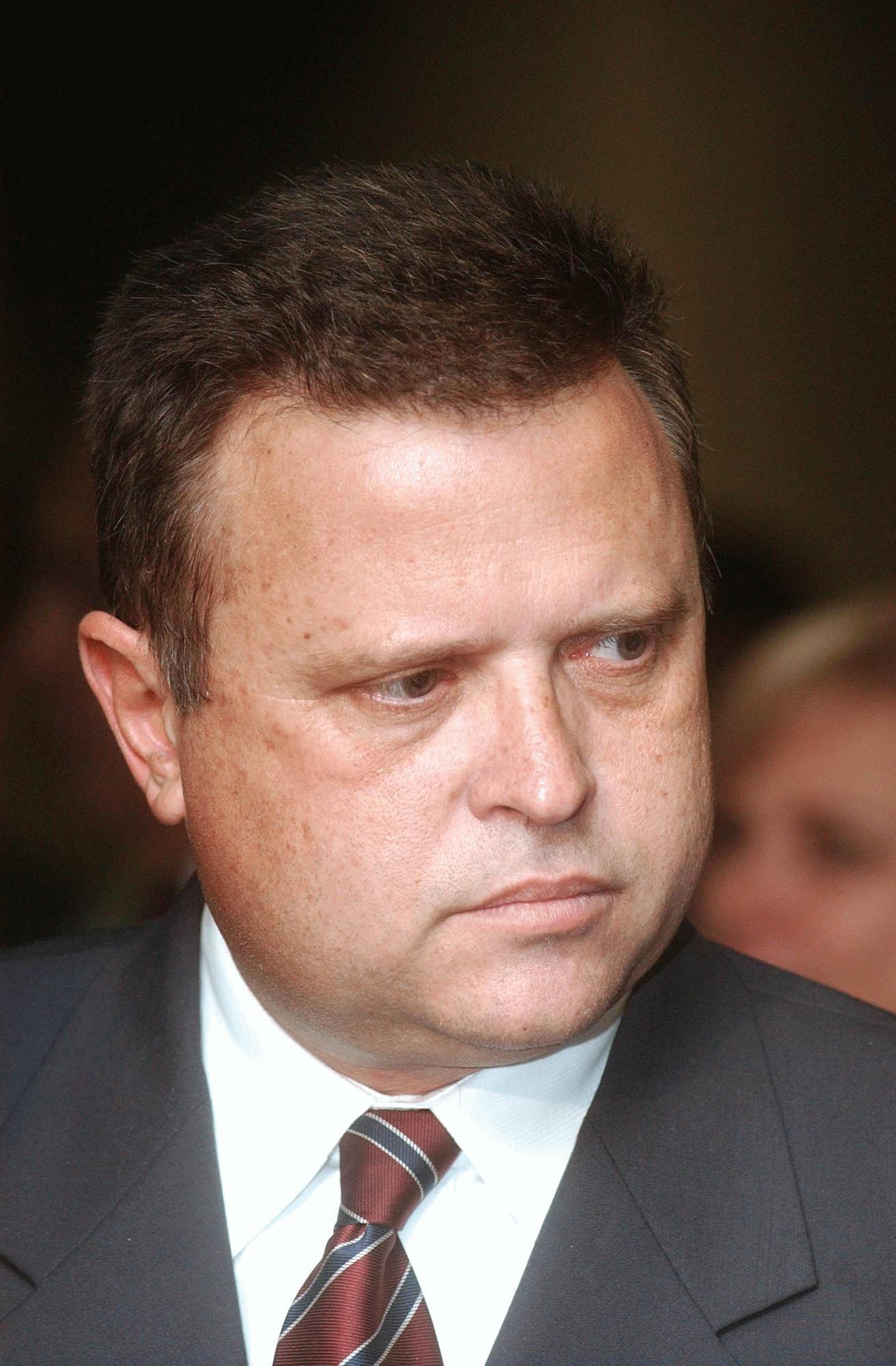
Blairo Maggi

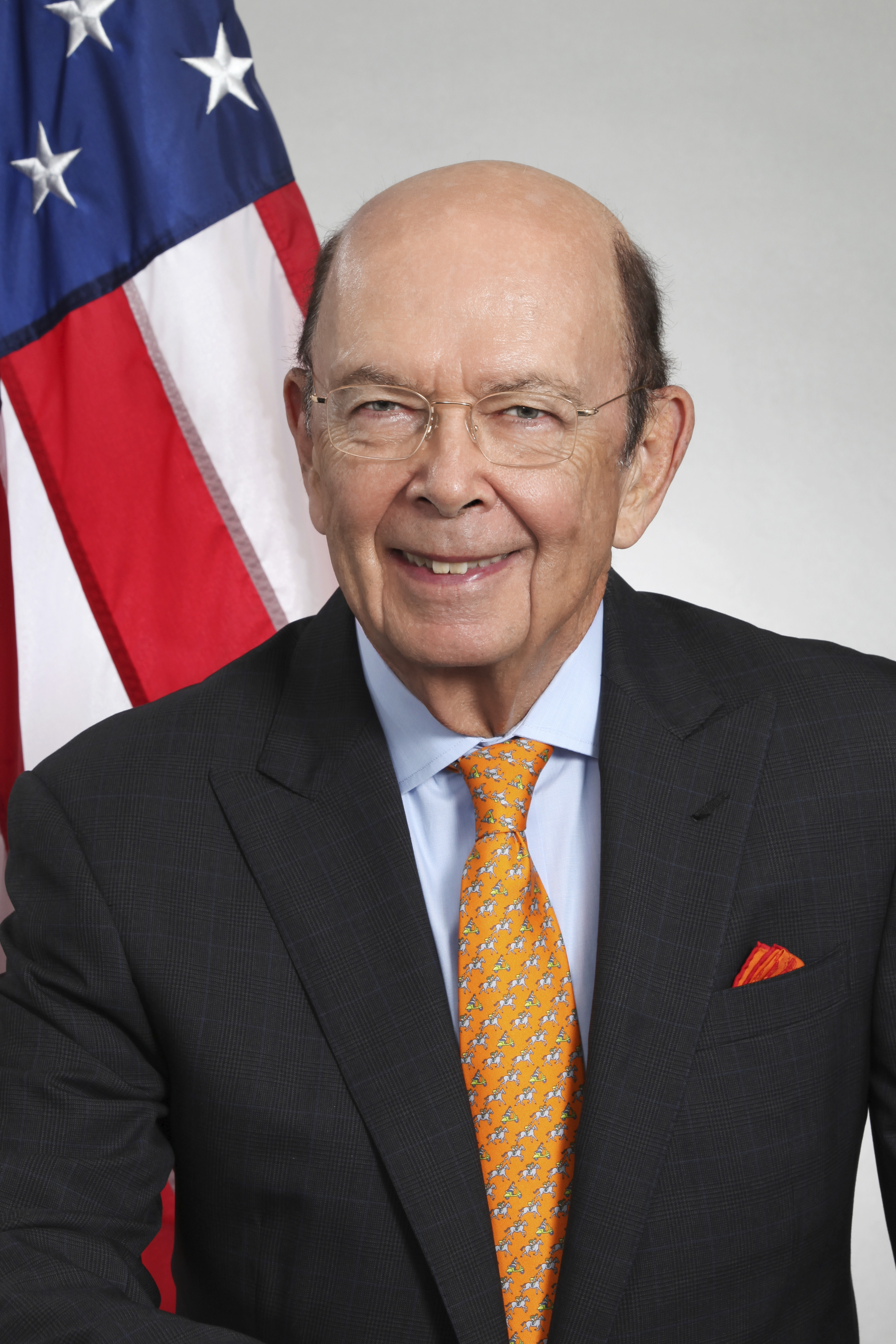
Wilbur Ross

Argentina

- (Argentina) Juan José Aranguren, Minister of Energy
- (Argentina) Luis Caputo, Minister of Finance

Brazil

- (Brazil) Blairo Maggi, Minister of Agriculture
- (Brazil) Henrique Meirelles, Minister of Finance

India

- (India) Ashok Gehlot, former Chief Minister of Rajasthan
- (India) Sachin Pilot, former Minister of Corporate Affairs
- (India) Y. S. Jaganmohan Reddy, Opposition Leader, Andhra Pradesh

Kazakhstan

- (Kazakhstan) Mukhtar Ablyazov, former Minister of Energy and Trade
- (Kazakhstan) Sauat Mynbayev, Minister of Oil and Gas

Kenya

- (Kenya) Sally Kosgei, former Minister of Agriculture

Lebanon

- (Lebanon) Adnan Kassar, former Minister of State and Minister of Economy and Trade

Mexico

- (Mexico) Pedro Aspe, former Secretary of Finance and Public Credit
- (Mexico) Alejandro Gertz Manero, former Secretary of Public Security

Serbia

- (Serbia) Nenad Popović, Minister without portfolio

United States

- (United States) Steven Mnuchin, former Secretary of the Treasury
- (United States) Penny Pritzker, former Secretary of Commerce
- (United States) Wilbur Ross, former Secretary of Commerce
- (United States) Rex Tillerson, former Secretary of State

=== Members of legislatures ===
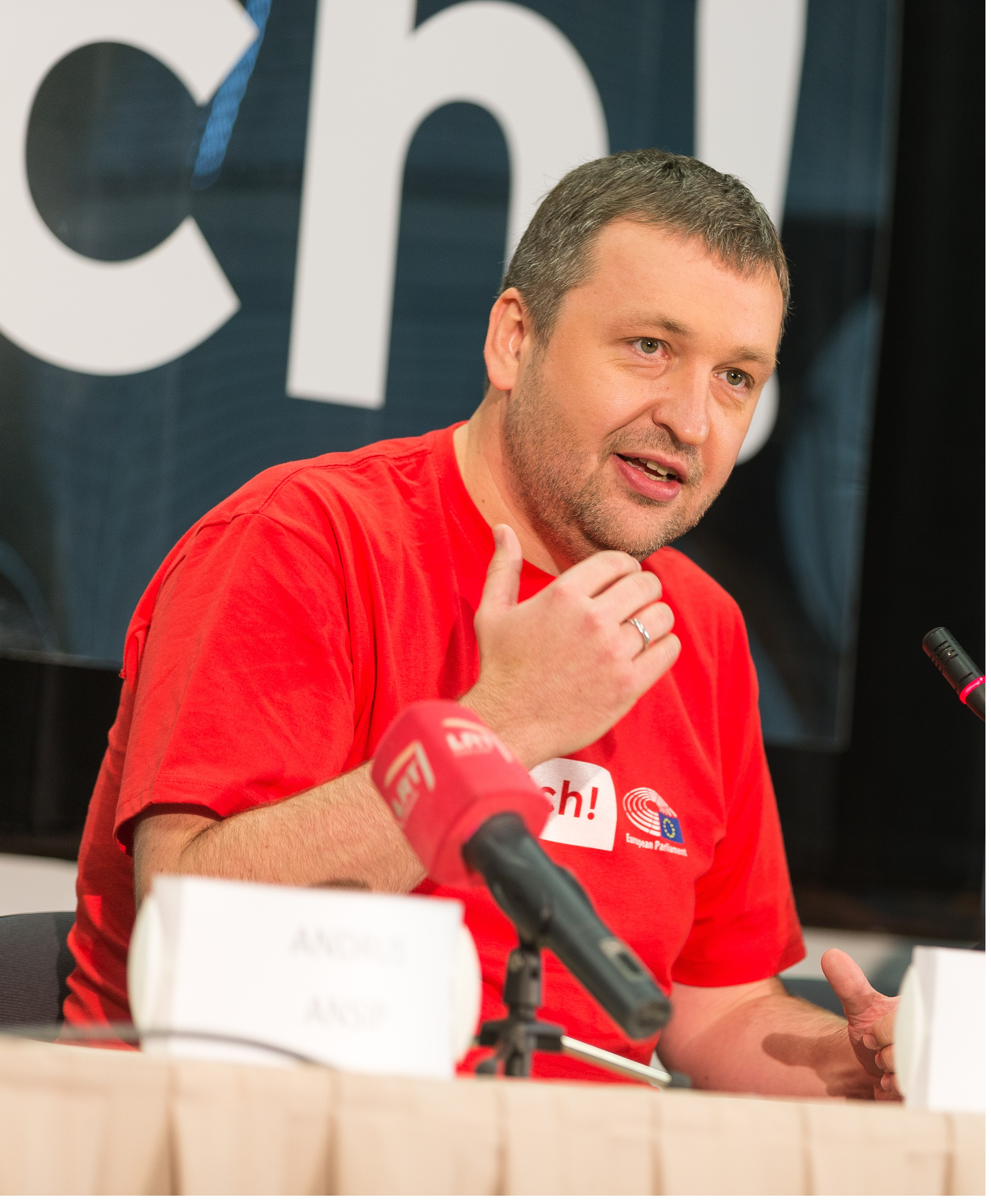
Antanas Guoga

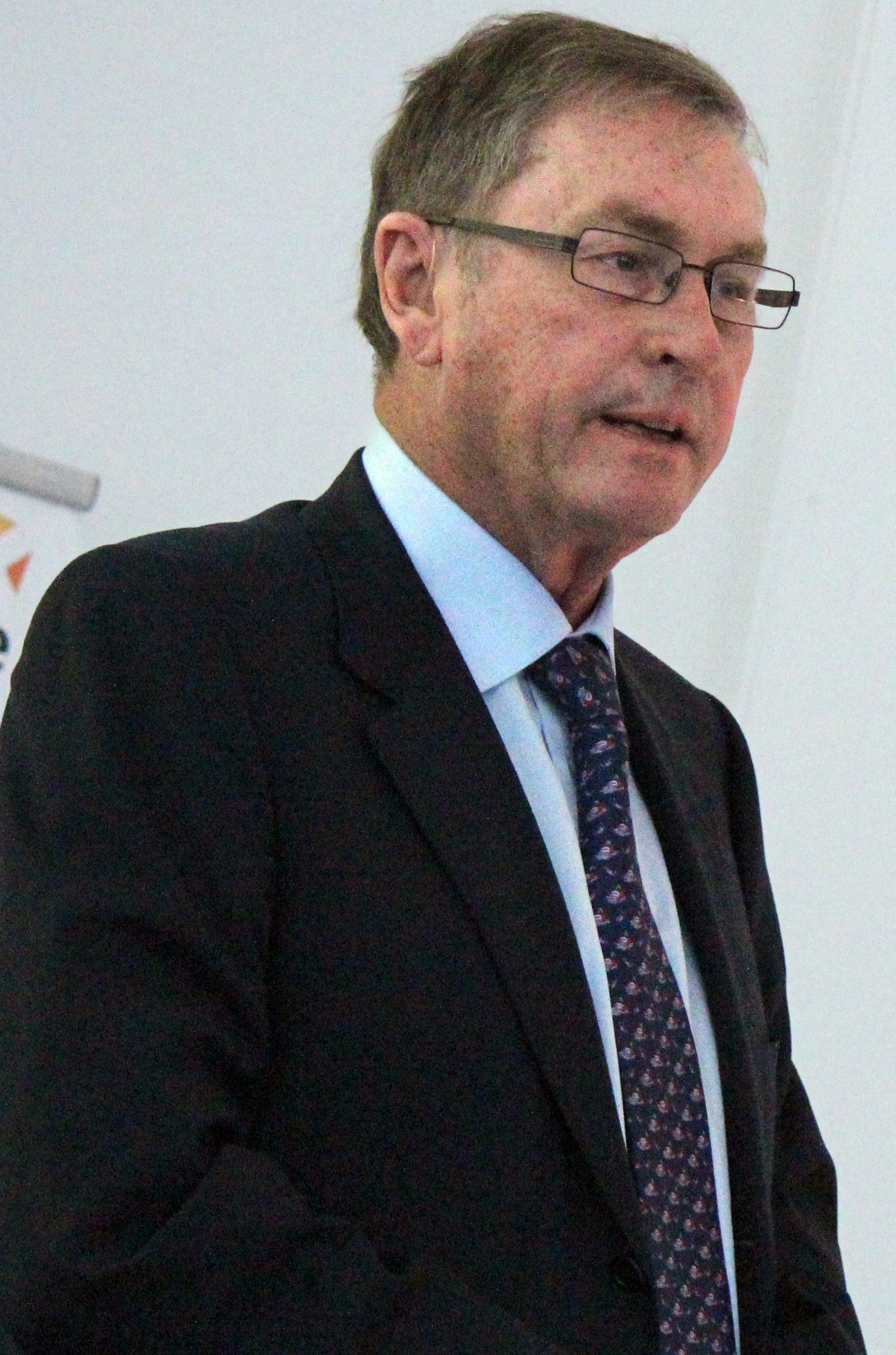
Michael Ashcroft

Canada

- (Canada) Leo Kolber, former member of the Senate

European Union

- (European Union) (Lithuania) Antanas Guoga, Member of the European Parliament

India

- (India) Vijay Mallya, former member of the Rajya Sabha and son of businessman Vittal Mallya
- (India) Jayant Sinha, member of the Lok Sabha and Minister of State for Civil Aviation
- (India) Ravindra Kishore Sinha, member of the Rajya Sabha

Iraq

- (Iraq) Mudhar Shawkat, former member of the Council of Representatives

Japan

- (Japan) Masamitsu Naito, member of the House of Councillors
- (Japan) Taro Yamada, former member of the House of Councillors

Mexico

- (Mexico) Joaquín Gamboa Pascoe, former member of the Senate and Chamber of Deputies

Nigeria

- Bukola Saraki, former President of the Senate of Nigeria

Russia

- (Russia) Alexey Ezubov, member of the State Duma
- (Russia) Aleksandr Skorobogatko, former member of the State Duma

Spain

- (Spain) Pablo Crespo, former member of Parliament of Galicia and implicated in the Gürtel case

Ukraine

- (Ukraine) Anton Pryhodsky, former member of the Verkhovna Rada

United Kingdom

- (United Kingdom) Michael Ashcroft, former member of the House of Lords
- (United Kingdom) George Magan, member of the House of Lords
- (United Kingdom) Jacob Rees-Mogg, former member of the House of Commons
- (United Kingdom) James Sassoon, member of the House of Lords and former Commercial Secretary to the Treasury

=== Other government officials ===
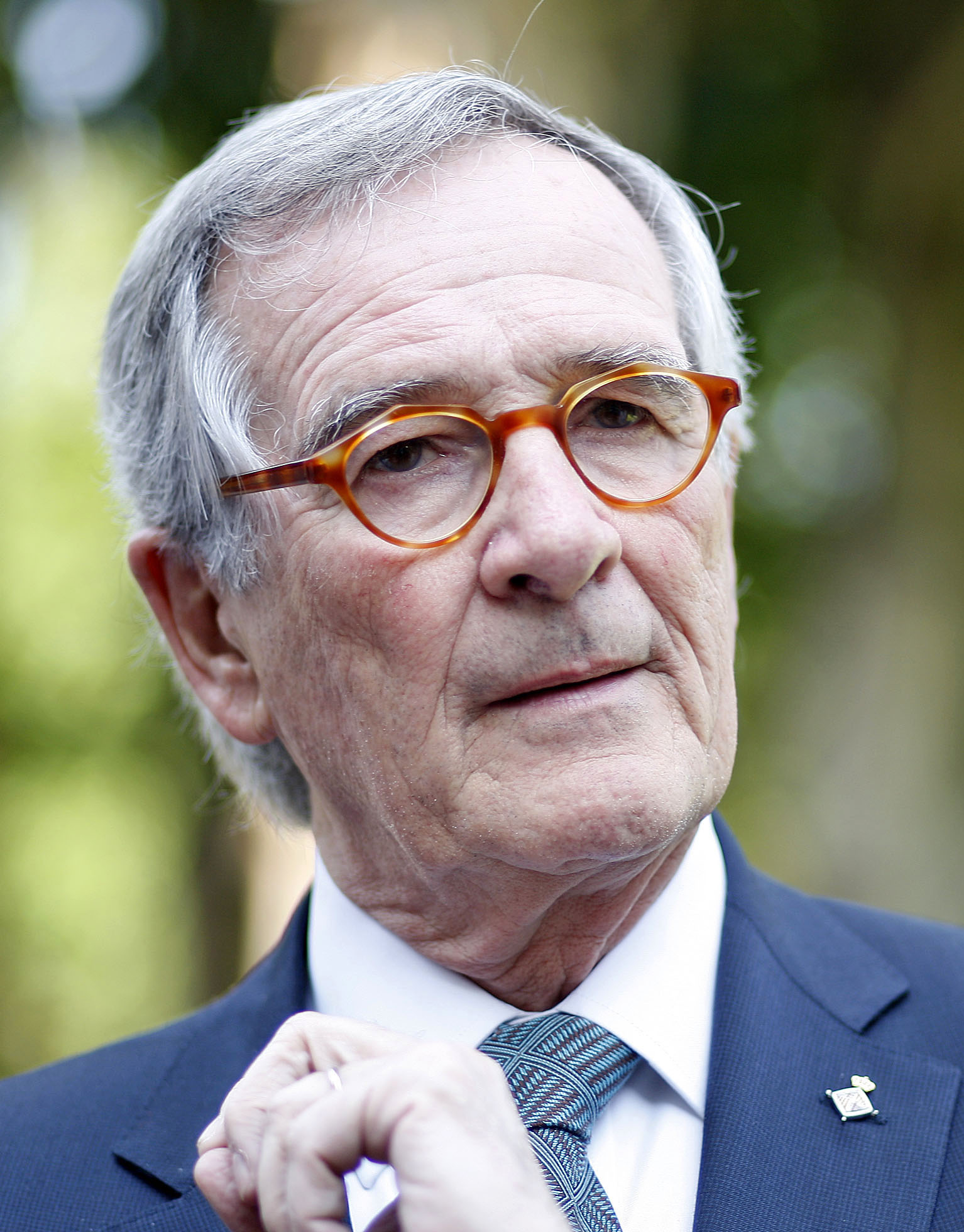
Xavier Trias

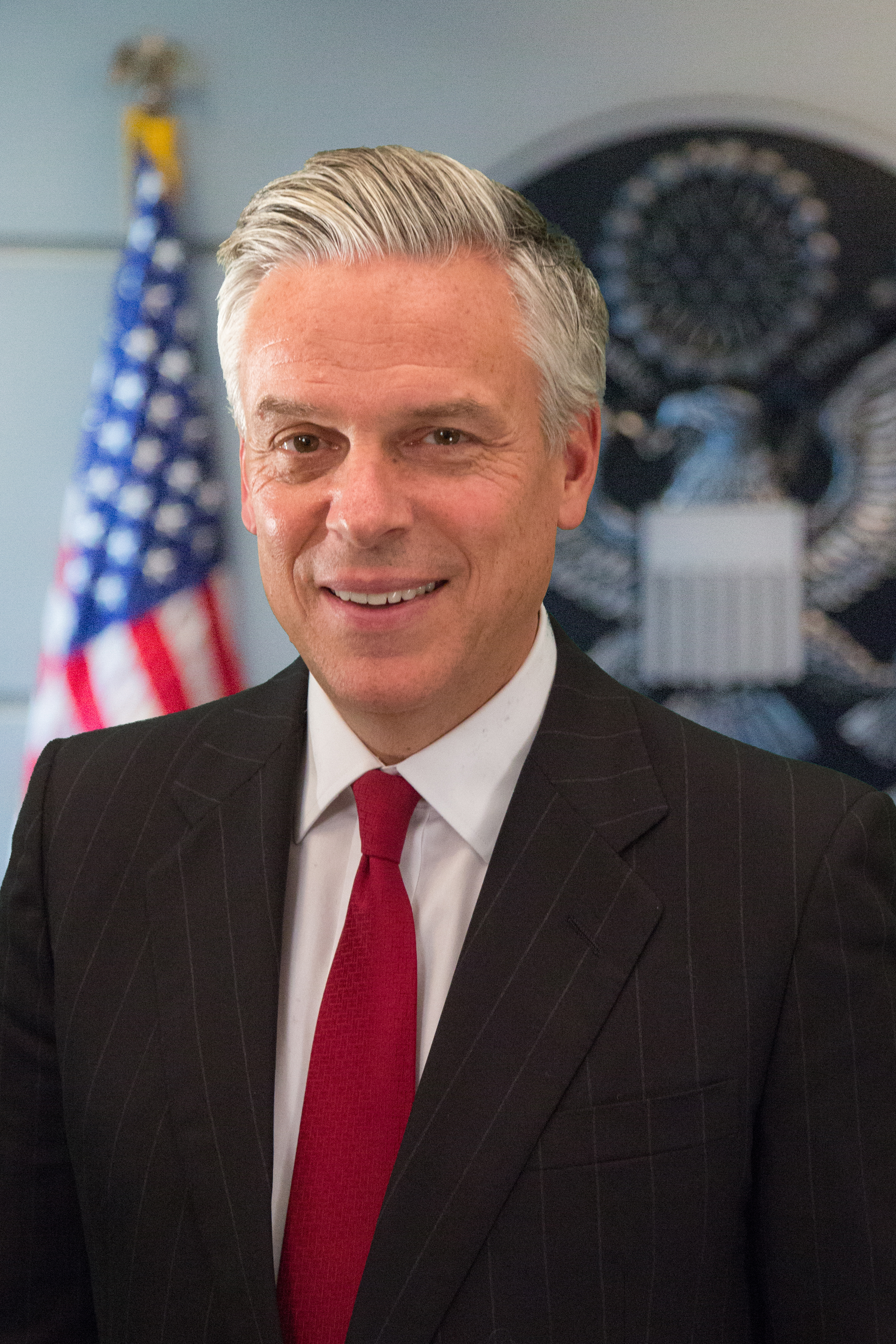
Jon Huntsman Jr.

El Salvador

- Carlos Quintanilla Schmidt, former Vice President of El Salvador

Indonesia

- (Indonesia) Sandiaga Salahuddin Uno, former Deputy Governor of Jakarta

Saudi Arabia

- (Saudi Arabia) Khalid bin Sultan, former Deputy Minister of Defense

Spain

- (Spain) Guillermo Ortega Alonso, former Mayor of Majadahonda and implicated in Gürtel case
- (Spain) Xavier Trias, former Mayor of Barcelona

United States

- (United States) Wesley Clark, former presidential candidate and Supreme Allied Commander Europe
- (United States) Gary Cohn, director of the National Economic Council
- (United States) Jon Huntsman Jr., Ambassador to Russia
- (United States) Randal Quarles, Vice Chairman for Supervision of the Federal Reserve

=== Relatives and associates of government officials ===
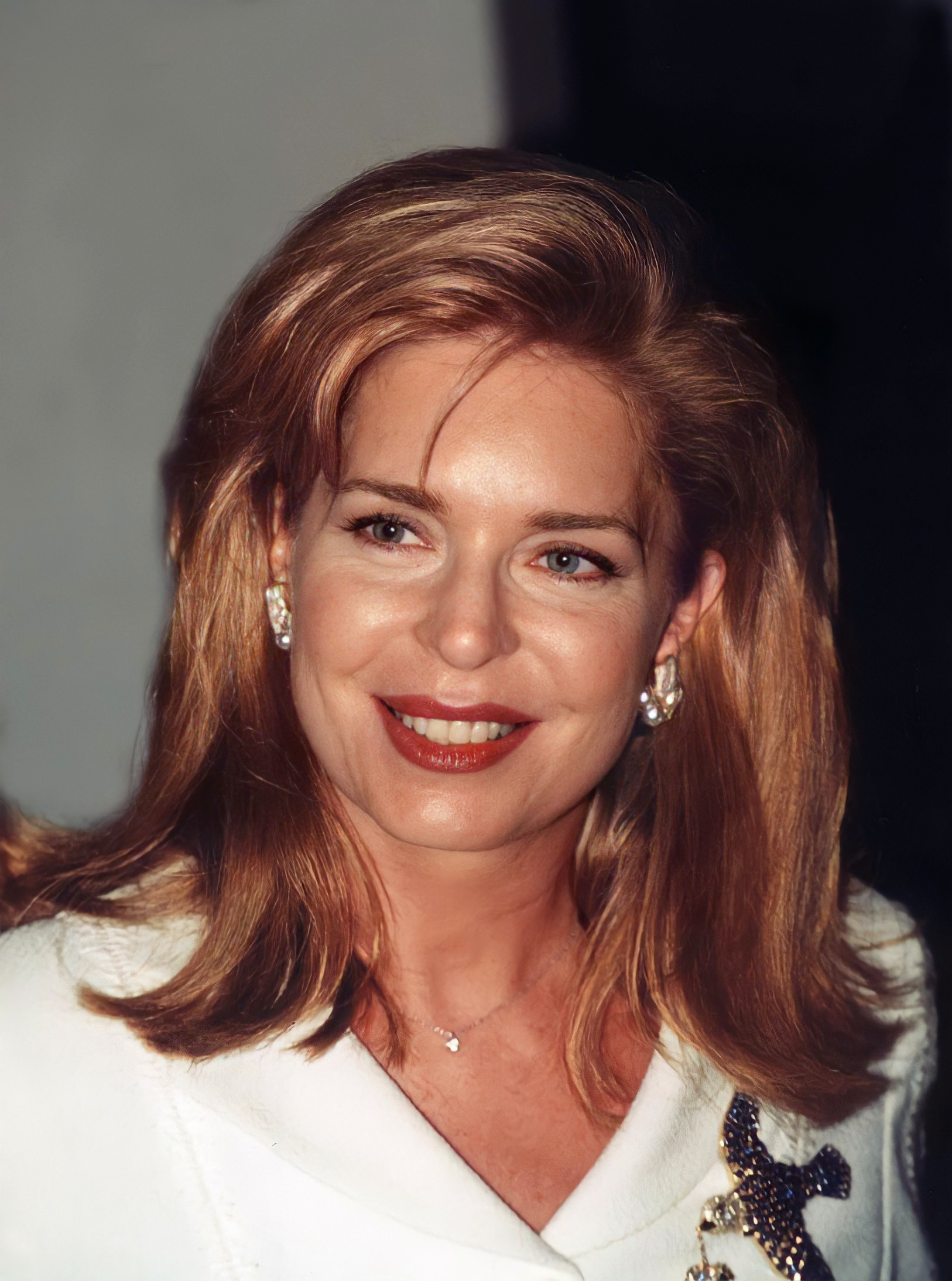
Queen Noor of Jordan

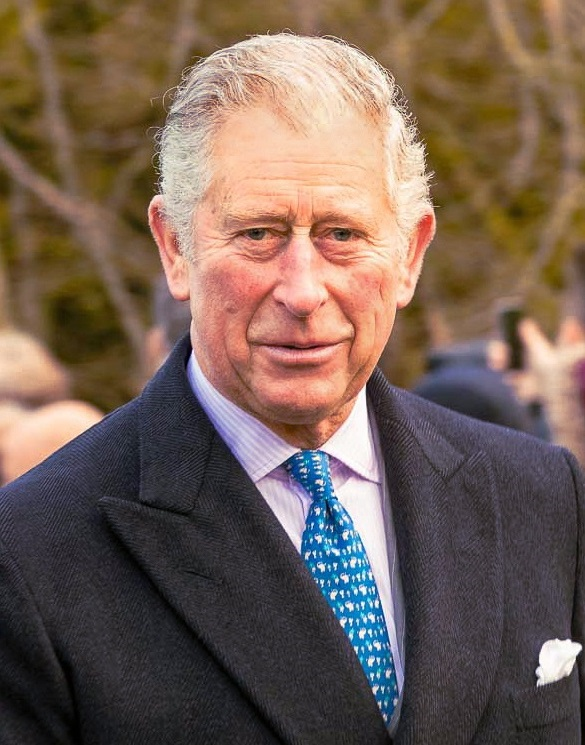
Charles, Prince of Wales

Canada

- (Canada) Stephen Bronfman, close friend of former Prime Minister Justin Trudeau

Ghana

- (Ghana) Ibrahim Mahama, brother of former President John Mahama

Greece

- (Greece) Mareva Grabowski, wife of Prime Minister Kyriakos Mitsotakis

Indonesia

- (Indonesia) Tommy and Mamiek Suharto, children of former President Suharto

Israel

- (Israel) Jonathan Kolber, son of Canadian senator Leo Kolber; former CEO of Koor Industries; beneficiary of the Kolber Trust

Jordan

- Noor Al-Hussein, former Queen consort of Jordan

Montenegro

- (Montenegro) Ana Kolarević, sister of former Prime Minister and President Milo Đukanović

Russia

- (Russia) Olga Shuvalova, wife of First Deputy Prime Minister Igor Shuvalov

Spain

- (Spain) Santiago Alarcó, ex brother-in-law of former Vice President of the Government, Rodrigo Rato
- (Spain) Blanca de la Mata y Pobes, wife of former President of the Congress of Deputies, Jesús Posada
- (Germany) Corinna zu Sayn-Wittgenstein, mistress of former King Juan Carlos I of Spain

Turkey

- (Turkey) Erkam and Bülent Yıldırım, sons of Prime Minister Binali Yıldırım

United Kingdom

- (United Kingdom) Charles, Prince of Wales, then heir apparent to the British throne
- (United Kingdom) Benjamin Leadsom, husband of former Leader of the House of Commons and Lord President of the Council Andrea Leadsom
- (United Kingdom) Peter de Putron, brother-in-law of Andrea Leadsom

== Non-government officials and other people ==
=== Businesspeople ===
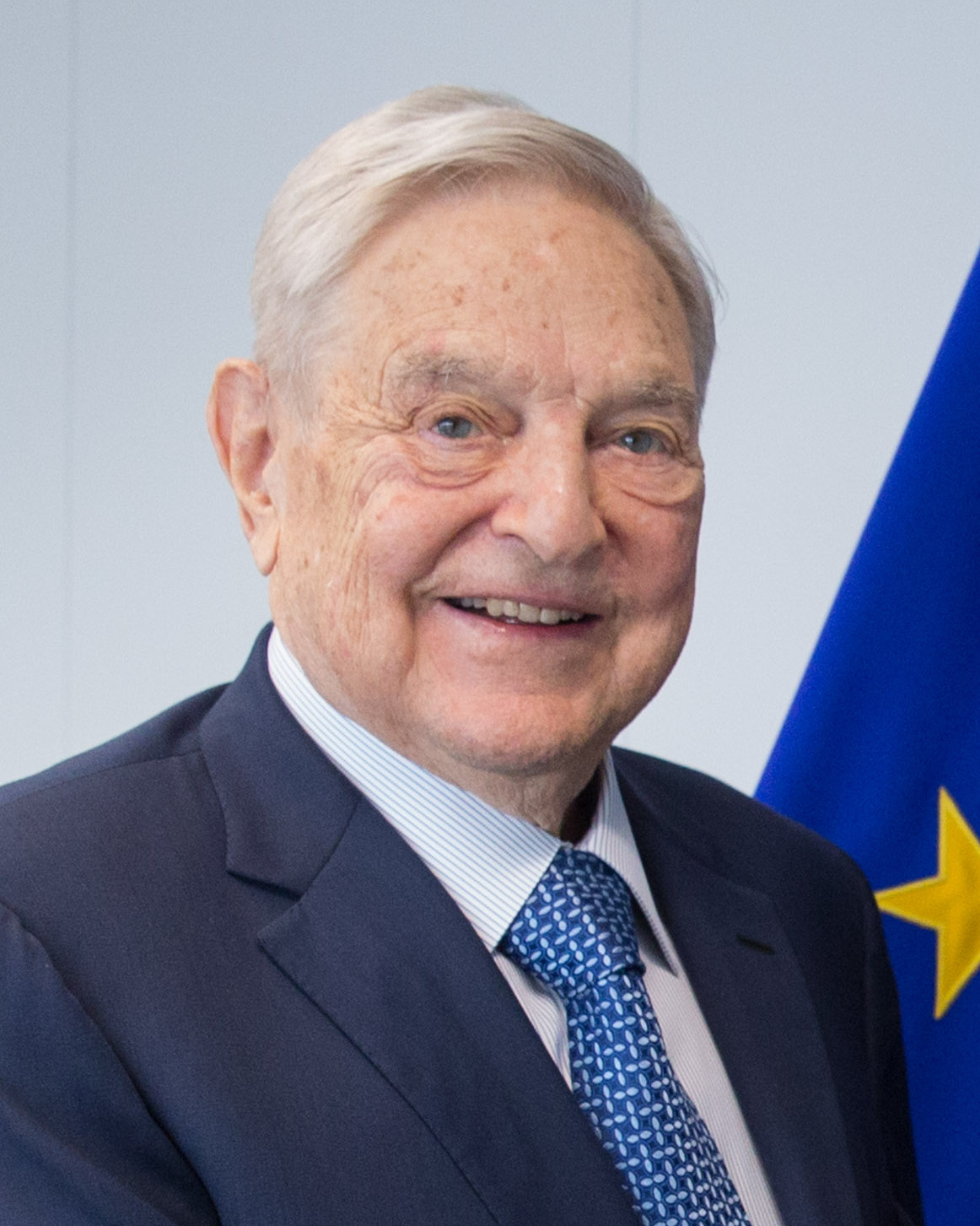
George Soros

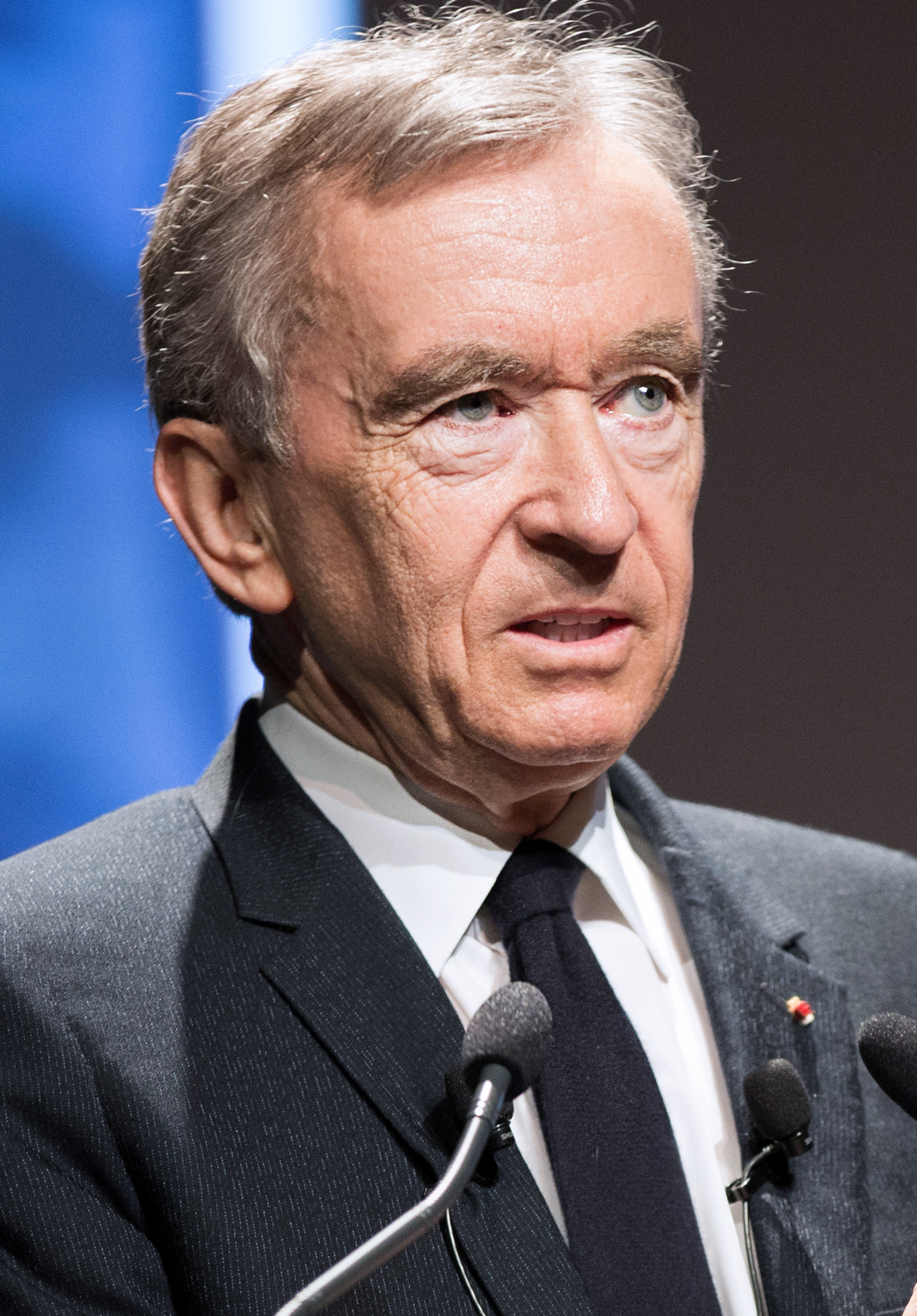
Bernard Arnault

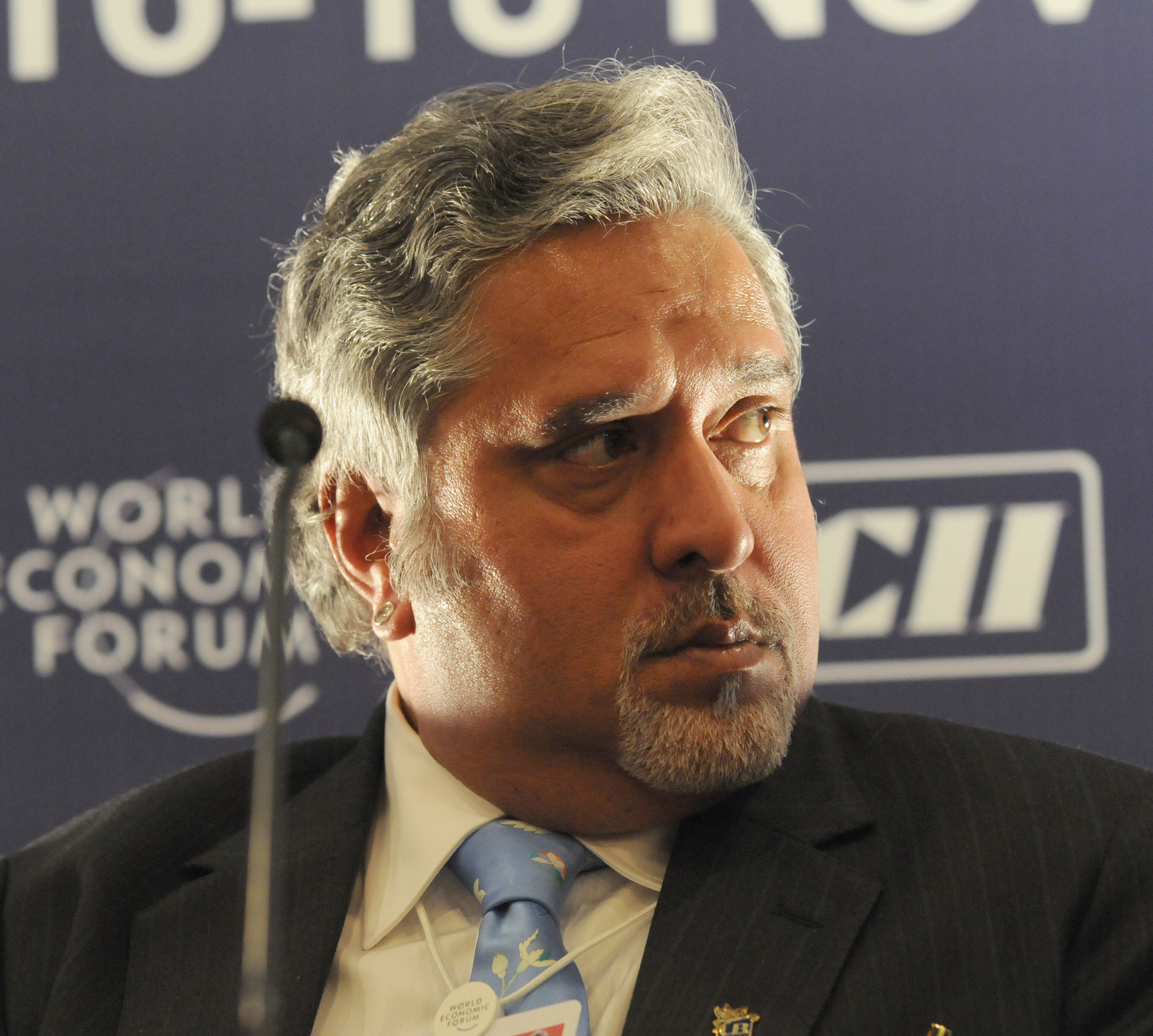
Vijay Mallya

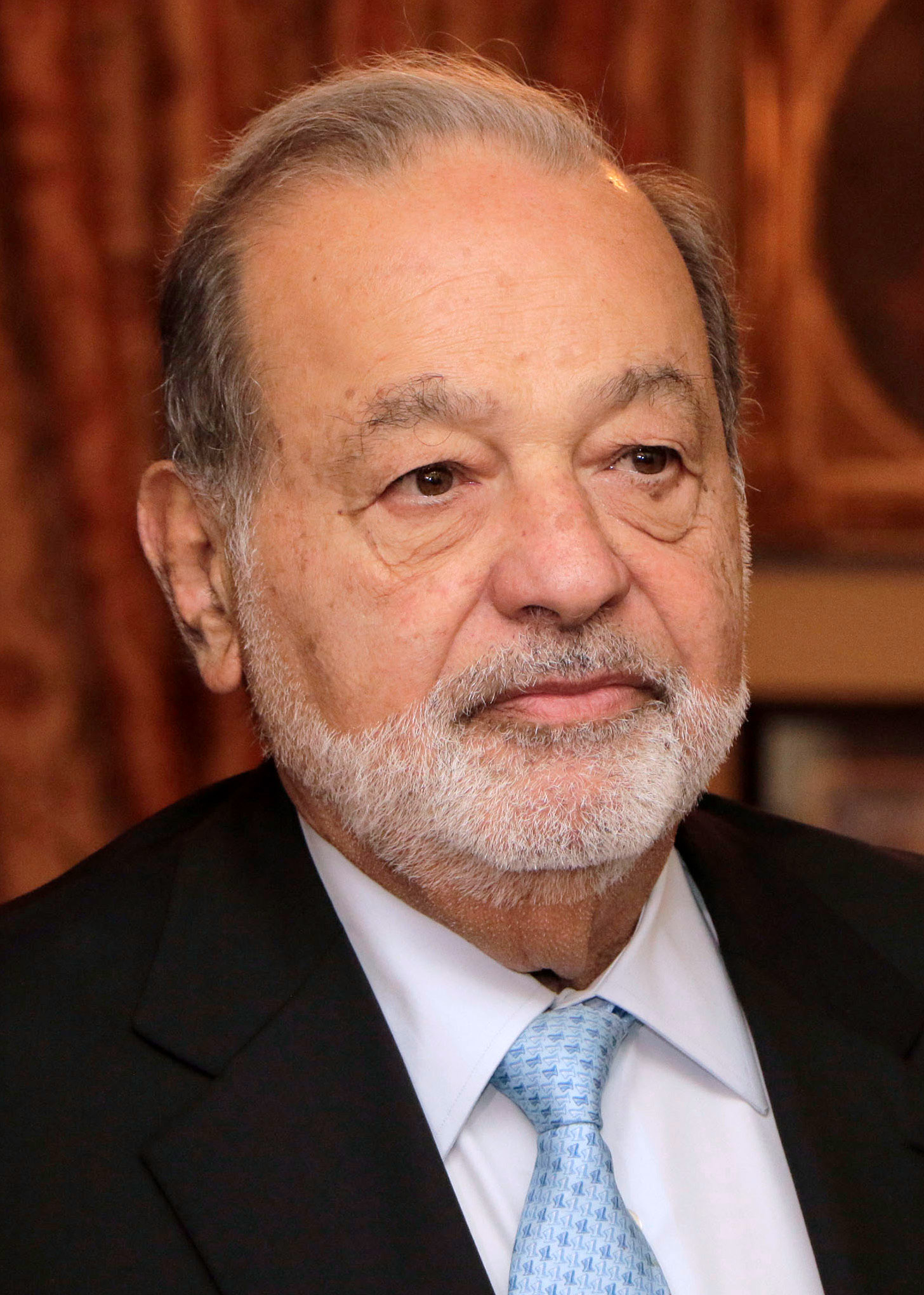
Carlos Slim

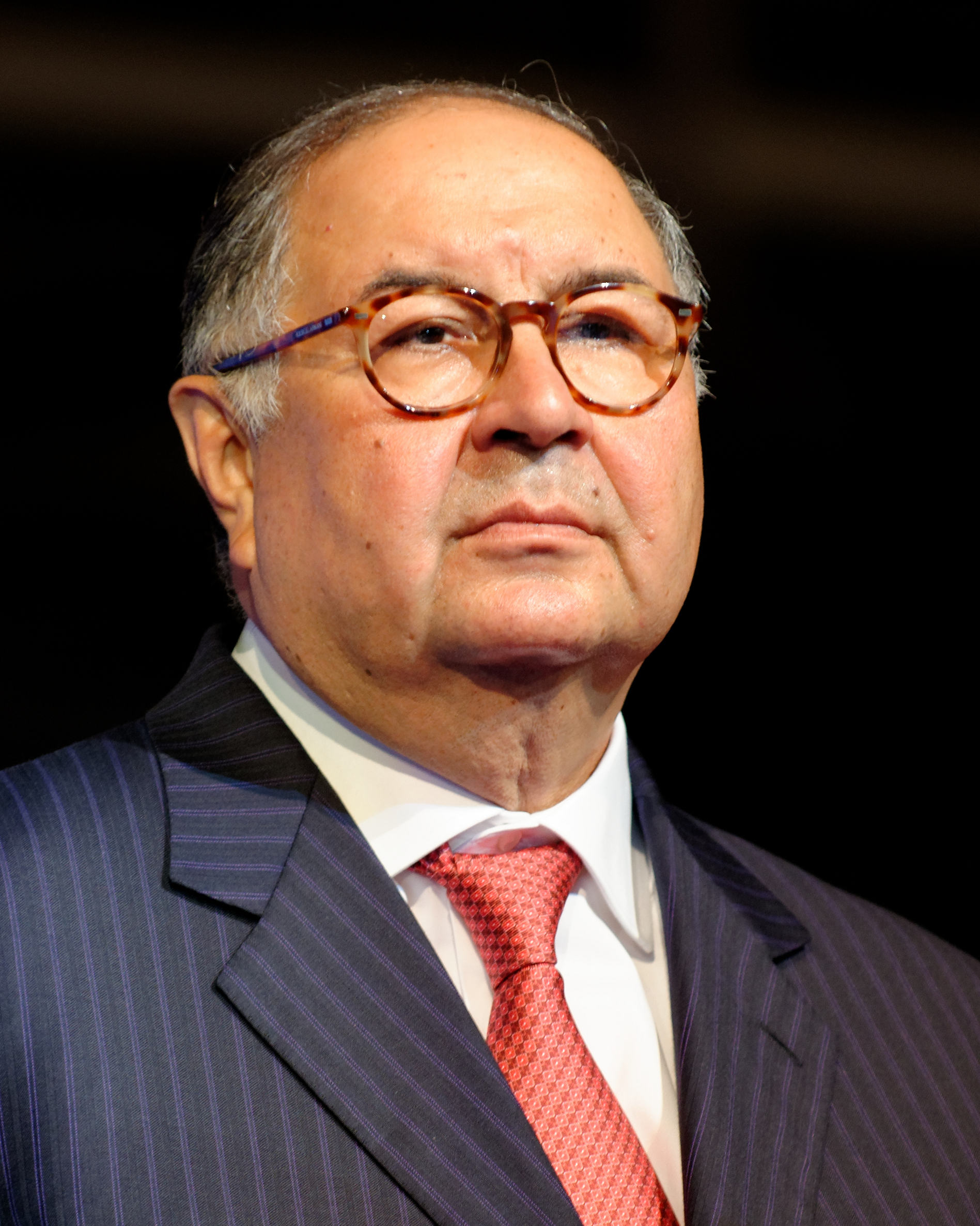
Alisher Usmanov

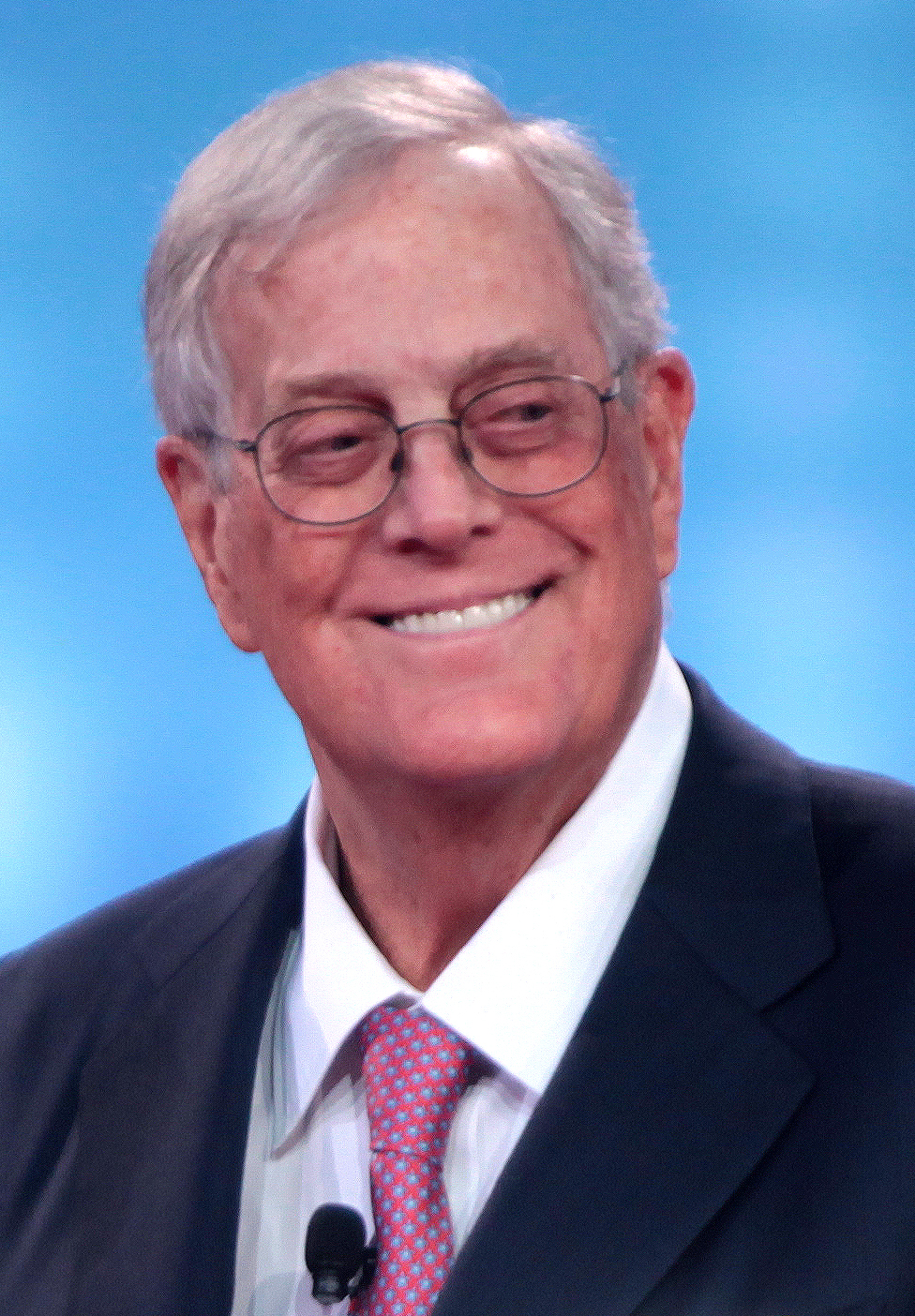
David Koch

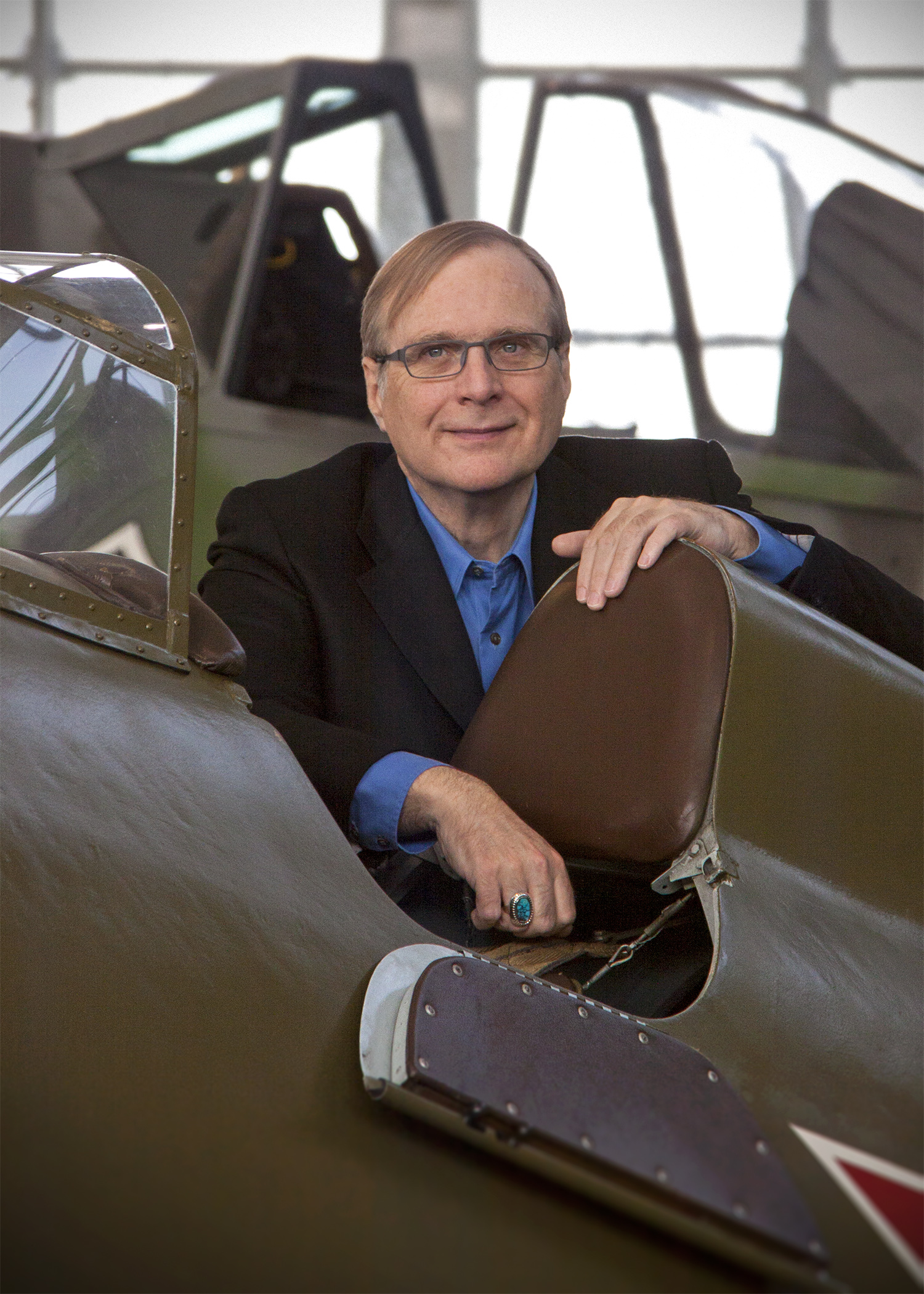
Paul Allen

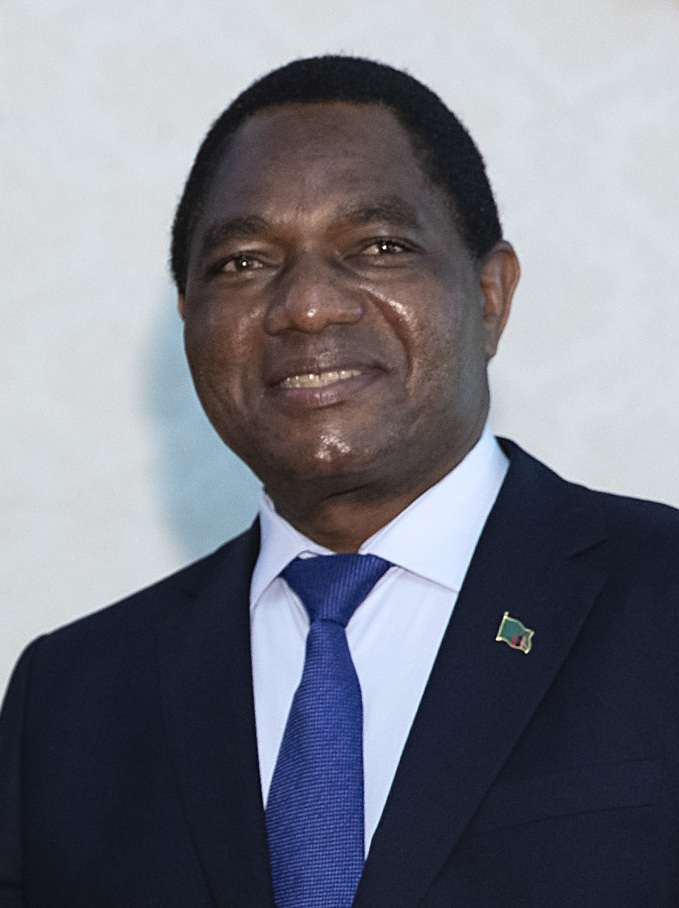
Hakainde Hichilema

Multiple citizenship

- Micky Arison, chairman of Carnival Corporation & plc
- Leonard Blavatnik, founder of Access Industries
- Germán Efromovich, founder of Synergy Group
- Ivan Glasenberg, CEO of Glencore
- Jean-Claude Bastos de Morais, entrepreneur
- Marc Rich, Major shareholder in Glencore
- Lino Saputo, founder of Saputo Inc.
- Mark Scheinberg and his father Isai Scheinberg, founders of PokerStars
- George Soros, founder of Soros Fund Management and Open Society Foundations

Andorra

- Francesc Robert Ribes, former president of Ràdio i Televisió d'Andorra

Argentina

- (Argentina) Alan Faena, hotelier and real estate developer
- (Argentina) Ignacio Jorge Rosner, businessman and financier

Australia

- (Australia) David Coe, founder of Allco Finance Group
- (Australia) Richard Goyder, chairman of AFL Commission and former CEO of Wesfarmers
- (Australia) John Kinghorn, founder of RAMS Home Loans and former shareholder of Allco Finance Group
- (Australia) Nicholas Moore, CEO of Macquarie Group

Canada

- (Canada) Carl Dare, former owner of Dare Foods
- (Canada) Michael DeGroote, businessman and philanthropist
- (Canada) Julien Lavallée, top seller in StubHub
- (Canada) Peter Nygård, accused child sex trafficker, founder of Nygard International
- (Canada) Thierry Vandal, former CEO of Hydro-Québec

Croatia

- (Croatia) Danko Končar, majority shareholder of the Afarak Group

France

- (France) Bernard Arnault, CEO of LVMH
- (France) Philippe Starck, designer

Germany

- (Germany) Curt Engelhorn, former owner of Roche Diagnostics and DePuy
- (Germany) Paul Gauselmann, founder and CEO of Gauselmann

Greece

- (Greece) Giannis Alafouzos, owner of Panathinaikos F.C.
- (Greece) George Economou, shipowner
- (Greece) Telis Mistakidis, major shareholder in Glencore
- (Greece) Nikolas Tsakos, shipowner
- (Greece) Giannis Vardinogiannis, former owner of Panathinaikos F.C.
- (Greece) Vardis Vardinogiannis, chairman and controlling shareholder of Motor Oil Hellas and Vegas Oil and Gas

Iceland

- (Iceland) Björgólfur Thor Björgólfsson, investor and chairman of Novator Partners

India

- (India) Vijay Mallya, chairman of United Breweries Group
- (India) Bandi Parthasaradhi Reddy, founder of Hetero Drugs
- (India) Niira Radia, former corporate lobbyist
- (India) Ashok Seth, chairman of Fortis-Escorts

Israel

- (Israel) Dan Gertler, founder and president of Dan Gertler International Group
- (Israel) Idan Ofer, founder of Tanker Pacific and principal of Quantum Pacific Group

Kazakhstan

- (Kazakhstan) Nurzhan Subkhanberdin, banker and former chairman of Kazkommertsbank
- (Kazakhstan) Nina Zhussupova, member of the board of directors of Kazkommertsbank

Malaysia

- Datuk Kamaruddin Taib, chairman of HSBC Bank Malaysia

Mexico

- (Mexico) Alberto Baillères, chairman of Grupo BAL and ITAM
- (Mexico) Ricardo Salinas Pliego, founder and chairman of Grupo Salinas
- (Mexico) Carlos Slim, owner of Grupo Carso

Pakistan

- (Pakistan) Alauddin Feerasta, chairman of Soneri Bank
- (Pakistan) Sadruddin Hashwani, founder and chairman of Hashoo Group
- (Pakistan) Mian Muhammad Mansha, chairman of Nishat Group

Russia

- (Russia) Roman Abramovich, owner of Millhouse Capital and Chelsea F.C.
- (Russia) Oleg Deripaska, founder and owner of Basic Element
- (Russia) Leonid Mikhelson, CEO of Novatek
- (Russia) Yuri Milner, US-based Russian Silicon Valley investor, and investor in a real estate start-up, Cadre, founded by Donald Trump's son-in-law and senior adviser Jared Kushner
- (Russia) Aleksandr Ponomarenko, businessman and owner of "Putin's Palace"
- (Russia) Arkady and Boris Romanovich Rotenberg, co-owners of SGM
- (Russia) Marina Sechina, investor and ex-wife of Igor Sechin
- (Russia) Oleg Tinkov, oligarch
- (Russia) Alisher Usmanov, oligarch

Saudi Arabia

- (Saudi Arabia) Bakr bin Laden, chairman of the Saudi Binladen Group

Spain

- (Spain) Francisco Correa Sánchez, businessman and head of the Gürtel case
- (Spain) Daniel Maté, billionaire co-owner of Glencore
- (Spain) Juan Bautista Granell Campderà, businessman
- (Spain) Carmen Cervera, Baroness of Thyssen-Bornemisza, socialité and art collector, and his son Borja Thyssen-Bornemisza
- (Spain) Joan Laporta, former president of FC Barcelona
- (Spain) José Manuel Loureda, former president and co-founder of Sacyr
- (Spain) Francisco Ortiz von Bismarck, businessman and economist, descendant of Otto von Bismarck
- (Spain) Luis del Rivero, former president and co-founder of Sacyr
- (Spain) Georges Santamaría, owner of Terra Mítica and Aqualandia
- (Spain) Juan Villalonga, former CEO of Telefónica

Sweden

- (Sweden) Christer Gardell, hedge fund manager
- (Sweden) Bertil Hult, founder of EF Education First
- (Sweden) Leif Östling, former CEO of Scania AB and chairman of Confederation of Swedish Enterprise

Syria

- (Syria) Rami Makhlouf, owner of Syriatel

United Kingdom

- (United Kingdom) Arron Banks, businessman, political donor and co-founder of the Leave.EU campaign
- (United Kingdom) David and Frederick Barclay, businessmen founders of Shop Direct, and David's wife (now widow), Zoe Barclay.
- (United Kingdom) Robert Edmiston, billionaire motor trade entrepreneur and founder of Christian Vision
- (United Kingdom) Hugh Grosvenor, businessman and landowner
- (United Kingdom) Hugh van Cutsem, landowner, banker, businessman, and horse-breeder
- (United Kingdom) Jim Mellon, billionaire businessman
- (United Kingdom) Michael Cyprian Waller-Bridge, founder of Tradepoint and father of actress Phoebe Waller-Bridge

United States

- (United States) Sheldon Adelson, founder of the Las Vegas Sands
- (United States) Paul Allen, co-founder of Microsoft
- (United States) Thomas J. Barrack Jr., founder of Colony NorthStar
- (United States) J. Christopher and Robert Burch, brothers
- (United States) Jeffrey Epstein, late financier and convicted sex offender
- (United States) John Augustine Hearst, business and media executive
- (United States) Carl Icahn, founder of Icahn Enterprises
- (United States) Peter Karmanos, majority owner of the Carolina Hurricanes
- (United States) Charles and David Koch, respectively CEO and EVP of Koch Industries
- (United States) Robert Kraft, founder and CEO of Kraft Group
- (United States) Robert Mercer, co-CEO of Renaissance Technologies
- (United States) Pierre Omidyar, founder of eBay
- (United States) Stephen Pagliuca, co-chairman of Bain Capital
- (United States) Geoffrey Palmer, real estate developer
- (United States) Stephen A. Schwarzman, founder of The Blackstone Group
- (United States) Jim Simons, co-founder of Renaissance Technologies
- (United States) Paul Singer, founder of Elliott Management Corporation
- (United States) Warren Stephens, chairman, president, and CEO of Stephens Inc.
- (United States) Steve Wynn, CEO of Wynn Resorts

Zambia

- (Zambia) Hakainde Hichilema, businessman and politician

=== Entertainment personalities ===
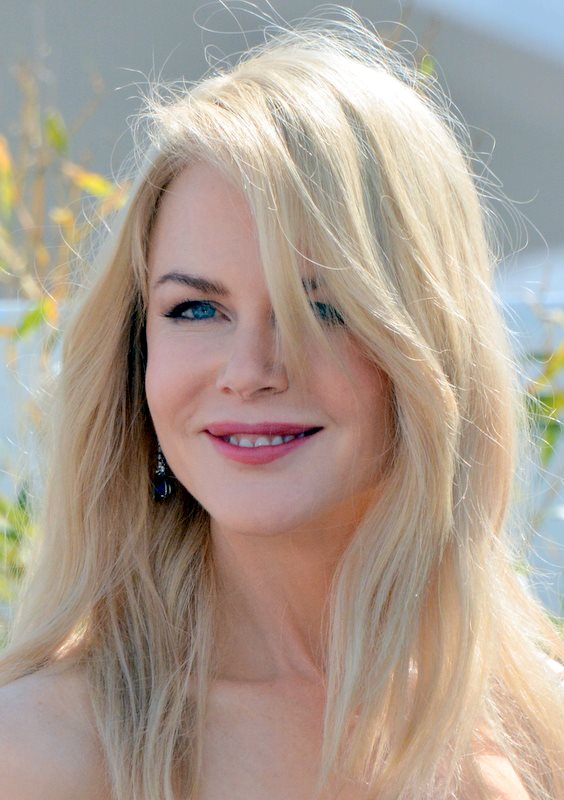
Nicole Kidman

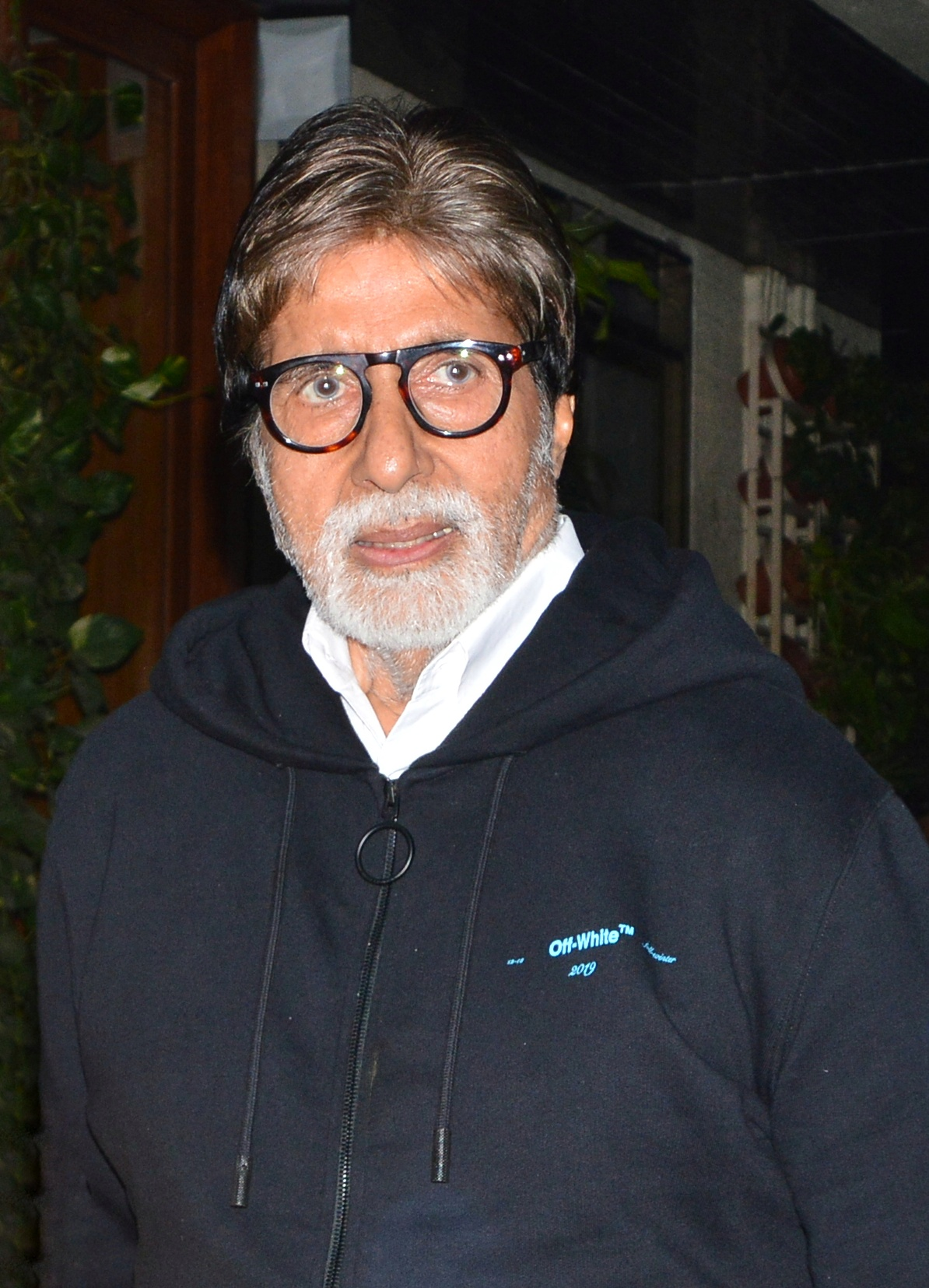
Amitabh Bachchan

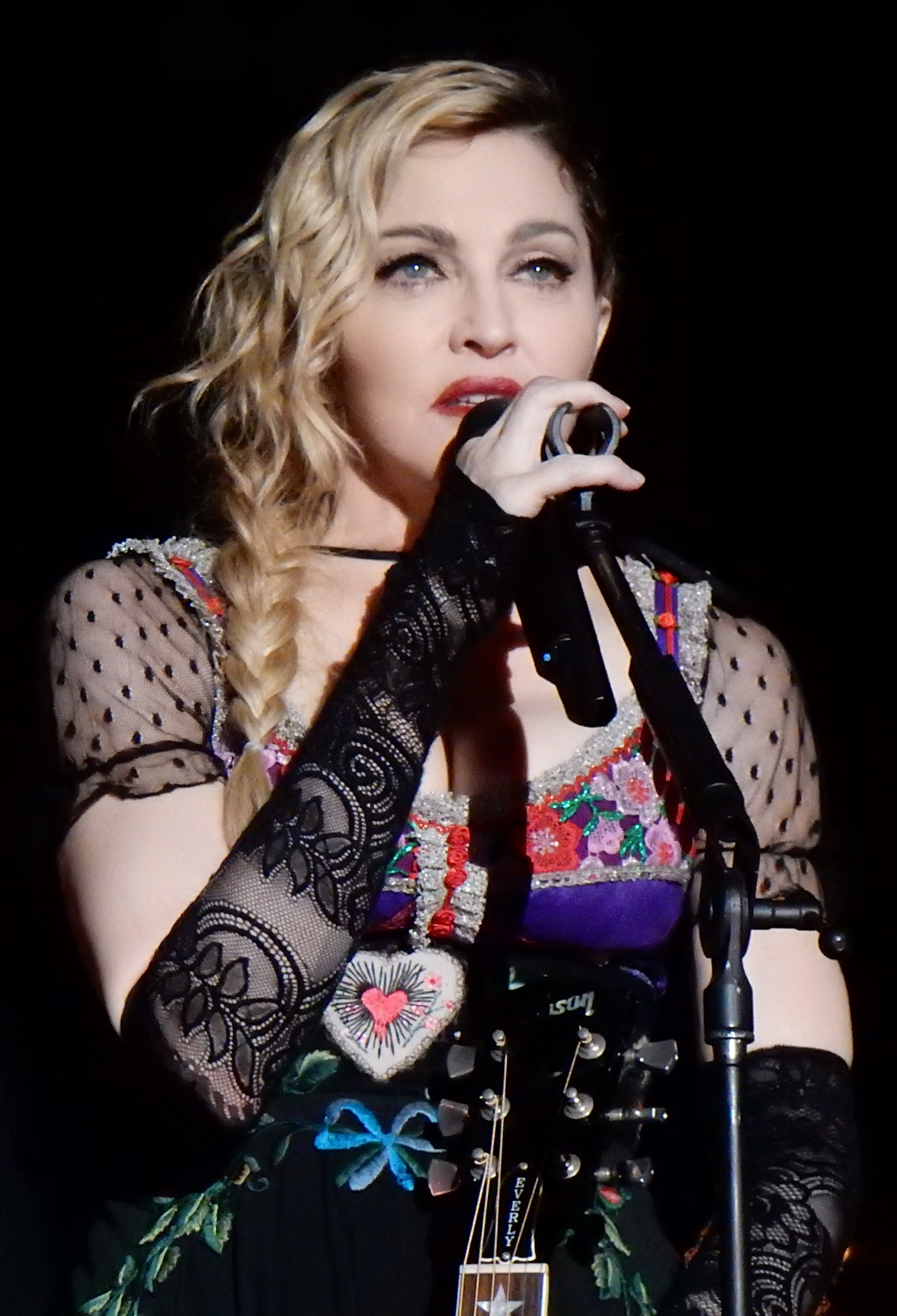
Madonna

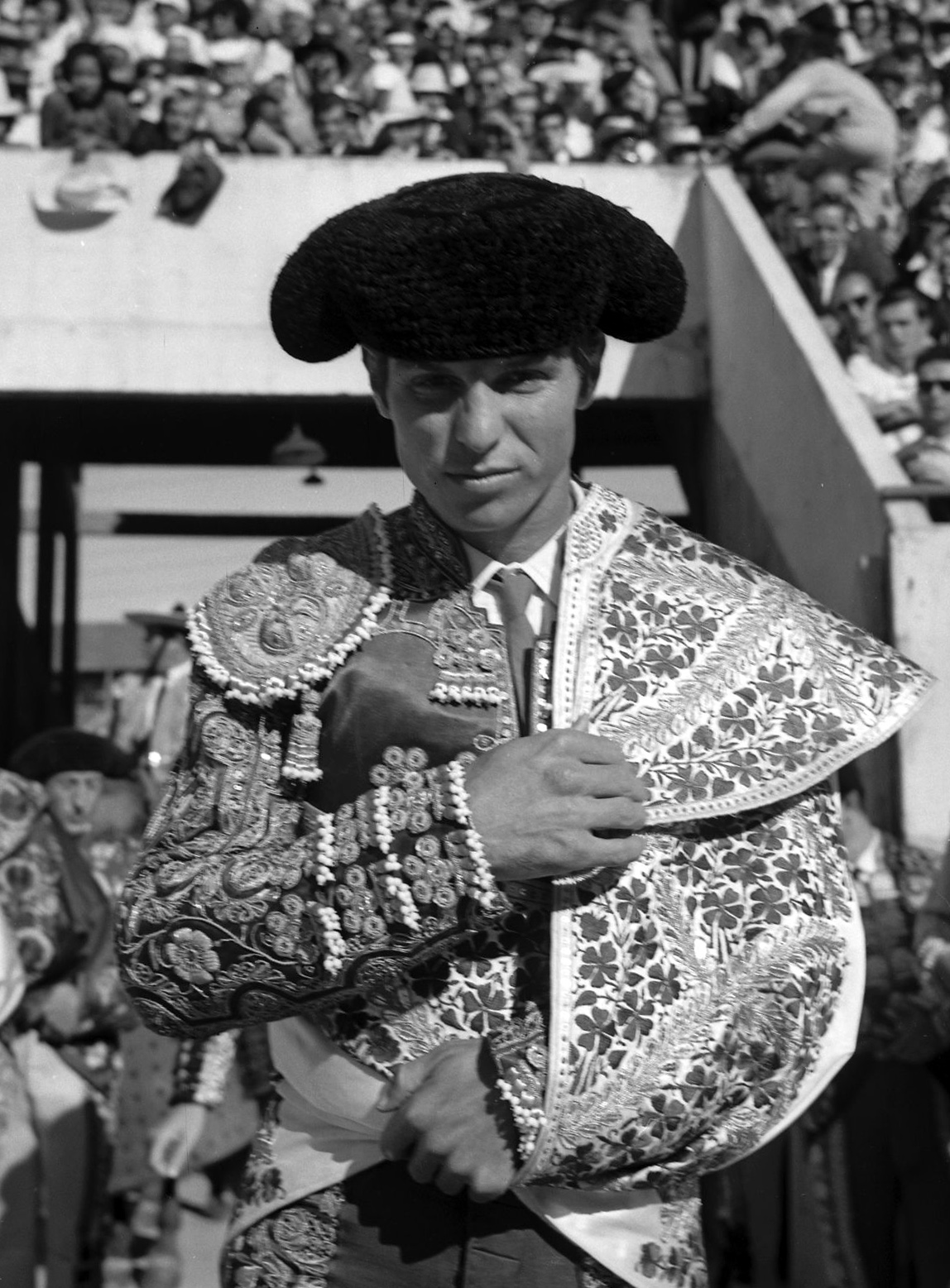
El Cordobés

Australia

- (Australia) Michael Hutchence, singer
- (Australia) Nicole Kidman, actress
- (Australia) Keith Urban, singer

Canada

- (Canada) Avril Lavigne, singer

Colombia

- (Colombia) Shakira, singer

France

- (France) Jean-Jacques Annaud, film director

India

- (India) Amitabh Bachchan, Bollywood actor
- (India) Manyata Dutt, actress

Ireland

- (Republic of Ireland) Bono, singer and philanthropist

Spain

- (Spain) José María Cano, painter and former member of Mecano
- (Spain) El Cordobés, bullfighter
- (Spain) José Frade, film producer
- (Spain) Julio Iglesias and his manager, Alfredo Fraile Lameyer
- (Spain) Inés Sastre, model and film actress

United Kingdom

- (United Kingdom) Fiona Delany, actress in Mrs. Brown's Boys
- (United Kingdom) Martin Delany, actor in Mrs. Brown's Boys
- (United Kingdom) Patrick Houlihan, actor in Mrs. Brown's Boys
- (United Kingdom) Keira Knightley, actress
- (United Kingdom) Gary Lineker, retired footballer and current sports broadcaster

United States

- (United States) Chubby Checker, singer
- (United States) Sheryl Crow, singer
- (United States) John Denver, singer
- (United States) Duke Ellington, composer
- (United States) Kelly Clarkson, singer
- (United States) Madonna, singer
- (United States) Martha Stewart, television personality, business woman, and convicted felon
- (United States) Justin Timberlake, singer
- (United States) Harvey Weinstein, film producer and convicted sex offender

=== Other ===
Mexico

- (Mexico) Marcial Maciel, Catholic priest and founder of the Legion of Christ and Regnum Christi

Philippines

- (Philippines) Eduardo V. Manalo, Executive Minister of the Iglesia ni Cristo

Spain

- (Spain) Fernando Alonso, and his manager, Luis García Abad

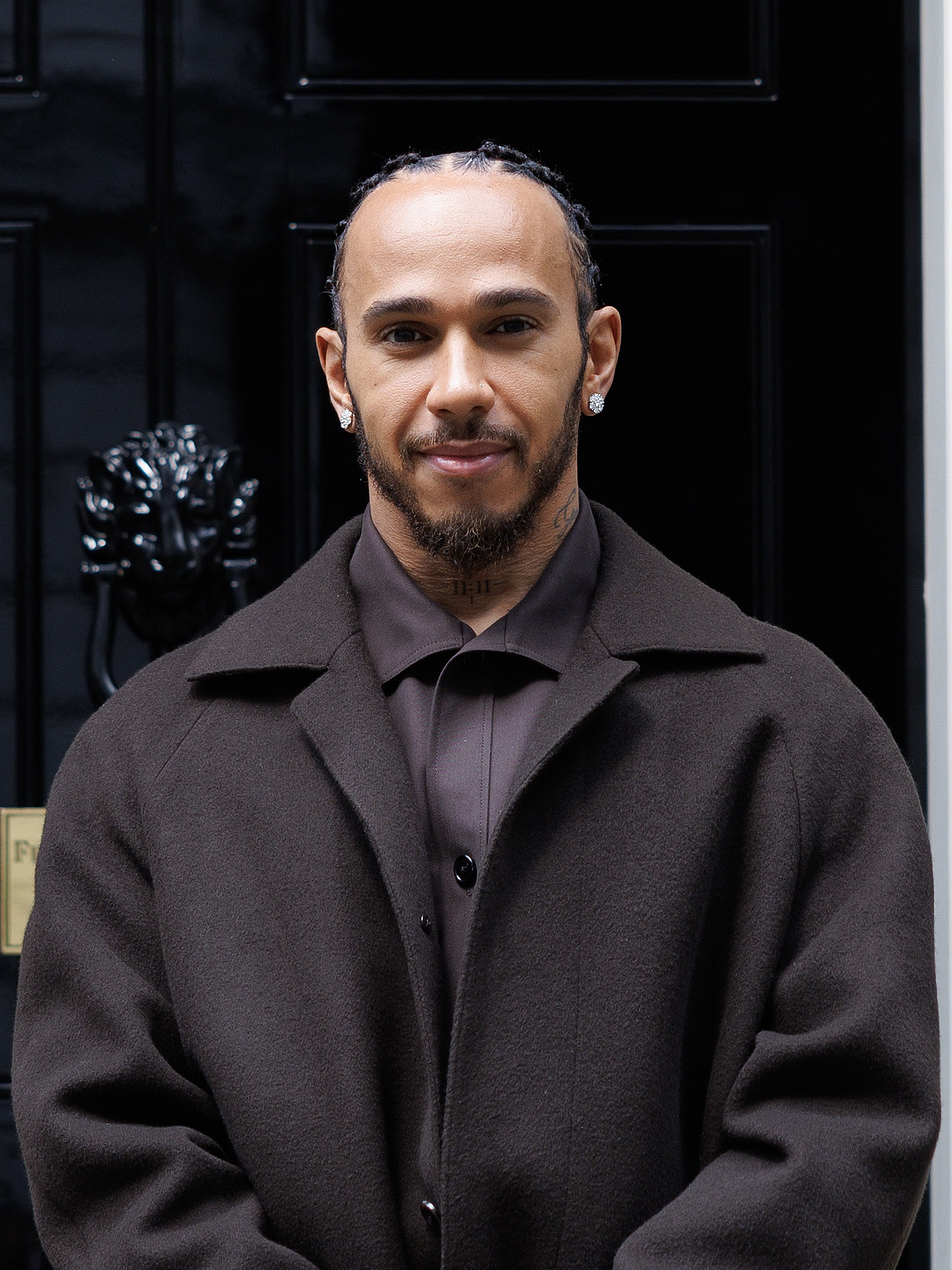
Lewis Hamilton

United Kingdom

- (United Kingdom) Lewis Hamilton, Formula One driver
- Sud Africa CapeTown Colin Plit - Jane Plit

== Organisations ==
=== Companies ===
Argentina

- (Argentina) CAMMESA (Compañía Administradora del Mercado Mayorista Eléctrico)
- (Argentina) Macri Group

Australia

- (Australia) Colonial First State
- (Australia) Commonwealth Bank

Barbados

- (Barbados) Shell Western Supply and Trading Limited, subsidiary of Royal Dutch Shell

Bermuda

- (Bermuda) Appleby
- (Bermuda) Estera

Brazil

- (Brazil) Odebrecht
- (Brazil) Synergy Aerospace, subsidiary of Synergy Group

Canada

- (Canada) Hydro-Québec
- (Canada) Katanga Mining
- (Canada) Loblaw Companies
- (Canada) Maple Leaf Foods
- (Canada) Montreal Canadiens
- Petro-Canada
- (Canada) Suncor Energy

Democratic Republic of the Congo

- (Democratic Republic of the Congo) Gécamines

Finland

- (Finland) Finnfund

France

- (France) Dassault Aviation

Germany

- (Germany) Allianz
- (Germany) Bayer
- (Germany) Deutsche Bank
- (Germany) Deutsche Post
- (Germany) Meininger
- (Germany) Siemens
- (Germany) Sixt
- (Germany) Wirecard

Greece

- (Greece) Intralot

India

- (India) Apollo Tyres
- Emaar India
- (India) Essel Group
- (India) GMR Group
- (India) Havells
- (India) Hindujas
- (India) Hiranandani Group
- (India) Jindal Steel and Power
- (India) Sun Group
- (India) United Spirits
- (India) Videocon

Isle of Man

- (Isle of Man) Conister Bank

Panama

- (Panama) Avianca Holdings

Russia

- (Russia) DST Global, part of Mail.Ru Group
- (Russia) Gazprom
- (Russia) TNK-BP
- (Russia) VTB Bank

Singapore

- (Singapore) Asiaciti Trust

South Africa

- (South Africa) Illovo Sugar
- (South Africa) Investec
- (South Africa) Shanduka Group
- (South Africa) Standard Bank

Switzerland

- (Switzerland) Glencore

Ukraine

- (Ukraine) Roshen

United Kingdom

- (United Kingdom) Barclays
- (United Kingdom) Diageo
- (United Kingdom) Linklaters
- (United Kingdom) Sol Antilles y Guianas Limited, subsidiary of Royal Dutch Shell
- (United Kingdom) Somerset Capital Management

United States

- (United States) Amazon
- (United States) Apple Inc.
- (United States) Baker McKenzie
- (United States) Bank of Utah
- (United States) Disney
- (United States) Facebook
- (United States) Goldman Sachs
- (United States) McDonald's
- (United States) Nike, Inc.
- (United States) The Blackstone Group
- (United States) Twitter
- (United States) Uber
- (United States) Walmart
- (United States) Whirlpool Corporation
- (United States) Wynn Resorts
- (United States) Yahoo!

=== Universities ===
Canada

- (Canada) University of Toronto

United Kingdom

- (United Kingdom) University of Cambridge
  - (United Kingdom) Clare College, Cambridge
  - (United Kingdom) Downing College, Cambridge
  - (United Kingdom) Gonville and Caius College, Cambridge
  - (United Kingdom) Jesus College, Cambridge
  - (United Kingdom) Murray Edwards College, Cambridge
  - (United Kingdom) Newnham College, Cambridge
  - (United Kingdom) Pembroke College, Cambridge
  - (United Kingdom) St Catharine's College, Cambridge
  - (United Kingdom) St John's College, Cambridge
  - (United Kingdom) Trinity College, Cambridge
  - (United Kingdom) Trinity Hall, Cambridge
- (United Kingdom) University of Oxford
  - (United Kingdom) All Souls College, Oxford
  - (United Kingdom) Christ Church, Oxford
  - (United Kingdom) Corpus Christi College, Oxford
  - (United Kingdom) Exeter College, Oxford
  - (United Kingdom) Lincoln College, Oxford
  - (United Kingdom) Magdalen College, Oxford
  - (United Kingdom) Merton College, Oxford
  - (United Kingdom) Nuffield College, Oxford
  - (United Kingdom) Somerville College, Oxford
  - (United Kingdom) St Antony's College, Oxford
  - (United Kingdom) St Catherine's College, Oxford
  - (United Kingdom) The Queen's College, Oxford
  - (United Kingdom) Trinity College, Oxford
  - (United Kingdom) University College, Oxford
  - (United Kingdom) Wolfson College, Oxford
  - (United Kingdom) Worcester College, Oxford

United States

- (United States) Colgate University
- (United States) Columbia University
- (United States) Dartmouth College
- (United States) DePaul University
- (United States) Duke University
- (United States) Indiana University
- (United States) Johns Hopkins University
- (United States) Northeastern University
- (United States) Ohio State University
- (United States) Princeton University
- (United States) Purdue University
- (United States) Reed College
- (United States) Rutgers University
- (United States) Stanford University
- (United States) Syracuse University
- (United States) Texas Christian University
- (United States) Texas Tech University
- (United States) University of Alabama
- (United States) University of Pennsylvania
- (United States) University of Pittsburgh
- (United States) University of Southern California
- (United States) University of Texas System
- (United States) Washington State University
- (United States) Yale University

== See also ==
- List of people named in the Panama Papers
- List of people named in the Pandora Papers
