= Angelicoussis =

Angelicoussis is a surname. Notable people with the surname include:

- Anna Angelicoussis, Greek shipowner
- John Angelicoussis (1948–2021), Greek shipowner
- Maria Angelicoussis (born 1982), Greek shipowner
