= Vardinogiannis Foundation =

Greek foundation

The Vardinogiannis Foundation (Greek: Ίδρυμα Βαρδινογιάννη) is a Greek charity that was created in 1980 and is run by the Vardinogiannis family.

Some of its activities include the financial support of The Smile of the Child, the "Panagia Kalyviani" convent in the Heraklio Prefecture, as well as the creation and running expenses of Elpida (Hope) hospital.

Since 1989, the Vardinogiannis Foundation also grants scholarships for undergraduate and post-graduate studies in Greece to candidates who originate and are studying exclusively in Greek educational institutions.

== See also ==
- Giannis Vardinogiannis
- Marianna Vardinoyannis
- Vardis Vardinogiannis
- Yiorgos Vardinogiannis
