= Galchev =

Galchev (Bulgarian: Галчев) (Russian: Гальчев) is a Bulgarian surname. Notable people with the surname include:

- Boris Galchev (born 1983), Bulgarian footballer
- Filaret Galchev (born 1963), Greek/Russian businessman
- Patrick-Gabriel Galchev (born 2001), Bulgarian footballer
