= Thanasis Martinos =

Greek shipowner (born 1950)

Thanasis Martinos (Greek: Θανάσης Μαρτίνος; born February 1950) is a Greek shipowner and owner of Eastern Mediterranean Maritime Limited (Eastmed).

== Early life and career ==
Thanasis Martinos was born in Athens in February 1950.

Since 1971, he has been working at the newly established family-owned shipping company, Thenamaris Ships Management, founded by his mother. In 1974, he completed his studies in Shipping in London and in Economics at the University of Athens. By 1975, Thenamaris controlled a fleet of 36 vessels, with a total carrying capacity of 850,000 tons. In 1991, Martinos left the company to found Eastern Mediterranean Maritime (EastMed). The company operates 77ocean-going vessels, employs 180 staff members in its offices, and 1,500 seafarers onboard. He is also a major investor in real estate.

He was included in the Forbes List with an estimated fortune of US$1.9 billion.

== Philanthropy and public service ==
He is Archon of the Orthodox Ecumenical Patriarch of Constantinople and from October 2019 until July 2023, he served as the Civil Governor of the Monastic community of Mount Athos.

He has made substantial contributions to healthcare, education, social welfare, the Church, and culture in Greece. He is considered one of the most important benefactors of the Ecumenical Patriarchate of Constantinople. His donations include support to major hospitals such as Sotiria, Papageorgiou, and Attikon, the provision of ICU equipment, funding for schools with interactive boards and tablets, salaries for nursing staff, aid to large families in Thrace, restoration of churches, funding of nursing homes, and sponsorship of cultural initiatives.

== Awards and recognition ==
In 2024 he was awarded the title of Grand Benefactor of the National and Kapodistrian University of Athens and was also named an Honorary Doctor of the School of Medicine and in 2023 he was named an Honorary Doctor by the Department of Maritime Studies at the School of Maritime and Industry of the University of Piraeus.

In 2025 the President of the Hellenic Republic, Katerina Sakellaropoulou, awarded Athanasios Martinos the Grand Cross of the Order of Honour for his philanthropic work.

== Personal life ==
Thanasis Martinos is married to Marina Martinos. The couple has three children including Georgia Martinos, who was a member of the Hellenic Parliament from 2012 until 2023.

His brother is Constantinos Martinos.
