= Marianna Vardinogiannis =

Greek activist (1937–2023)

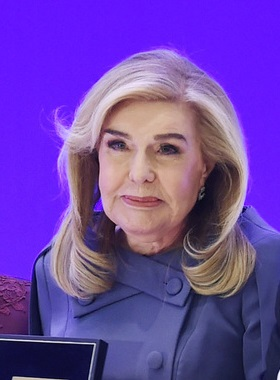
- Vardinogiannis in 2018
- Born: Marianna Bournaki; 2 June 1937; Athens, Kingdom of Greece
- Died: 24 July 2023 (aged 86); Athens, Greece
- Resting place: First Cemetery of Athens
- Education: University of Denver
- Occupations: Unesco; Vardinogiannis Foundation
- Spouse: Vardis Vardinogiannis (m. 1961)
- Children: 5, including Giannis Vardinogiannis

Marianna V. Vardinogiannis (Greek: Μαριάννα Βαρδινογιάννη, née Μπουρνάκη Bournaki; 2 June 1937 – 24 July 2023) was a Greek UNESCO Goodwill Ambassador and an advocate for the rights of children and the family, and against child sexual abuse via her Foundation for the Child and the Family. She was the President of the Elpida (English: Hope) Association of Friends of children with cancer. She was married to a Greek shipping magnate Vardis Vardinogiannis.

== Early life and education ==
Marianna Bournaki was born on 2 June 1937, in Athens, Greece, and raised in Ermione, birthplace of her mother, Evangelia. Her father was George Bournakis, who hailed from the village of Sampatiki, in the province of Kynouria, in Arcadia. She studied Economics at the University of Denver in Colorado after graduating from high school in Athens.

== International and regional activities ==
Vardinogiannis began her activities as a member of various organizations, associations and philanthropic organizations, from which she has fought for international peace and global solidarity, although her primary focus has been mainly on the problems of children: health, education, social welfare and poverty, child abuse and exploitation. At the same time, she supported vulnerable social groups, refugees and schools throughout the Greek territory as well as areas and people that had been affected by natural disasters such as the village of Makistos which was revived after being destroyed by fires.

She developed strong relationships with several international personalities, such as Queen Rania of Jordan, Suzanne Mubarak, several networks, collaborations and organizations such as the Global Coalition Women Defending Peace.

On 14 October 2010, the Elpida (Hope) Children's Oncology located in Athens, Greece, which focuses on child cancer, was inaugurated and opened to the public.

== Personal life and death ==
Marianna Bournaki married Greek shipping magnate Vardis Vardinogiannis in 1961. They had five children. She died on 24 July 2023, at the age of 86, in Athens.

== Awards and honors ==
She received many honorary titles and awards including the Academy of Athens Prize, the Archon of the Patriarchate of Alexandria, Grand Prize of the Charter of Paris against cancer, and the "Ripple of Hope" prize awarded by the Robert F. Kennedy Human Rights Foundation, among others.

The most notable included:

- Légion d'Honneur. Title conferred in 2006 by the French Republic. Title of Officier conferred in 2015.
- Golden Cross of the Order of Beneficence by the Hellenic Republic.
- The 2020 Nelson Mandela Prize by the United Nations General Assembly.

== See also ==
- Vardinogiannis Foundation
