= John Angelicoussis =

Greek businessman (1948–2021)

John Angelicoussis Γιάννης Αγγελικούσης
- Born: John Anthony Angelicoussis; 16 November 1948; Piraeus, Greece
- Died: 10 April 2021 (aged 72); Athens, Greece
- Occupation: Owner of Angelicoussis Shipping Group
- Spouse: Elizabeth Gordon
- Children: Maria Angelicoussis

John Anthony Angelicoussis (Greek: Ιωάννης Αγγελικούσης; 16 November 1948 – 10 April 2021) was a Greek shipowner.

== Background and early life ==
Angelicoussis was born in Piraeus in 1948. His parents, Maria Papalios and Anthony Angelicoussis (1918–1989) came from the village of Kardamyla on the island of Chios, where the family had been involved in maritime activities, initially piracy and later fishing and cargo shipping, since the 18th century. Anthony Angelicoussis served as a ship's radio operator during World War II, before buying his first ship in 1950.

After leaving school, Angelicoussis attended the Athens University of Economics and Business and then studied for a Master of Business Administration (MBA) at the Massachusetts Institute of Technology.

== Career ==
Angelicoussis joined his father's shipping company in 1973. In 1987, Anangel-American Shipholdings was floated on the Luxembourg stock market. Two years later the company listed on Nasdaq On the death of his father in 1989, Angelicoussis became president and chief executive officer (CEO) of the Angelicoussis Shipping Group. In 2002, he reached an agreement with his sister, Anna Angelicoussis, to break the 50/50 control deal and take over the group. In 2013, he was ranked first among Greek shipowners by Lloyd's List. At that time, the company had a fleet of 93 ships, including 41 tankers, with 80 of the ships sailing under a Greek flag. The company's first two LNG carriers were on order. In 2015, Angelicoussis had a net worth of $2.4 billion, and a fleet of 96 ships, according to Bloomberg.

In 2019, Angelicoussis was maintaining his position as the largest shipowner in Greece in terms of tonnage. The company was the number one shipper of LNG to the US that year.

Angelicoussis died in Athens on 10 April 2021 after suffering a heart attack. Greek prime minister Kyriakos Mitsotakis paid tribute to him: "John Angelicoussis honoured the maritime tradition and our homeland in every way". He commended Angelicoussis for sailing his fleet under a Greek flag, moving the company's headquarters to Greece, and supporting Greek health services and maritime education.

== Personal life ==
Angelicoussis was married to Elizabeth Gordon, a classical archaeologist and author. The couple had one child, Maria Angelicoussis, who studied medicine at the University of Cambridge and worked as an NHS doctor in England for two years before joining the Angelicoussis Group in 2008. She became CEO of the group after her father's death. She married Lawrence Frankopan and has three children.
