= Eurocement group =

Largest cement company in Russia

EUROCEMENT Group
- Company type: Joint Stock Company
- Industry: Building materials
- Founded: 2002
- Headquarters: Moscow, Russia
- Key people: Filaret Galchev (Chairman)
- Products: Cement, construction aggregate, concrete, construction materials
- Revenue: ▲₽ 55.7 billion (2011)
- Net income: ▲₽ 10.2 billion (2011)
- Number of employees: 20,000 (2014)
- Parent: Eurocement AG
- Website: www.eurocement.ru

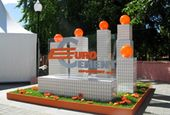
Eurocement

The EUROCEMENT group is the biggest supplier of cement, ready-mix concrete and aggregates in Russia. It has 16 cement plants across Russia, Ukraine and Uzbekistan as well as several concrete mix plants, concrete goods factories and aggregate-mining quarries.
The Group's annual production capacity is 40 MT of cement and 10 Mcm of concrete. Aggregate resources: carbonate rock explored reserves amount to 2.8 billion tonnes; granite-explored reserves amount to 1.8 billion tonnes.

== History ==
EUROCEMENT group was formed in 2002 following the merger of Rosuglesbit and Shtern-cement. The company originally had four plants: Maltsovsky Portlandcement, Mikhailovcement, Lipetskcement, and Savinsky cement. But since 2005, following the purchase of seven additional cement plants, EUROCEMENT group has become a leading company in the Russian cement market.

In May 2014 the company signed a package of contracts with Chinese companies for equipment supplies, engineering, installation supervision and employee training totaling $530.7 million. Contracted supplies include mechanical equipment, furnaces, cyclone heat exchangers, crushers, and mills. The new equipment will be used for the construction of new cement plants with a total capacity of 17 million tons of cement per year in six regions of Russia: Leningrad, Ryazan, Bryansk, Arkhangelsk, Ulyanovsk and Samara regions, according to the corporate message.

In July 2021, Sberbank, the main creditor of the Eurocement group, sold its shares and debt load to the Mikhailov Construction Materials Plant for 161 billion rubles, according to the evaluation of proposals on Russian Auction House electronic platform.

== Management ==
The board of directors elected at the annual general shareholders meeting consists of:

- Filaret Galchev (chairman of board of directors)
- Lachuev Kamil Gadjievich (Member of board of directors, vice-president for corporate and legal matters)
- Grigoriadis Kusma Anastasovich (Member of board of directors, vice-president for security and legal matters)
- Skorokhod Mikhail Anatolievich (Member of board of directors, president)
- Kondratenko Tatiana Vasilievna (Member of board of directors, senior vice-president)

== EUROCEMENT group Plants ==
RUSSIA

Cement

- Belgorodsky Cement (Belgorod Region)
- Zhigulevskie Building Materials (Samara Region)
- Kavkazcement (Karachaevo-Cherkessian Republic)
- Katavsky Cement (Chelyabinsk Region)
- Lipetskcement (Lipetsk Region)
- Maltsovsky Portlandcement (Bryansk Region)
- Mikhailovcement (Ryazan Region)
- Nevyansky Cementnic (Sverdlovsk Region)
- Oskolcement (Belgorod Region)
- Pikalevsky Cement (Leningrad Region)
- Podgorensky Cementnic (Voronezh Region)
- Savinsky Cement Plant (Arkhangelsk Region)
- Ulyanovskcement (Ulyanovsk Region)

EUROBETON is also a part of the EUROCEMENT Group.

Concrete

- Batching Plant in Oskol
- Batching Plant in Belgorod
- Batching Plant in Lipetsk
- Batching Plant in Yekaterinburg
- Batching Plant in Podgorensky
- Batching Plant in Krasnodar
- Batching Plant in Yaroslavl
- Batching Plant in Chelyabinsk
- LLC Eurobeton
- JSC Spetsstroybeton ZHBI 17

Cement Elevators

- LLC Cement Service (Moscow)
- JSC Asphalt Concrete – Medvedkovo (Moscow)
- MCE Marjina Roscha (Moscow)
- Construction Materials Production
- JSC Peskovsky Construction Materials Works

Aggregate

- LLC Lobskoe-5 (Karelia Region)
- LLC Prom-Activ (Orenburg Region)

Industrial Construction

- CJSC Eurocement Engineering (Moscow)

Transport Company

- LLC ServiceTransStroy (Moscow)
- LLC Centre Trans (Moscow)

Procurement

- CJSC Eurocement Resource (Moscow)

UKRAINE

Cement

JSC EUROCEMENT group – UKRAINE

- JSC EUROCEMENT – UKRAINE (Kharkov region)
- JSC Kramatorsky Cement Plant Pushka (Donetsk region)

UZBEKISTAN

Cement

- JSC EUROCEMENT group – Central Asia (Tashkent region)
- JSC Akhangarancement (Tashkent region)

Concrete

- Construction materials and structures works, integrated in JSC Akhangarancement (Tashkent)
