= Rostov Hotel =

Hotel in Rostov-on-Don, Russia

Coordinates: 47.2267°N 39.7028°E

- Гостиница «Ростов»
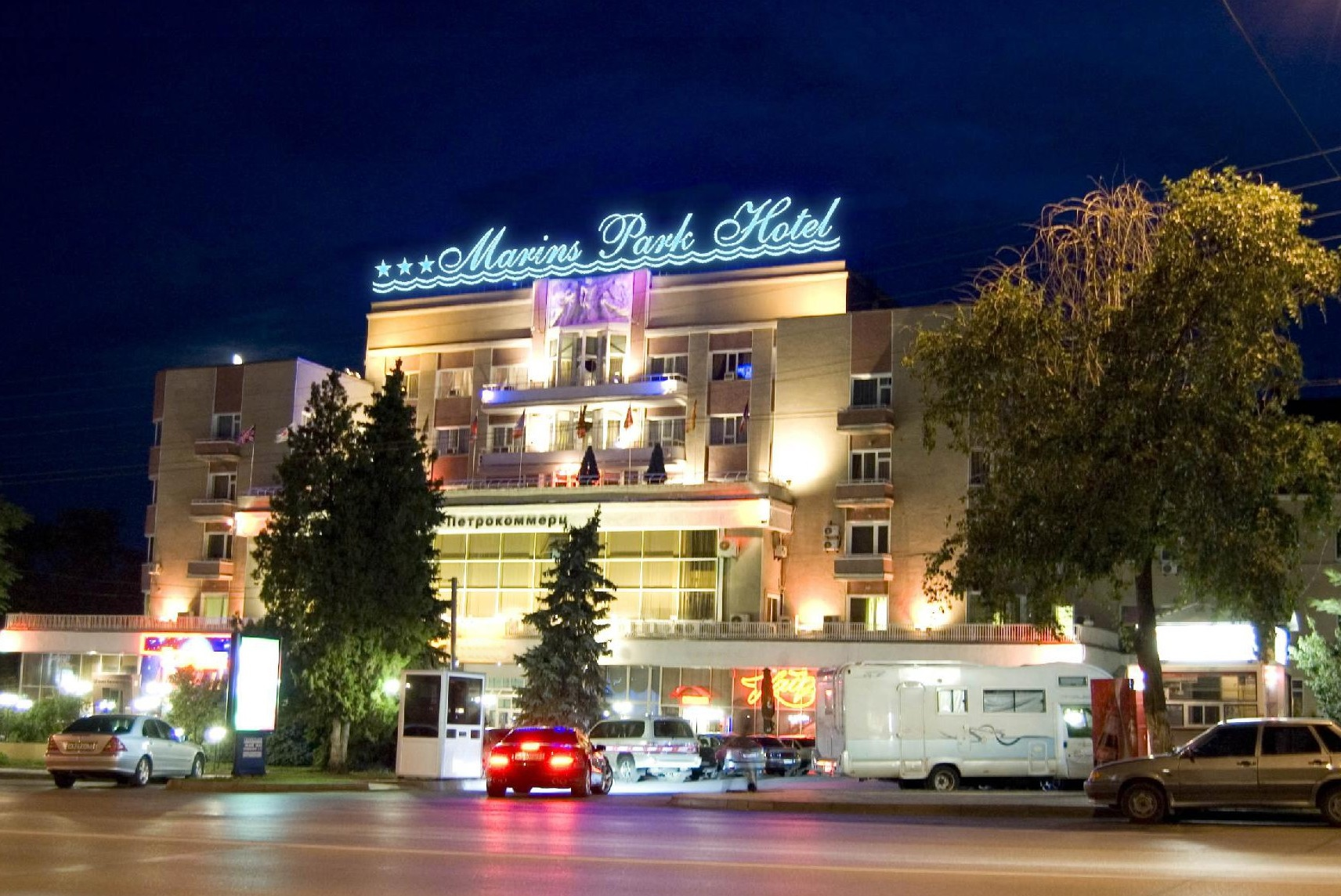
- Interactive map of the Rostov Hotel area

General information
- Architectural style: Soviet constructivism
- Location: Rostov-on-Don, Russia
- Year built: 1934

Design and construction
- Architects: Ilya Cherkessian, Khachatur Chalkhushyan, Leonid Eberg

Rostov Hotel (Russian: Гостиница «Ростов») is a hotel in Rostov-on-Don. It was built in 1934 in the style of Soviet constructivism by the architects Ilya Cherkessian, Khachatur Chalkhushyan and Leonid Eberg. It is the oldest operating hotel in Rostov-on-Don. The building is currently occupied by Marins Park Hotel Rostov.

== Architecture ==
Rostov Hotel has typical features of constructivist architecture. There are geometric shapes with an ascetic dryness of the facades. It has a functional layout with gray, unpainted facades made of reinforced concrete; large areas of glazing; and ribbon character of windows (vertical or horizontal). Flat roofs are hidden behind parapets.

== History ==
During the German occupation in World War II, the building was a German soldiers' club. The hotel suffered during battles in the city. After the war, the former apartments became the rooms of communal apartments. Because of the dense population of the building, the authorities of Rostov-on-Don could not issue a decree to restore it for a while. The reconstruction was completed only in 1965 under the guidance of architect Leonid Eberg. The Rostov Hotel was the last renovated building after the war in Rostov-on-Don. Its initial appearance was partially lost: the columns piercing the two floors upwards were dismantled, and the dark color of the window frames was replaced by white.
