= Optima bank =

Greek bank

Optima bank S.A.
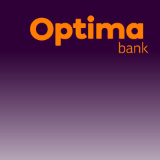
- Type: Anonymi Etairia
- Industry: Financial services
- Predecessor: Investment Bank of Greece
- Founded: 24 January 2000; 26 years ago
- Headquarters: Maroussi, Greece
- Number of locations: 29 branches (2025)
- Area served: Greece
- Key people: George Taniskidis (Chairman); Dimitris Kyparissis (CEO)
- Products: Banking; Financial services
- Net income: €140.2 mn (2024)
- Total assets: €7.790bn (Q1 2026)
- Total equity: €620.3 mn (2024)
- Owner: Ireon Investments Ltd (8.9%)
- Number of employees: 575 (2024)
- Subsidiaries: Optima factors, Optima asset management AEDAK, Optima leasing
- Capital ratio: Common Equity Tier 1 =14.4% (Fully Loaded Basel III)
- Website: www.optimabank.gr

Optima bank is a banking and financial services institution in Greece which is listed on Euronext Athens. It offers its customers both, retail and businesses products and services according to their needs.

Optima bank HQ's are located in Maroussi of Athens (Aigialeias 32 and Paradissou street).

== History ==
Optima bank was founded on 31 July 2019 through the transfer of Investment Bank of Greece shares to Ireon Investments, a member of Motor Oil Group (Hellas). To strengthen its capital base and support its development strategy, Optima bank implemented a share capital increase in 2021 along with utilizing other financial instruments such as the issuance of a convertible bond loan in 2022.

== See also ==
- List of banks in the euro area
- List of banks in Greece

== Bibliography ==
- IBOGGRAAXXX, published by TransferWise, "Optima bank..."
