= Constantinos Martinos =

Greek businessman (born 1953)

- Born: January 28, 1953 (age 73); Glyfada, Athens, Greece
- Other names: Dinos
- Occupations: Shipowner, businessman
- Known for: Billionaire shipowner
- Children: 3
- Mother: Athina Martinos (née Methenitis)
- Relatives: Thanasis Martinos (brother)
- Family: Martinos family

Constantinos "Dinos" Martinos (born 1953) is a Greek billionaire shipowner and businessman.

== Early life and career ==
He was born on January 28, 1953, and hails from Glyfada, Athens. He comes from the historic Martinos family, with his mother, Athina Martinos (née Methenitis), being one of the first female shipowners in Greece, who founded the shipping company Thenamaris in 1971. His brother is Thanasis Martinos.

From an early age, he was actively involved in shipping, helping manage the family fleet from the mid-1960s. In 1972, he co-founded Thenamaris Ships Management with his mother and siblings. Over time, the siblings withdrew from the business, leaving him as the principal manager. Today, Thenamaris is one of the world’s leading shipping companies, operating a modern fleet of over 95 vessels, including tankers, bulk carriers, LNG carriers, and container ships.

== Recognition ==
In 2011, Lloyd's List named him number 67 in their list of the Top 100 most influential people in the shipping industry.

Constantinos Martinos’ net worth is estimated at $2.24 billion listed at 1690 globally.

== Personal life ==
He has three children: his son, Nikolas Martinos, now runs Thenamaris, while another son, Ioannis Martinos, has founded and leads his own shipping company, the Signal Group.

He is a serious art collector and his collection includes works by Picasso, Twombly, Basquiat, Warhol etc.

He is also known for its contributions to philanthropy and social initiatives including the funding and foundation of a new building with 115 hospital beds at the Asklipieio Hospital of Voula, a project valued at 10 million euros.
