= Telis Mistakidis =

Greek-British businessman and former metals trader (born 1961)

Aristotelis Mistakidis Αριστοτέλης Μυστακίδης
- Born: 21 November 1961 (age 64); Rome, Italy
- Citizenship: Greek; British
- Education: London School of Economics (BSc Economics)
- Occupations: Businessman, investor
- Spouse: Married
- Children: 1

Aristotelis "Telis" Mistakidis (Greek: Αριστοτέλης "Τέλης" Μυστακίδης; born 21 November 1961) is a Greek-British businessman, investor and philanthropist. He spent approximately 25 years at Glencore and its predecessor Marc Rich & Co., becoming one of the company's senior metals executives and one of its largest individual shareholders. He became a billionaire following Glencore's initial public offering in 2011.

After leaving Glencore at the end of 2018, Mistakidis expanded his investments in banking, shipping and real estate. He subsequently acquired control of Aegean Baltic Bank and, in November 2025, became the majority owner of Greek basketball club PAOK BC.

In its 2026 annual billionaires list, Forbes estimated his wealth at approximately US$4.2 billion, while its real-time ranking valued his fortune at approximately US$4.7 billion in August 2026.

== Early life and education ==
Mistakidis was born in Rome, where his father, a marine biologist, worked for the United Nations. His family was Greek, and he maintained close links with Greece despite growing up abroad. In a 2011 interview with Kathimerini, Mistakidis said that Greek was spoken at home throughout his childhood and that he continued to speak Greek with his family.

He was educated in the United Kingdom and graduated from the London School of Economics with a degree in economics.

== Business career ==
=== Cargill and Glencore ===
Mistakidis began his career at Cargill, where he spent six years trading non-ferrous metals. In March 1993, he joined Marc Rich & Co., shortly before the company was acquired by its management and renamed Glencore. He initially worked in the zinc and lead business, developing expertise in metals marketing as well as price and risk management.

In February 2000, he became co-director of Glencore's zinc, copper and lead commodity department, jointly overseeing both its trading activities and industrial assets. Following the combination of the zinc and copper businesses, Mistakidis became one of the most senior executives in Glencore's global metals operation.

From 2008 to 2013 he served as co-head of Glencore's global copper and zinc department, and from 2013 until November 2017 he headed the company's global copper department.

The flotation of Glencore on the London and Hong Kong stock exchanges in May 2011 turned several senior partners, including Mistakidis, into billionaires. At the time of the IPO he controlled about 6% of the company.

== Investments ==
=== Banking ===
Mistakidis began building a substantial position in Piraeus Bank in 2020. In June of that year, his voting rights exceeded 5%, making him one of the bank's major private shareholders.

By January 2021, his direct stake had fallen below the 5% reporting threshold to approximately 3.03%. Later that year, he committed €40 million to Piraeus Financial Holdings' €1.38 billion capital increase. Following the transaction, his shareholding was approximately 2.9%.

In 2024, Mistakidis moved further into Greek banking by acquiring control of Aegean Baltic Bank (ABBank), a bank specialising in shipping finance. Agreements signed in April 2024 provided for him to acquire approximately 48% of its share capital and majority control of the institution.

The transaction subsequently received the required fit and proper approvals from the Bank of Greece and the European Central Bank in November 2024, allowing a company controlled by Mistakidis to obtain statutory majority control of ABBank.

=== Shipping ===
Mistakidis entered the shipping industry in 2021 as an investor in the London-based shipowner Union Maritime.

His interests subsequently expanded into both dry-bulk shipping and tankers. In 2026, shipping industry publications reported that Mistakidis also invested as a major shareholder in Virono Maritime.

=== Real estate ===
Mistakidis has also invested extensively in real estate all over the world.

In 2015, he purchased a duplex apartment in Chesham Place, Belgravia, London, for more than £46 million. The property, developed by Christian and Nick Candy, was at the time among the most expensive apartments ever sold in the United Kingdom.

From 2021 onward, he expanded his Greek property portfolio, with investments concentrated particularly in Athens, Thessaloniki and northern Greece. He also owns properties in Italy and in the USA.

== Sports investments ==
=== PAOK BC ===
In 2025, Mistakidis entered professional sports through PAOK BC, the basketball section of PAOK in Thessaloniki.

After financial, tax and legal due diligence, his investment company Alpha Sports Group Single Member S.A. reached an agreement to acquire the club's majority shareholding.

Under Mistakidis' ownership, the club also invested in its long-term infrastructure and player-development programme. In May 2026, PAOK announced the construction of a new privately operated basketball training centre in Pylaia, Thessaloniki, featuring two indoor courts and supporting training, medical and rehabilitation facilities.

== Wealth ==
Mistakidis first became a billionaire following Glencore's 2011 initial public offering.

The Sunday Times Rich List estimated his fortune at £2.153 billion in 2022.

Forbes estimated his net worth at US$4.2 billion on its annual 2026 World's Billionaires list. His Forbes real-time profile subsequently valued his fortune at approximately US$4.7 billion in August 2026.

== Personal life ==
Mistakidis holds both Greek and British citizenship and lives in Zug, Switzerland. He is married and has one child.
