= Filaret Galchev =

Russian businessman

Filaret Galchev Филарет Гальчев Φιλάρετος Καλτσίδης
- Born: Filaret Illitch Galchev; 26 May 1963 (age 63); Tarson, Tsalka District, Georgian SSR, Soviet Union (now Georgia)
- Citizenship: Greek, Russian
- Occupations: Former owner & chairman, Eurocement group
- Children: 2

Filaret Galchev (Russian: Филарет Гальчев; Greek: Φιλάρετος Καλτσίδης, romanized: Filaretos Kaltsidis; born 26 May 1963) is a Russian-Greek businessman who is former owner and chairman of Eurocement group.

== Early life ==
Filaret Illitch Galchev was born into an ethnic Greek family in Tarson, a small village in Tsalka District, Georgian Soviet Socialist Republic, on 26 May 1963. He graduated from Moscow Mining Institute.

== Career ==
In 2004 , Galchev and his partner, Georgy Krasnyansky, created Rosuglesbyt which became a leading Russian coal enterprise. In 2002, Galchev sold his stake in the company to the MDM Group and immediately bought shares of Sterncement because he saw potential in the cement industry. By 2004, Galchev's cement holdings produced 9.6 million tons of cement.

Then the Company was expanded and renamed in to Eurocement Group, becoming the largest cement producer in CIS region. Filaret Galchev sold Eurocement Group in 2020.

Filaret Galchev holds a position of professor at MISIS (University of science and technology).

== Personal life ==
He is married and has two children.
