= Vegas Oil and Gas =

Exploration & production company operating in Egypt

Vegas Oil and Gas S.A.
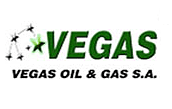
- Company type: Private
- Industry: Petroleum and gas exploration
- Founded: 2003
- Headquarters: Athens, Greece
- Area served: SE Europe, Northern Africa
- Key people: Giannis Vardinogiannis (Chairman); Hussein Kamel (V. Chairman)
- Products: Oil and Gas production
- Website: www.vegasoil.com

Vegas Oil and Gas S.A. is a company based in Egypt focusing on petroleum exploration and gas exploration. It is headquartered in Athens, but mainly operates from the Cairo suburb of Maadi.

Vegas is wholly owned by the Vardinogiannis family.

== Activities ==
Vegas is also a large E&P group of companies with assets in USA, Egypt and Yemen.

It is 50% shareholder and operator of the NW Gemsa concession, Circle Oil have a 40% interest and Sea Dragon Energy have the remaining 10%. Oil production from the NW Gemsa concession peaked at 9,000 bbl/d (1,400 m^{3}/d). All gas currently produced from the field is flared, due to sub-economic, low volumes.

Vegas is a 35% shareholder in the Alam El Shawish West concession, with Shell Egypt (operator, 40%), GDF Suez 25%.

It is operator and 50% shareholder of the East Ghazalat concession (Western Desert), with TransGlobe Energy Corporation holding the remaining 50%.

In August 2013, Vegas announced it had discovered oil, gas and condensate in Egypt.

== See also ==
- Energy in Egypt
