= Giannis Vardinogiannis =

Greek shipping businessman (born 1962)

Yannis Vardinoyannis
- Born: 7 April 1962 (age 64); Portsmouth, UK
- Education: Vassar College
- Occupations: Businessman and shipowner
- Board member of: Chairman & CEO, Motor Oil Hellas; Chaiman & CEO, Avin International S.A. CEO, Vegas Oil and Gas
- Spouse: Mellissa Gromel
- Children: 3
- Parent(s): Vardis Vardinoyannis; Marianna Vardinoyannis

Yannis Vardinoyannis (Greek: Γιάννης Βαρδινογιάννης, born 7 April 1962) is a Greek billionaire magnate, the eldest son of the late Vardis Vardinoyannis and of the late UNESCO Goodwill Ambassador Marianna Vardinoyannis. He is included in the Lloyd's List Most influential people in the shipping industry.

== Early life and career ==
Yannis Vardinoyannis was born in 1962 to Vardis Vardinoyannis and Marianna Vardinoyannis. He is of Cretan descent.

After graduating from the Athens College preparatory school, he majored in economics at Vassar College in the United States.

In May 1996, he married Mellissa Gromel. They have three sons, Vardis, Andreas, and Maximos.

He has been active in sports as he is a former car rally champion and a key person in the Greek football.

Vardinoyannis is a key person in the Vardinoyannis group of companies. The family controls Motor Oil Hellas, where Vardinoyannis is chairman and chief executive officer, and is chairman and CEO of Avin Oil. He was a non-executive board member in Piraeus Bank until June 2012.

He is the principal shareholder of the Cairo-based Vegas Oil and Gas.

== Business activities ==
Vardinoyannis joined the family business in the mid-1980s. In 2005 he joined the Board of Directors of Motor Oil Hellas and was appointed Executive Vice President in 2009. In January 2021 he was appointed CEO and, following the passing of Vardis Vardinoyannis, chairman of the board in November 2024.

He is credited for initiating the diversification of Motor Oil Hellas, by launching activities in the renewable energy sources sector.

In early 2024, More subsidiary completed the acquisition of Anemos RES and acquired a portfolio of 2.2 GW in renewables. Moreover, the group has active engagements in waste management and cyclical economy. As a result, in May 2024 the stock of Motor Oil Hellas reached an all-time high, bringing the valuation of the company to EUR 3 billion.

In 2018, he initiated the project for the transformation of the Investment Bank of Greece (IBG), which in the meantime had been acquired by Motor Oil Hellas. IBG was renamed to Optima Bank and listed on Athens Stock Exchange on 4 October 2023 and joined FTSE25 index on 23 December 2024. In October 2024 a company controlled by Yannis Vardinoyannis announced a EUR 475 million investment in tourism and hospitality in Greece. Furthermore, he is active in Greece and abroad in various sectors, including shipping, upstream, and real estate.

== Sports-related activities ==
In motor sports, he announced in early February 2024 the establishment of the private rally team Cyclon Rally Sport. In the past he had seven participations in the international Acropolis Rally from 1986 to 1992. He was the first Greek driver in Acropolis Rally for five years from 1988 to 1992. He won the Greek Rally title six times (1987 to 1992), driving Lancia Delta, with co-driver Kostas Stefanis.

In the summer of 2000, then President of Panathinaikos, Yiorgos Vardinogiannis stepped down and sold his share to Yannis Vardinoyannis. The latter changed the style of management into the club, while he continued working with the companies controlled by the family. In 2005, he was one of the founding members of the Super League Greece and elected president in 2007, being credited for his efforts to achieve European league standards in Greece. He stepped down in 2008. On 22 April 2008, he announced the decision of the Vardinoyannis family to reduce their share in Panathinaikos Football Club to 50% – after 30 years of full ownership – through an €80 million increase of the company's capital stock. After the negotiations and the share capital increase, the family would hold 56% of the club, Panathinaikos Athlitikos Omilos 10% and the rest of the shareholders 34%. The family finally withdrew from Panathinaikos in 2012. Under the chairmanship of Yannis Vardinoyannis, Panathinaikos F.C. reached the quarter-finals in Champions League in 2001–2002 and the quarter-finals in UEFA Cup in 2002–2003. The club won the Greek Football Championship and the Greek Cup in the years 2004, and 2010.

== Political views ==
In February 2015, Vardinoyannis said in a statement to Reuters that then Greek Prime Minister Alexis Tsipras had a valid point in attacking corrupt Greek oligarchs.
