= Anna Angelicoussis =

Greek shipowner

Anna Angelicoussis is a Greek shipowner and businesswoman. She was born in Kardamyla, Chios into the prominent Angelicoussis maritime family. After her father, Antoni Angelicoussis, died in 1989, she co-managed Anangel Shipping Enterprises with her brother John Angelicoussis until 2000, when they took separate paths.

In 2000, Angelicoussis co-founded Alpha Tankers & Freighters with her then-husband Christos Kanellakis. That same year, she began building her own business in shipping. Her companies include: Alpha Bulkers (dry bulk carriers); Pantheon Tankers (established in 2012, oil tankers); and Alpha Gas, (also launched in 2012, liquefied natural gas carriers).

In 2020, Angelicoussis was ranked 81st among the “Top 100 Most Influential Shipping Figures” by Lloyd’s List and named Greek Shipping Personality of the Year. In 2023, she received the Eukrantis Award for her contributions to Greek shipping.
