= Maria Angelicoussis =

Greek shipowner and billionaire

Maria Angelicoussis Μαρία Αγγελικούση
- Born: February 18, 1982 (age 44)
- Citizenship: Greece; United Kingdom
- Education: University of Cambridge (BM) University College London
- Occupation: Shipowner
- Known for: Owner of Angelicoussis Shipping Group
- Spouse: Lawrence Frankopan
- Children: 3

Maria Angelicoussis is a Greek shipowner, business magnate and the CEO and owner of Angelicoussis Group, one of the world's biggest private ship owning groups.

She was included in the Forbes List with an estimated fortune of US$7.6 billion.

She was included in the Lloyd's List "One Hundred Most Influential People in the Shipping Industry" list ranking 10th in 2022, 12th in 2023, and 8th in 2025.

She is member of the board of directors of the Union of Greek Shipowners.

Under the leadership of Maria Angelicoussis, the Angelicoussis Group completed the largest transaction in its history by acquiring Altera Shuttle Tankers, a UK-based owner and operator of 18 shuttle tankers.

In June 2026, Forbes Greece ranked Angelicoussis first on its list of the 50 leading Greek shipowners, valuing the Angelicoussis Group's fleet of 143 vessels at approximately US$17.5 billion.
