= Vardis Vardinogiannis =

Greek billionaire and oil executive (1933–2024)

- Βαρδής Βαρδινογιάννης
- Born: 4 December 1933; Episkopi, Greece
- Died: 12 November 2024 (aged 90); Ekali, Greece
- Resting place: First Cemetery of Athens
- Education: Hellenic Naval Academy
- Occupations: Oil and shipping businessman, Naval officer
- Years active: 1959–2024
- Known for: Chairman, Motor Oil Hellas; Chairman, Vegas Oil and Gas
- Spouse: Marianna Vardinoyannis (m. 1961; died 2023)
- Children: 5, including Giannis Vardinogiannis
- Parents: Giannis Vardinogiannis; Xrisi Theodoroulakis
- Relatives: Yiorgos Vardinogiannis (brother)
Vardis Vardinogiannis
- Military career
- Branch: Hellenic Navy
- Service years: 1955–1967; 1974-1983
- Rank: Rear Admiral

Vardis Vardinogiannis (Greek: Βαρδής Βαρδινογιάννης; 4 December 1933 – 12 November 2024) was a Greek billionaire oil and shipping businessman. He was the chairman and controlling shareholder of Motor Oil Hellas and Vegas Oil and Gas and involved in numerous other shipping and business interests. Vardinogiannis was included in Lloyd's List's Most Influential People in Shipping, and Forbes's The World's Billionaires with an estimated fortune of US$2.3 billion at the time of his death.

== Early life ==
Vardinogiannis was born on 4 December 1933 in Episkopi, the son of a farmer family from Agios Ioannis, Sfakia who had moved to Episkopi in the early 20th century. Vardinogiannis was in elementary school during the Second World War when Crete was occupied by the Germans. In the postwar years he moved to Athens, where he entered the Hellenic Naval Academy, from which he graduated in 1955 as an officer of the Greek Navy. He was forcibly retired and exiled on a remote island for opposing the Greek junta that ruled from 1967 to 1974.

== Business interests ==
Vardinogiannis joined his family's enterprise in the 1970s and helped it expand. The firm's growth was strengthened by his entering into a partnership with Aramco in the 1990s. Vardinogiannis and his relatives spread their net worldwide and control numerous successful companies in a variety of sectors. The interests include petroleum, shipping, banking, media, real estate, hotels, publishing and charity work. As of 2015, the Vardinogiannis family had stakes in 98 companies in total in Greece and abroad.

The Vardinogiannis brothers owned the merchant ship Ioanna V which, in 1966, broke the United Nations-imposed and British-enforced embargo on Rhodesia by bringing in oil to the Portuguese Mozambique port of Beira, which was connected with landlocked Rhodesia by a pipeline. This move yielded huge profits to the Group.

In subsequent years the four brothers continued to extend the group, staying away from publicity. After the fall of the Soviet Union, the group expanded in the new independent states of the Eastern Bloc, obtaining contracts for the opening of new highways in Ukraine and Georgia.

Together with George Bobolas, Christos Lambrakis, Christos Tegopoulos and Vardis Vardinogiannis, Alafouzos was one of the five founding members of the Teletypos company who created the first private Greek television channel, Mega TV. This began broadcasting in November 1989.

== Personal life and death ==
In 1961, Vardinogiannis married Marianna Bournaki and had five children, including Giannis Vardinogiannis. He was also the brother of shipping tycoon Yiorgos Vardinogiannis, known for being president of Panathinaikos F.C.

On 20 November 1990, the Revolutionary Organization 17 November attempted to murder Vardinogiannis. He was saved while inside his highly armored car.

Vardis Vardinogiannis and his wife Marianna were among the founders of the Robert Kennedy Human Rights Leadership Council, along with Bill Clinton and other world leaders. The wedding of Rory Kennedy and Mark Bailey was celebrated in Vardinogiannis's Greek mansion in upscale Ekali Athens. The 1993 wedding of Rory's older sister, Courtney Kennedy to Irishman Paul Hill was celebrated on the luxury yacht Varmar owned by Vardinogiannis.

Vardinogiannis died at his home, in Ekali, on 12 November 2024, at age 90.
