= List of shipwrecks in 1981 =

The list of shipwrecks in 1981 includes ships sunk, foundered, grounded, or otherwise lost during 1981.

table of contents
1981
Jan	Feb	Mar	Apr
May	Jun	Jul	Aug
Sep	Oct	Nov	Dec
Unknown date

== January ==
=== 1 January ===
List of shipwrecks: 1 January 1981
Ship	State	Description
Big Sea	United States	The fishing vessel sank while tied to a buoy in Port Etches on the south-central coast of Alaska.
Mercy Bee	United States	The fishing vessel capsized in heavy surf in Squaw Bay (60°49′15″N 147°50′30″W) on the south-central coast of Alaska.

=== 6 January ===
List of shipwrecks: 7 January 1981
Ship	State	Description
Novo Amapá	Brazil	According to Federal government of Brazil official confirmed report, the Passenger ship sinks at the mouth of the Cajari River, Pará / Amapá state border, Brazil, 186 persons were rescued and survived, killing more than 130 people.

=== 7 January ===
List of shipwrecks: 7 January 1981
Ship	State	Description
José Martin	Soviet Union	The tanker ran aground off Dalarö, Sweden.

=== 17 January ===
List of shipwrecks: 17 January 1981
Ship	State	Description
Fourat Star	Syria	The coaster was driven ashore at Limassol, Cyprus. She was scrapped in situ.

=== 22 January ===
List of shipwrecks: 22 January 1981
Ship	State	Description
Evangelistria V	Iceland	The fishing vessel was wrecked, a total loss.

=== 26 January ===
List of shipwrecks: 26 January 1981
Ship	State	Description
Deifovos	Greece	The cargo ship sank off Vega, with the loss of nine of her 37 crew.

=== 27 January ===
List of shipwrecks: 27 January 1981
Ship	State	Description
Tampomas II	Indonesia	The ferry caught fire and sank in a storm in the Java Sea 500 nautical miles (930 km) north east of Java. She was carrying a 1,136 people, of whom 762 were reported to have been rescued.

=== 30 January ===
List of shipwrecks: 30 January 1981
Ship	State	Description
Ems	West Germany	The cargo ship sank after collision with Undine (Belgium) off Happisburgh, England (52°55′N 1°37′E). Six crew were rescued by Undine and taken to Vlissingen, Netherlands. Thirteen others were rescued by helicopter and taken to Great Yarmouth. Four crew were killed.
Frederika 1	West Germany	The cargo ship sank after colliding with Blackthorn (United Kingdom) in the River Thames at Greenwich. All five crew were rescued by the tug Redriff (United Kingdom).

=== Unknown date ===
List of shipwrecks: unknown date January 1981
Ship	State	Description
Golden Princess	Greece	The passenger ship sank in a storm while laid up at Perama, Greece.

== February ==
=== 6 February ===
List of shipwrecks: 6 February 1981
Ship	State	Description
Nellie M	United Kingdom	The Troubles: The coaster was sunk at Lough Foyle after being boarded and bombed by an IRA team on a hijacked lifeboat. The ship was raised and refitted in 1982, sold to an Irish company and renamed Ellie (Republic of Ireland).

=== 8 February ===
List of shipwrecks: 8 February 1981
Ship	State	Description
Burgundia	Panama	Burgundia The coaster was driven ashore at Castlerock, County Londonderry, United Kingdom. She later caught fire and was declared a constructive total loss and consequently scrapped. Burgundia was on a voyage from Coleraine, County Londonderry to Portugal.

=== 13 February ===
List of shipwrecks: 13 February 1981
Ship	State	Description
Eastern Mariner I	Panama	The cargo ship was damaged in a storm, and sank three days later east of Bermuda (32°19.36′N 64°31.30′W).
Wood Duck	United States	The 32-foot (9.8 m) fishing vessel sank in Union Bay in the Alexander Archipelago in Southeast Alaska in a violent storm. Her owner-operator died in the sinking.

=== 19 February ===
List of shipwrecks: 19 February 1981
Ship	State	Description
Akra Aktion	Greece	The cargo ship ran aground off Mangalia, Romania and sank.

=== 24 February ===
List of shipwrecks: 24 February 1981
Ship	State	Description
Uyak	United States	The 60-foot (18 m) fishing vessel sank off Humpback Rock in Chiniak Bay on the coast of Kodiak Island near Kodiak, Alaska.

=== 26 February ===
List of shipwrecks: 26 February 1981
Ship	State	Description
USS Glennon	United States Navy	The Gearing-class destroyer was sunk as a target off Puerto Rico.

=== 28 February ===
List of shipwrecks: 28 February 1981
Ship	State	Description
Dae Rim	South Korea	The 291-foot (88.7 m) cargo ship caught fire and washed ashore at Cape Wrangell on the coast of Attu Island in the Aleutian Islands with the loss of 24 lives. There were two survivors.

=== Unknown date ===
List of shipwrecks: Unknown date February 1981
Ship	State	Description
Jupiter	United States	The 82-foot (25.0 m) fishing vessel was wrecked on Sozavarika Island (54°51′20″N 162°31′35″W) off the south coast of the Alaska Peninsula in Alaska. Her crew of five survived.

== March ==
=== 4 March ===
List of shipwrecks: 4 March 1981
Ship	State	Description
Pacific Angel	United States	The 94-foot (28.7 m) crab-fishing vessel was wrecked without loss of life on Chowiet Island (56°02′N 156°42′W) in the Semidi Islands southwest of Kodiak Island.

=== 8 March ===
List of shipwrecks: 8 March 1981
Ship	State	Description
Mezada	Israel	The cargo ship sank in rough seas about 100 nautical miles (190 km) southeast of Bermuda. Eleven of 35 crew rescued.

=== 13 March ===
List of shipwrecks: 13 March 1981
Ship	State	Description
Daito Maru No. 55	Japan	The 105-foot (32.0 m) fishing trawler sank in the Bering Sea about 380 nautical miles (700 km; 440 mi) northwest of Adak in the Aleutian Islands with the loss of her entire crew of 26.

=== 25 March ===
List of shipwrecks: 25 March 1981
Ship	State	Description
Rio Bravo	Greece	The cargo ship caught fire and sank 600 nautical miles (1,100 km) south west of the Azores. All 27 crew rescued.

== April ==
=== 9 April ===
List of shipwrecks: 9 April 1981
Ship	State	Description
Nisho Maru	Japan	The ballistic missile submarine USS George Washington (United States Navy) surfaced underneath the cargo ship, sinking her with the loss of two of her crew.

== May ==
=== 14 May ===
List of shipwrecks: 14 May 1981
Ship	State	Description
Olfert Fischer	Denmark	The Niels Juel-class corvette was damaged by an engine room fire off Bornholm on her sea trials. Subsequently repaired but commissioning delayed from 25 May to 16 October.

=== 19 May ===
List of shipwrecks: 19 May 1981
Ship	State	Description
Bering Scout	United States	The 65-foot (19.8 m) tug sank with the loss of three lives in Etolin Strait on the west-central coast of Alaska.

=== 20 May ===
List of shipwrecks: 20 May 1981
Ship	State	Description
Alkmini	Greece	The cargo ship collided with the motor vessel Duro Seis (Spain) in the English Channel and sank. All 28 people on board were rescued by helicopter and taken to Cherbourg, France.

=== 22 May ===
List of shipwrecks: 22 May 1981
Ship	State	Description
Unidentified	Libya	Lebanese Civil War: The cargo ship exploded at Tyre, Lebanon. She had been chased into harbor by an Israeli Navy warship.

== June ==
=== 1 June ===
List of shipwrecks: 1 June 1981
Ship	State	Description
Reina del Mar	Greece	The passenger ship was scuttled off Kynosoura, Greece.

=== 15 June ===
List of shipwrecks: 15 June 1981
Ship	State	Description
Charity	Netherlands	She collided with Good Captain (Greece) and sank 15 nautical miles (28 km) off Pantellaria Islands, Italy.

=== 18 June ===
List of shipwrecks: 18 June 1981
Ship	State	Description
Bracon	Norway	The stripped, out of service, trawler, a sold off Round Table-class trawler, was scuttled in Bjornefjorden.

=== Unknown date ===
List of shipwrecks: Unknown date 1981
Ship	State	Description
Unknown patrol ship	Korean People's Navy	The patrol ship was sunk by South Korean coastal batteries. Nine crewmen were killed, one captured and four rescued.

== July ==
=== 3 July ===
List of shipwrecks: 3 July 1981
Ship	State	Description
Arctic Explorer	Canada	The icebreaker sank off St. Anthony, Newfoundland, Canada. Thirteen of her 32 crew were killed.

=== 12 July ===
List of shipwrecks: 12 July 1981
Ship	State	Description
USNS Wheeling	United States Navy	The inactivated Wheeling-class missile range instrumentation ship was sunk as a target by Harpoon missiles.

=== 20 July ===
List of shipwrecks: 20 July 1981
Ship	State	Description
Shoshone	United States	The 76-foot (23 m) fishing vessel struck a rock and sank 2 nautical miles (3.7 km) north of Egg Island in the Aleutian Islands. The fishing vessel Captain Banjo (United States) rescued her entire crew of five.

=== 27 July ===
List of shipwrecks: 27 July 1981
Ship	State	Description
Sir Winston Churchill	United Kingdom	The schooner ran aground 4 nautical miles (7.4 km) off Great Yarmouth, Norfolk. Later refloated and returned to service.

== August ==
=== 2 August ===
List of shipwrecks: 2 August 1981
Ship	State	Description
Primrose	Bangladesh	The 16,000-ton freighter ran aground on North Sentinel Island. The crew were rescued a week later.

=== 3 August ===
List of shipwrecks: 3 August 1981
Ship	State	Description
Melpo Lemos	Greece	The tanker ran aground on the Lepe Bank, in the Solent off Southampton, United Kingdom. She was refloated the next day.
Prince Ivanhoe	United Kingdom	The former ferry struck a rock and sank at Horton, Swansea. All 450 on board rescued but one passenger suffered a heart attack and died.

=== 4 August ===
List of shipwrecks: 4 August 1981
Ship	State	Description
Louis G	United States	The seiner capsized and sank off Cape Bartolome (55°14′N 133°37′W) in Southeast Alaska. The fishing vessel Delight (United States) rescued her entire crew of five.

=== 7 August ===
List of shipwrecks: 7 August 1981
Ship	State	Description
Winterwind	United States	After the 43-foot (13 m) fishing vessel began taking on water, she drifted onto the tow line of a passing barge and sank in Cook Inlet 10 nautical miles (19 km) off Clam Gulch, Alaska, after the barge collided with her.

=== 10 August ===
List of shipwrecks: 10 August 1981
Ship	State	Description
Karen E	United States	The 35-foot (11 m) cabin cruiser sank with the loss of five lives in eastern Long Island Sound off Rocky Point, Long Island, New York, in waters probably over 100 feet (30 m) deep after colliding with a barge.

=== 20 August ===
List of shipwrecks: 20 August 1981
Ship	State	Description
Cowboy	United States	The fishing vessel was lost in bad weather in the Gulf of Alaska.

=== 21 August ===
List of shipwrecks: 21 August 1981
Ship	State	Description
Northern King	United States	The 96-foot (29.3 m) trawler-processor developed a heavy list in a storm in the Bering Sea off Cape Lieskof (55.7883°N 162.0542°W), Alaska, then capsized and sank near Nelson Lagoon (55°50′N 162°05′W). Her seven crew members abandoned ship 4 nautical miles (7.4 km) off the Alaska Peninsula; two were lost, but the other five made it to shore in a life raft and were rescued.
Rocket	United States	The 34-foot (10.4 m) vessel capsized in Strawberry Pass (60°24′N 146°03′W) near Montague Island at the entrance to Prince William Sound on the south-central coast of Alaska with the loss of both people on board.

=== 26 August ===
List of shipwrecks: 26 August 1981
Ship	State	Description
Pushka	United States	The vessel was wrecked at Sanak Point (54°23′N 162°35′W), probably off Sanak Island in the Aleutian Islands. The fishing vessel Casade (United States) rescued her entire crew of three.

== September ==
=== 7 September ===
List of shipwrecks: 7 September 1981
Ship	State	Description
Misty	United States	The 86-foot (26.2 m) fishing trawler burned and sank in Marmot Bay (58°00′N 152°06′W) off Alaska′s Kodiak Archipelago. The fishing vessel Trailblazer (United States) rescued her entire crew of five.

=== 9 September ===
List of shipwrecks: 9 September 1981
Ship	State	Description
Lady Simpson	United States	The crabber-trawler sank in the Bering Sea about 72 nautical miles (133 km; 83 mi) north of Dutch Harbor, Alaska. A Japanese fishing trawler rescued her crew of six 28 hours later.

=== 13 September ===
List of shipwrecks: 13 September 1981
Ship	State	Description
HMS Rapid	Royal Navy	The decommissioned Q and R-class destroyer was sunk as a torpedo target in the Western Approaches by the submarine HMS Onyx (Royal Navy).

=== 14 September ===
List of shipwrecks: 14 September 1981
Ship	State	Description
City of Seattle	United States	The 84-foot (25.6 m) crab-fishing vessel burned and sank in the Shelikof Strait 5 nautical miles (9.3 km; 5.8 mi) south of Cape Uganik (57°58′N 153°30′W) on the coast of Uganik Island in Alaska′s Kodiak Archipelago. The medium endurance cutter USCGC Confidence ( United States Coast Guard) rescued her entire crew of six. She later was salvaged, repaired, and returned to service.
Spring	United States	The 42-foot (12.8 m) troller sank 2 nautical miles (3.7 km; 2.3 mi) off Ratz Harbor (55°53′15″N 132°35′45″W) on the northeast coast of Prince of Wales Island in the Alexander Archipelago in Southeast Alaska.

=== 18 September ===
List of shipwrecks: 18 September 1981
Ship	State	Description
HDMS MHV 68	Royal Danish Navy	The cutter ran aground off Læsø. She sank the next day.

=== 19 September ===
List of shipwrecks: 19 September 1981
Ship	State	Description
Periphery	United States	The 32-foot (9.8 m) fishing vessel broke up and sank in heavy seas while under tow by the vessel Billy Don (United States) in the Shelikof Strait between the Kodiak Archipelago and mainland Alaska.
Sobral Santos II	Brazil	The ferry sank in the harbour of Óbidos, Pará with the loss of an unknown number of people. Estimates range from 50 to 300.

=== 20 September ===
List of shipwrecks: 20 September 1981
Ship	State	Description
Tungufoss	Iceland	The coaster sank in a storm 4 nautical miles (7.4 km) off Land's End, Cornwall, United Kingdom. All of the crew were rescued, either, by helicopter from RNAS Culdrose or the Sennen Cove lifeboat.

=== 21 September ===
List of shipwrecks: 21 September 1981
Ship	State	Description
BRP Datu Kalantiaw	Philippine Navy	BRP Datu Kalantiaw Typhoon Clara: The Datu Kalantiaw-class frigate was driven ashore on Calayan Island in the Philippines with the loss of 79 of her 97 crew.

=== 24 September ===
List of shipwrecks: 24 September 1981
Ship	State	Description
Dimitris	Greece	The 963 GRT freighter (formerly known as Harrogate of Associated Humber Lines) flooded, foundered and was lost.

=== 27 September ===
List of shipwrecks: 27 September 1981
Ship	State	Description
Sea Foam	United States	The fishing vessel was wrecked in Summers Bay (53°54′45″N 166°27′30″W) on the coast of Unalaska Island in the Aleutian Islands.

=== 30 September ===
List of shipwrecks: 30 September 1981
Ship	State	Description
The Faith	United States	The barge, a converted landing craft mechanized with three divers aboard, sprang a leak and sank in Shotgun Cove (60°48′05″N 148°32′30″W) near Whittier, Alaska. The fishing vessel Tommel (United States), which had towned The Faith to the cove, rescued the three divers.

=== Unknown date ===
List of shipwrecks: unknown date 1981
Ship	State	Description
Chrisoula K	Greece	Ran aground on the Sha`b Abu Nuhas reef and later sank.

== October ==
=== 21 October ===
List of shipwrecks: 21 October 1981
Ship	State	Description
S-178	Soviet Navy	The Whiskey-class submarine was rammed and sunk by the refrigerator ship Refrizkerator-13 (Soviet Union) in Golden Horn Bay on the Sea of Japan coast of the Soviet Union. Thirty-one of her crew were killed.

=== 22 October ===
List of shipwrecks: 22 October 1981
Ship	State	Description
Elusive	United States	After a fire broke out in her engine room, the 86-foot (26.2 m) fishing vessel burned and sank near Cape Ikolik (57°17′15″N 154°47′00″W) on the coast of Alaska′s Kodiak Island. The fishing vessel Gerry D (United States) rescued her crew of five.

=== 27 October ===
List of shipwrecks: 27 October 1981
Ship	State	Description
Diane O	United States	After her engine broke down, the 26-foot (7.9 m) fishing vessel drifted into the surf and broke up on the south coast of Nunivak Island in the Bering Sea.

=== 28 October ===
List of shipwrecks: 28 October 1981
Ship	State	Description
S-363	Soviet Navy	The Whiskey-class submarine ran aground off Karlskrona, Sweden and was damaged. After a diplomatic incident and military standoff, the submarine was refloated on 5 November and towed into international waters for handover to the Soviet Navy.

=== 30 October ===
List of shipwrecks: 30 October 1981
Ship	State	Description
Gem	United States	The 47-foot (14.3 m) fishing vessel struck a rock and sank in Cape Spencer in Southeast Alaska. Three of her four crewmen survived.

=== 31 October ===
List of shipwrecks: 31 October 1981
Ship	State	Description
Telamon	Greece	Telamon's wreck in 2013 The cargo ship was beached at Arrecife, Lanzarote, Canary Islands after developing a leak. The wreck later broke in two, the forward part sank, and the after part remained above water. Scrapping began in September 2022.

== November ==
=== 12 November ===
List of shipwrecks: 12 November 1981
Ship	State	Description
Aleutian Monarch	United States	After she caught fire and burned for five days, the 460-foot (140.2 m) fish processing vessel was towed out to sea and scuttled near Beaver Inlet (53°50′N 166°15′W) on the coast of Unalaska Island in the Aleutian Islands.

=== 15 November ===
List of shipwrecks: 15 November 1981
Ship	State	Description
USS Charles R. Ware	United States Navy	The decommissioned Gearing-class destroyer was sunk as a target in the Caribbean.

=== 26 November ===
List of shipwrecks: 26 November 1981
Ship	State	Description
Globe Asimi	Gibraltar	The tanker ran aground at Klaipėda, Lithuanian SSR and broke in two.

=== 27 November ===
List of shipwrecks: 27 November 1981
Ship	State	Description
Elma Tres	West Germany	The cargo ship foundered 215 nautical miles (398 km) west of Hamilton, Bermuda with the loss of all but one of her 24 crew.
Euro Princess	Yugoslavia	The cargo ship ran aground off Sable Island, Nova Scotia, Canada. All 26 crew rescued by helicopter.
Nannie D	United States	The 32-foot (9.8 m) fishing vessel sank southwest of Seward, Alaska, with the loss of her entire crew of three.

=== 30 November ===
List of shipwrecks: 30 November 1981
Ship	State	Description
Cuttlefish	United Kingdom	The 94.5-foot (28.8 m), 153-ton oil rig standby (safety) boat, a converted trawler, ran aground and was wrecked on a sandbank 10 miles (16 km) off the coast of Norfolk.
Saint Patrick	United States	The 458-gross register ton 138.2-foot (42.1 m) scallop-fishing trawler was abandoned in the Gulf of Alaska 5 nautical miles (9.3 km) east of Marmot Island near Kodiak, Alaska, after a large wave laid her over. Only two men of her crew of 11 men and one woman survived. Days later, Saint Patrick was found floating derelict in the outer part of Marmot Bay and was towed to Womens Bay, Alaska, where she sank.

== December ==
=== 8 December ===
List of shipwrecks: 8 December 1981
Ship	State	Description
Garnet	Panama	The reefer collided with Molaventure (Liberia) ten kilometres (6.2 mi) off Port Said, Egypt and was beached to prevent sinking. One crewman was killed. The ship was abandoned as a constructive total loss. Later refloated and towed to deep water and scuttled.
Molaventure	Liberia	The tanker collided with Garnet (Panama) ten kilometres (6.2 mi) off Port Said, Egypt and was beached. Later she was able to resume her voyage.

=== 13 December ===
List of shipwrecks: 13 December 1981
Ship	State	Description
Bonita	Ecuador	The cargo ship capsized when two massive waves struck her in the English Channel 40 nautical miles (74 km; 46 mi) north of Guernsey while on a voyage from Hamburg, West Germany, to Panama with a cargo of fertiliser. One member of her crew was lost; the rest were saved by a Royal Navy helicopter and the St Peter’s Lifeboat Sir William Arnold ( Royal National Lifeboat Institution).
Kaliakh	United States	The 86-foot (26.2 m) motor scow dragged her anchor, drifted onto the rocks, capsized, and was lost in Iliasik Passage (55°02′N 161°55′W) between Inner Iliasik Island and Outer Iliasik Island in the Shumagin Islands off the south-central coast of Alaska. Her crew survived and was rescued by the tug Jeffrey Foss (United States).

=== 14 December ===
List of shipwrecks: 14 December 1981
Ship	State	Description
Grain Ville	United Kingdom	The cargo ship foundered off County Wexford, Ireland. Five of her nine crew were rescued.

=== 19 December ===
List of shipwrecks: 19 December 1981
Ship	State	Description
Mark	Panama	The coaster was lost in Mount's Bay, Cornwall while bound for Spezia, Spain with a cargo of china clay from Teignmouth. All six of her crew were lost and the wreck has never been found.
Solomon Browne	Royal National Lifeboat Institution	Penlee lifeboat disaster: The lifeboat was lost in a gale while attempting to rescue the crew of Union Star (Republic of Ireland) off Tater Du, Cornwall, England. Her entire crew of eight was lost along with all survivors of Union Star she had taken aboard.
Union Star	Republic of Ireland	Penlee lifeboat disaster: The coastal cargo ship was lost on her maiden voyage due to engine failure in a gale. She was wrecked off Tater Du, Cornwall, England, ending up capsized on the rocks. All eight people on board – her master, her master's wife and two daughters, and her four crewmen – were lost, either on board Union Star or in the sinking of the rescue lifeboat Solomon Browne ( Royal National Lifeboat Institution).

=== 20 December ===
List of shipwrecks: 20 December 1981
Ship	State	Description
Arion	Greece	The ferry, arriving at Haifa from Greece, suffered onboard explosion and fire from a terrorist bomb and was beached. Later towed to Piraeus for lay-up, and to Spain for demolition in 1984.

=== 23 December ===
List of shipwrecks: 23 December 1981
Ship	State	Description
Dimitrios	Greece	Dimitrios The laid-up cargo ship was swept from her offshore anchorage by a storm and wrecked on the beach at Valtaki, near Gythio, Greece.

=== 28 December ===
List of shipwrecks: 28 December 1981
Ship	State	Description
Unidentified patrol vessel	People's Republic of Kampuchea	The navy patrol vessel was sunk by three Royal Thai Navy vessels off Koh Kang Province, Cambodia. Of her crew of six Vietnamese and seven Cambodians, eight were killed and five became prisoners-of-war.

=== 29 December ===
List of shipwrecks: 29 December 1981
Ship	State	Description
Sue	United States	The 32-foot (9.8 m) fishing vessel sank in Izhut Bay (58°11′N 152°15′W) on the coast of Afognak Island in the Kodiak Archipelago after striking a log. The fishing vessel Amber Dawn (United States) rescued her crew of two.

=== 30 December ===
List of shipwrecks: 30 December 1981
Ship	State	Description
Marina di Equa	Italy	The bulk carrier sank in the Bay of Biscay with the loss of all thirty crew.

== Unknown date ==
List of shipwrecks: Unknown date 1981
Ship	State	Description
Aurore	Australia	The fishing trawler, a former yacht, sank in the D'Entrecasteaux Channel after sriking an unidentified object. she was later refloated and restored to her original configuration as a yacht.
Garoar BA 64	Iceland	The decommissioned fishing vessel was run aground and abandoned on the Patreksfjordur fjord coastline, 10.6 miles (17.1 km) from Patreksfjordur village sometime in 1981.
Holland XXIV	Netherlands	The dredger was beached at Cleveleys.
J. P. Webb	Australia	The hopper barge sank off Port Lillias.
USS Ozark	United States Navy	USS Ozark sinking Serving as a target ship, the decommissioned mine countermeasures support ship sank in the Gulf of Mexico 28 to 30 miles (45 to 48 km) due south of Destin, Florida, the day after being hit by a Maverick missile fired by a United States Air Force F-4 Phantom II aircraft from Eglin Air Force Base, Florida.
