= Growthfund =

Holding company of Greek state

Hellenic Corporation of Assets and Participations S.A.
- Native name: Ελληνική Εταιρεία Συμμετοχών και Περιουσίας Α.Ε.
- Type: Anonymi Etairia
- Industry: Asset management
- Founded: 2016
- Headquarters: Athens, Greece
- Area served: Greece
- Total assets: ▲$12 billion (2025)
- Owner: State of Greece (100%)
- Website: growthfund.gr

Growthfund (officially: Hellenic Corporation of Assets and Participations S.A. (HCAP)) is a holding company founded in 2016 with the Greek government as its sole shareholder, represented by the Minister of Economy and Finance. As Greece's sovereign wealth fund, its mission is to actively contribute to the modernization of state-owned enterprises, maximize the value of public assets, ensure the provision of improved services to citizens and consumers, and contribute to the support of the Greek economy.

In July 2025, assets under management (AUM) are estimated at $12 billion.

== History ==
Founded in 2011, the Hellenic Republic Asset Development Fund (HRADF)^{[1]} is, so to speak, the predecessor and, in part, still the namesake of the Growth Fund, which was founded in 2016. All of the HRADF's responsibilities and resources have now been transferred to the Growth Fund.

In 2023, the Greek government commissioned US asset manager BlackRock to optimize the structures of its sovereign wealth fund, state-owned enterprises, and assets. This is to be accompanied by a modernization of postal and bus services.

In July 2024, Vasilis Theofanopoulos was appointed as the fund's new CIO.

In April 2025, the European Investment Bank (EIB) announced that it would advise the Growth Fund on making key ports in Greece more climate-resilient. Specifically, the bank is supporting the fund with climate risk and vulnerability assessments for the ports of Volos, Alexandroupoli, and Patras in order to adapt them to climate change and its consequences.

At the beginning of 2025, it was announced that a new Catalyst Fund would be launched under the Growth Fund, modeled on Cofides and the Indonesian Investment Authority. The new investment fund will focus on green infrastructure and digitalization projects that contribute to the country's economic growth. The aim is for every euro of its capital to attract up to three euros in private investment. The sovereign wealth fund will only take minority stakes, and its initial contribution will be between €20 million and €50 million.

== Structure ==
The Growthfund—as it is commonly known—combines the following four entities under the official name Hellenic Corporation of Assets and Participations S.A. (HCAP):

- Hellenic Financial Stability Fund (HFSF)
- Hellenic Republic Asset Development Fund (HRADF)
- Public Properties Company (ETAD)
- 5G Ventures

The Greek state's holdings in state-owned companies that were transferred to the Growth Fund are referred to as "other subsidiaries."

HCAP is owned by the Greek state. The supreme body of HCAP is the general meeting of its sole shareholder, the Greek state, legally represented by the Greek Minister of Finance.

== Portfolio ==
The fund's portfolio includes state-owned companies and shares in private companies operating in key sectors of the Greek economy:

=== Real estate ===
- Hellenic Public Properties Company (100%, non-listed)
- GAIAOSE
- ETVA-VIPE
- TIF – Helexpo (100%, non-listed)

=== Energy & utilities ===
- Public Power Corporation (21.82%)
- HELLENiQ Energy (31.18%)
- DEPA Commercial (100%, non-listed)
- EYATH - Thessaloniki Water and Sewerage Company (19.02%)
- EYDAP - Athens Water Supply and Sewerage Company (11.33%)

=== Transportation and infrastructure ===
- Transport for Athens (100%, non-listed)
- Corinth Canal (100%, non-listed)
- Athens International Airport (25.6%)
- 23 regional airports
- Piraeus Port Authority (7.14%)
- Thessaloniki Port Authority (7.3%)
- 10 regional port authorities
- HIIF - Hellenic Innovation & Infrastructure Fund (100%, non-listed)

=== Food ===
- Central Market of Thessaloniki - CMT (100%, non-listed)
- Central Markets and Fishery Organization - CMFO (100%, non-listed)
- Hellenic Saltworks (80%, non-listed)

=== Technology ===
- 5G Ventures - PHAISTOS Investment Fund (100%, non-listed)
- PHAROS AI Factory (70%, non-listed)
- Hellenic Center for Defense Innovation - HCDI (33%)

=== Post ===
- Hellenic Post (100%, non-listed)

=== Banks ===
- National Bank of Greece (8.39%)
- CrediaBank (29.32%)

In addition, the portfolio includes the Project Preparation Facility (PPF), which is responsible for developing and tendering strategic projects worth over €8 billion.

== Memberships ==
The Growthfund is a member of the International Forum of Sovereign Wealth Funds (IFSWF) and is therefore committed to the Santiago Principles for appropriate conduct and proper business practices.
