= Telamon (disambiguation) =

Telamon was the father of the hero Ajax in Greek mythology.

Telamon may also refer to:

- Latin name of the Italian town of Talamone
- An architectural support sculpted in the form of a man, also called an atlas (architecture)
- The Telamon, an ancient Greek song
- 1749 Telamon, a Jupiter Trojan asteroid
- Telamon (crater), a crater on Saturn's moon Phoebe
- Battle of Telamon, a battle involving the Gauls and the Roman Republic
- Lews Therin Telamon, a fictional character in the book series The Wheel of Time
- Ships
  - USS Telamon, an American naval ship
  - MV Telamon, a cargo ship originally named Temple Hall, beached at Arrecife since 1981
