= Pantelis =

Pantelis or Pandelis (Greek Παντελής; Modern: [pa de ˈlis]) is a name of Greek origin that is the given name of:

== Pantelis ==
- Pantelis Horn, a Greek naval officer and playwright of Austrian origins
- Pantelis Kafes, a Greek footballer
- Pantelis Kapetanos, a Greek football player
- Pantelis Karasevdas, a Greek shooter
- Pantelis Konstantinidis, a Greek footballer
- Pantelis Pantelidis, Greek singer-songwriter
- Pantelis Zervos, a Greek theatrical and film actor

== Pandelis ==
- Pandelis Karayorgis (born 1962), Greek musician
- Pandelis Pouliopoulos (1900–1943), Greek communist
- Pandelis Prevelakis (1909–1986), Greek writer

== See also ==
- Pantelić, Serbian surname
- MV Pantelis, a cargo ship beached in Arrecife since 1981.
