= Algeria–Greece relations =

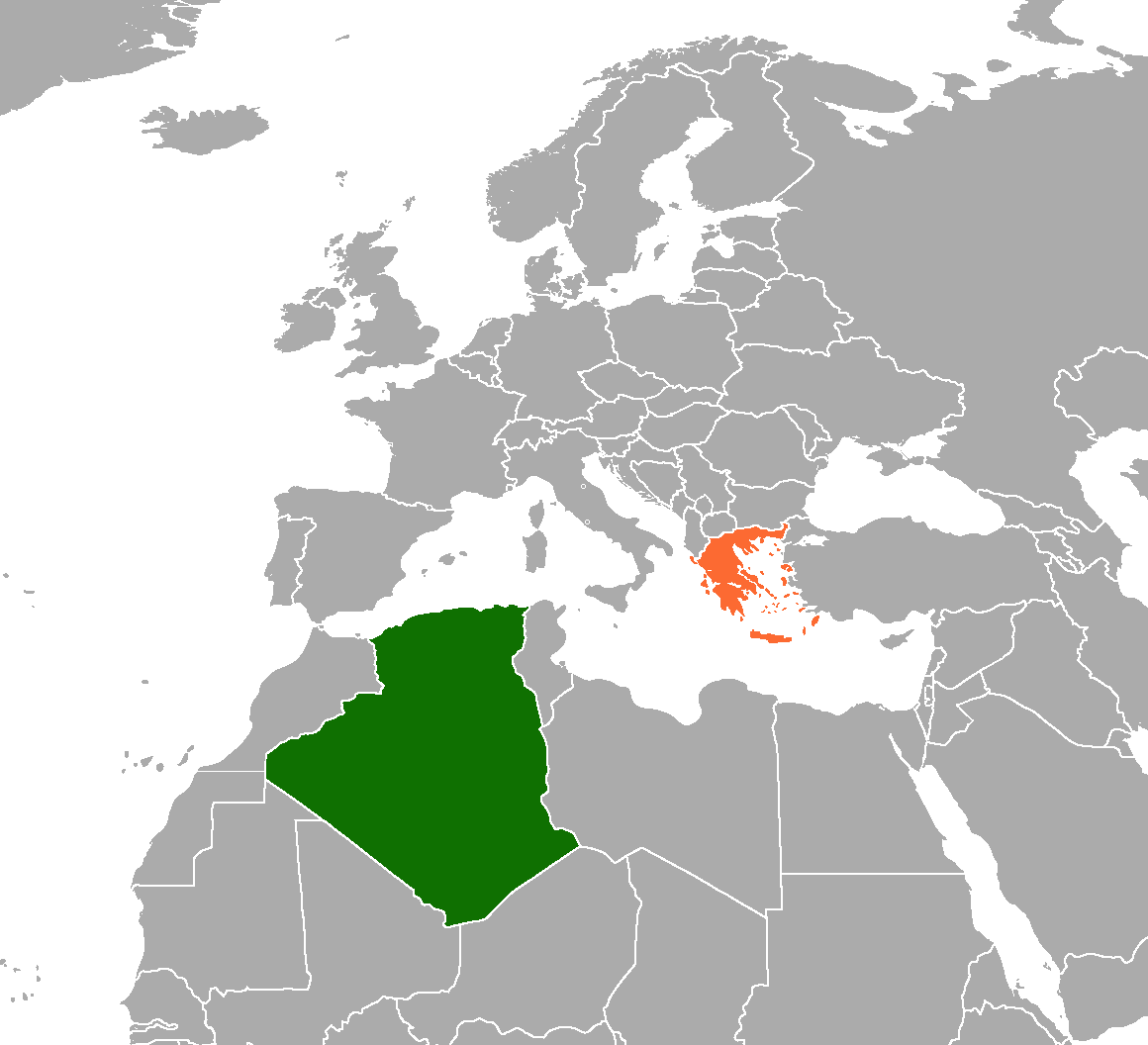
- Algeria: Greece

Diplomatic relations between Algeria and Greece date back for more than 2000 years. Diplomatic relations have been solid since Algeria's first years of independence. Greece maintains an embassy in Algiers, and Algeria is represented in Greece by its embassy in Athens. Trade between Greece and Algeria is increasing, with imports of natural gas from Algeria an important factor. There have been problems with illegal immigration from Algeria to Greece in recent years, and with Algerian trafficking of Sub-Saharan Africans seeking to enter the European Union.

== History ==
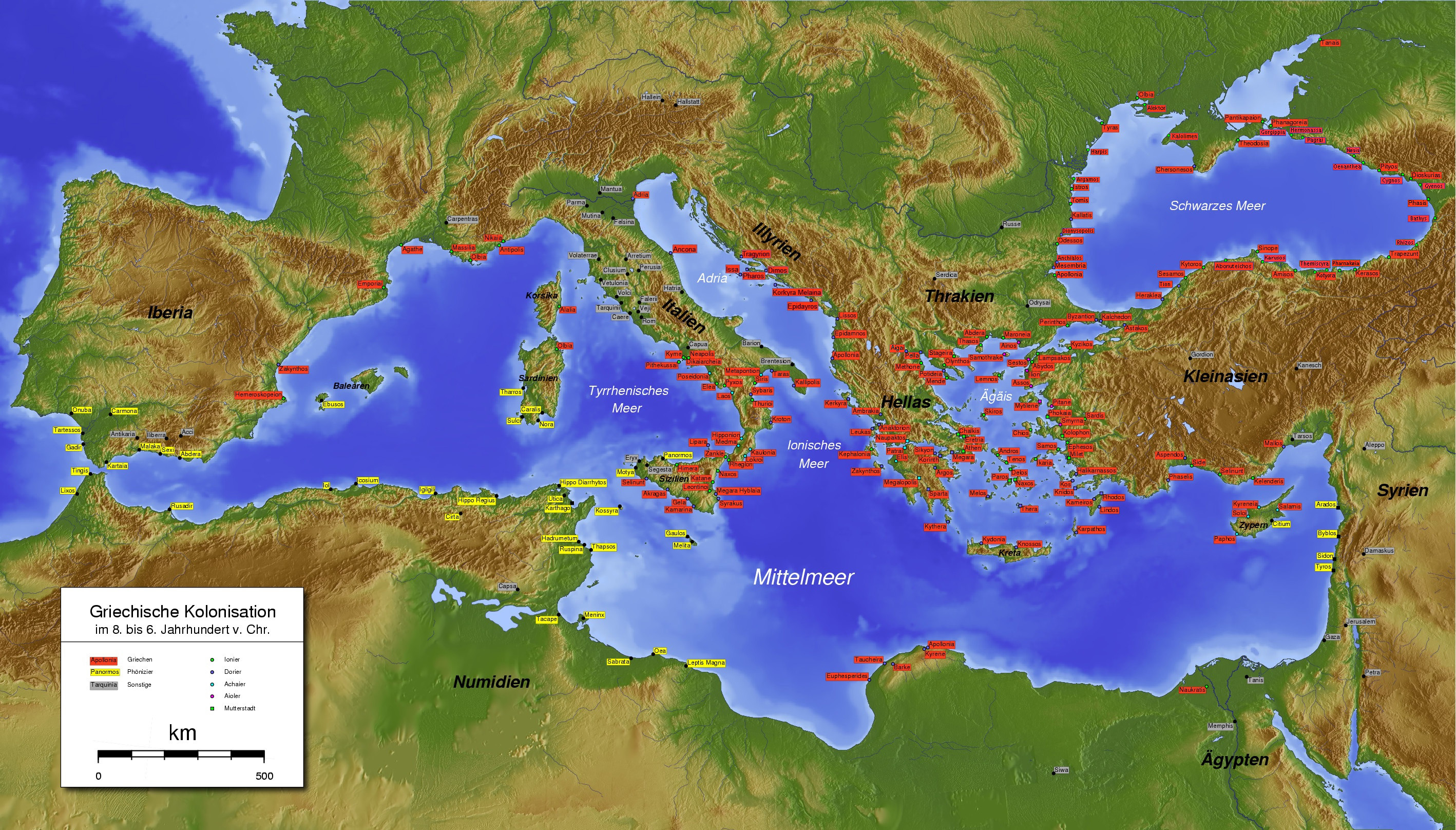
Phoenician and Greek colonies about 350 BC

The maximum extent of the Roman Empire under Trajan in 117 AD

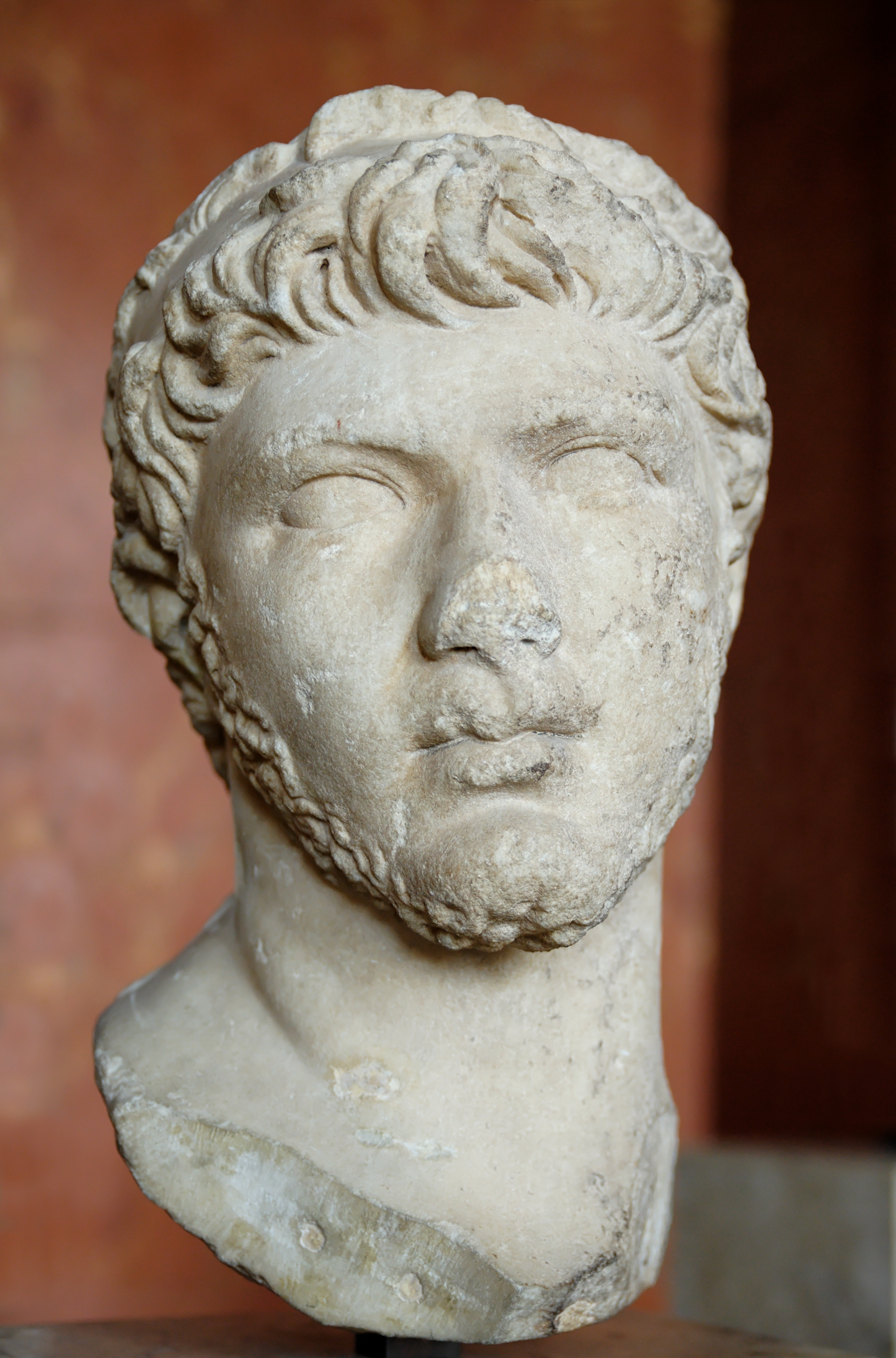
Bust of Ptolemy of Mauretania, c. 30–40 AD, grandson of the Ptolemaic Greek queen Cleopatra VII of Egypt. Louvre

The first recorded contacts between Greeks and Algerians were struggles in the 5th century BC between the Phoenicians, who had settled in what is now Tunisia and Algeria with their capital at Carthage, and the Greek colony of Syracuse in Sicily. The capital of Numidia, Cirta (later renamed Constantine) was founded in 203 BC with the help of Greek colonists. The Greek historian Polybius discusses the wars that led to Carthage and Numidia becoming the Roman provinces of Africa and Mauretania.

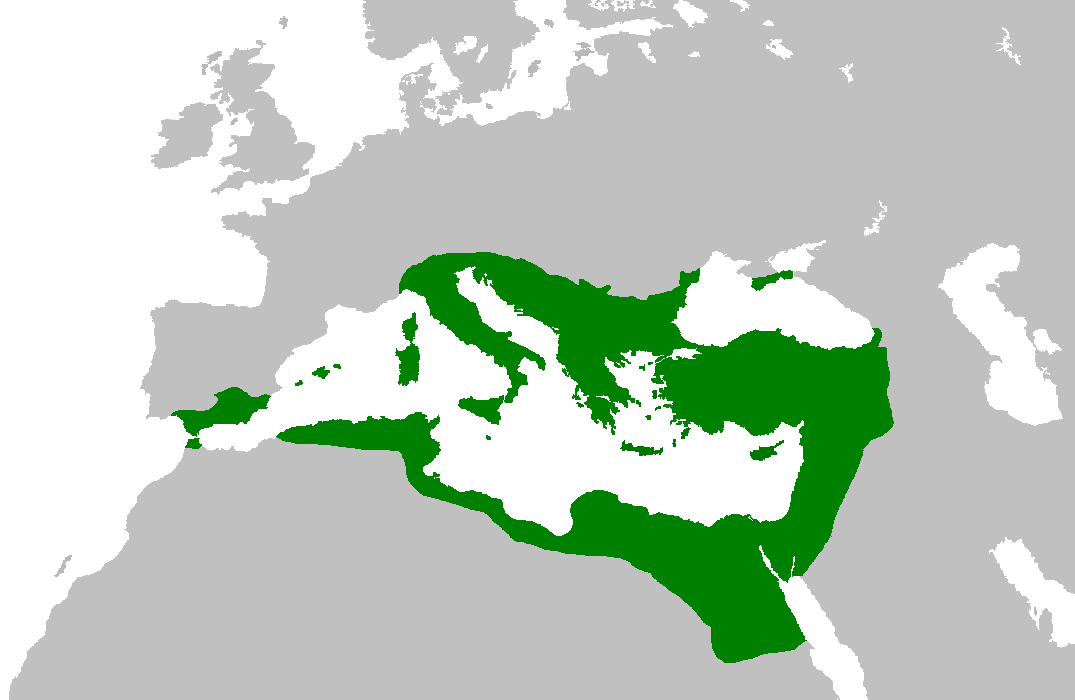
The Byzantine Empire during its greatest territorial extent under Justinian. c. 550.

After almost 600 years as part of the Roman Empire, the territory that is now Algeria was occupied by the Vandals in 428 AD. In 533–534, the Greek general Belisarius defeated the Vandals, and Africa became a province of the Byzantine Empire. In 535, the Greek emperor Justinian I made Sicily a Byzantine province.

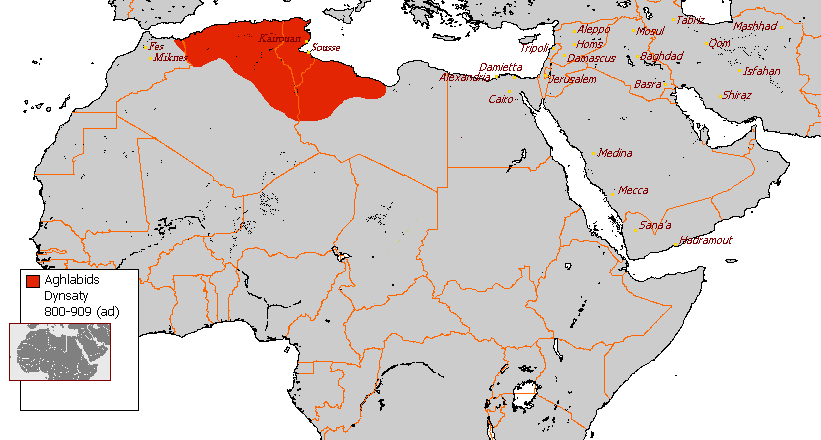
Ifriqiya at the beginning of the ninth century.

The Arab forces of Caliph Uthman invaded Sicily in 652, without success, although the Arabs managed to drive the Greeks out of North Africa between 670 and 711 AD. A serious assault on Sicily was launched in 740 from Carthage, where the Arabs had built shipyards and a permanent base from which to make more sustained attacks, again without success. In 826, Ziyadat Allah the Emir of Ifriqiya sent an army that conquered the southern shore of the island and laid siege to Syracuse, but was forced to abandon the attempt due to plague. In 831 Berber units captured Palermo after a year-long siege. Palermo became the Muslim capital of Sicily, renamed al-Madinah. Taormina fell in 902, but the Greeks clung onto territory in the island until 965.

In 1061, after a successful campaign against the Byzantines in the south of Italy, the Norman Robert Guiscard invaded the Emirate of Sicily and captured Messina. After a prolonged campaign, the Normans completed the conquest of Sicily by 1091. The Norman Kingdom of Sicily developed a vibrant culture, and became a gateway that opened the world of Greek philosophy and Muslim science to Western Europe. (Later the Normans went on to sack and occupy Constantinople itself in 1204 during the Fourth Crusade).

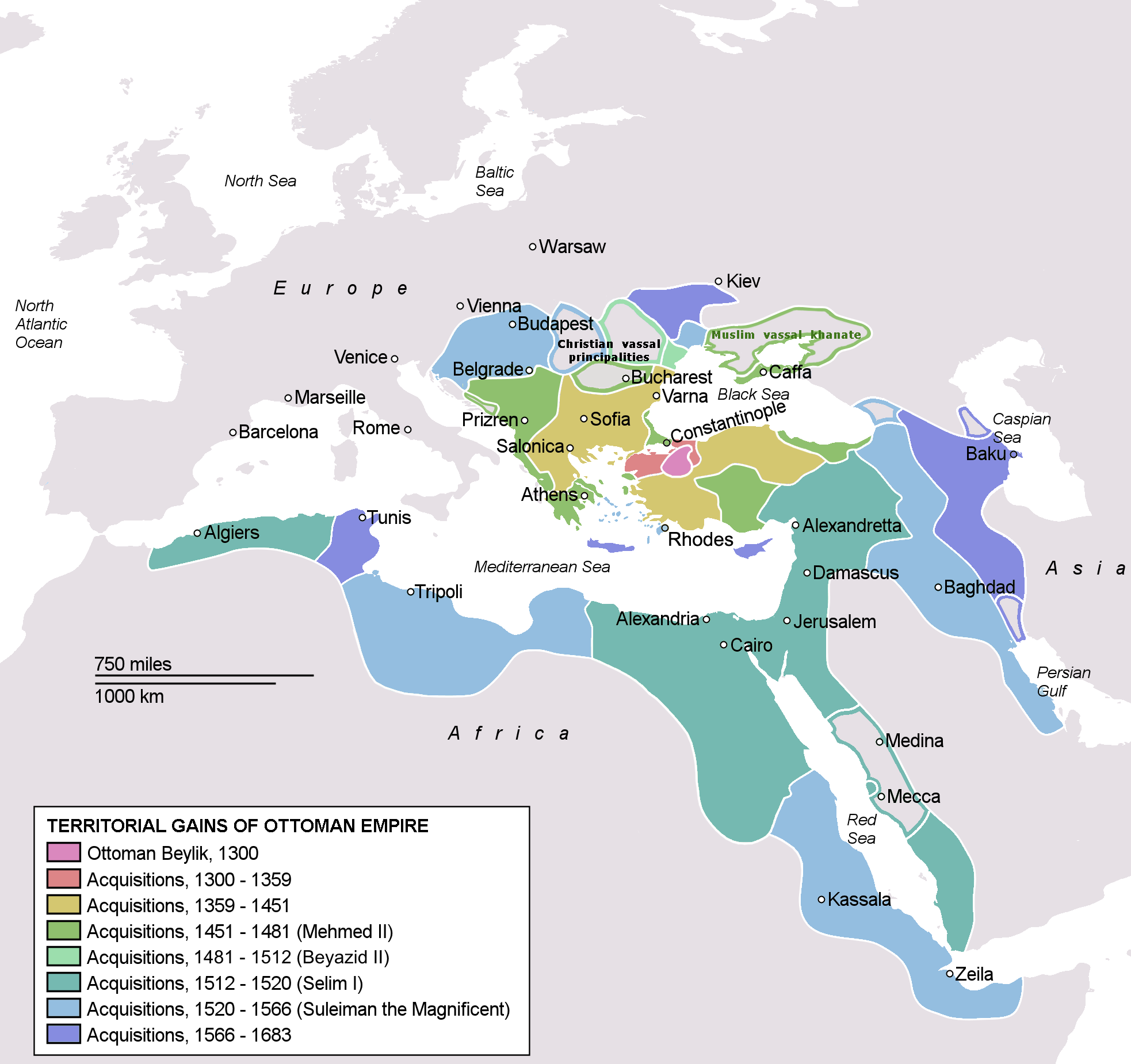
Ottoman Empire at its greatest extent

After the fall of Constantinople to the Turks in 1453, most of Greece was subject to the Ottoman Empire until its declaration of independence in 1821. Algeria also became a province of the Ottoman Empire in 1517, captured by the half-Turkish Oruç Reis, who established the Barbary Corsairs. Algeria remained nominally subject to the Ottoman Empire until the French invasion of Algeria in 1830, but in practice was largely independent. The Barbary Corsairs, based in Algiers and other ports of the Barbary coast, were a severe threat to Mediterranean trade until their suppression in the early 19th century. Greek and Barbary pirates had close relations, with many Greeks sailing on Barbary ships.

A substantial proportion of the Greek speaking inhabitants of Cargèse emigrated to Sidi Merouane in Algeria between 1874 and 1876. Of the total population of 1078 in 1872, it is estimated that 235 emigrated, all of them Greek speakers. According to anecdotal evidence from some Greeks in France and Corsican Greek descendents living in Greece, most of the Greek inhabitants of Sidi Merouane who survived the Algerian War of Independence resettled in Southern France following Algeria's independence from France in 1962, having largely assimilated with other French and European Pied-Noir settlers in Algeria, although a small number are known to have settled in Greece or emigrated to the United States.

Greece was among the first countries to establish diplomatic relations with Algeria after its independence in 1962, by upgrading the then Greek Consulate General in Algiers to an embassy in 1963.

== Official relations ==
=== Diplomatic contacts ===
The two Mediterranean countries have frequent high-level diplomatic contacts. In 1994, Algerian Foreign Minister Mohammed Salah Dembri visited Athens where he met his counterpart Karolos Papoulias and was received by Prime Minister Andreas Papandreou. They discussed bilateral relations and specifically discussed the Cyprus and Skopje issues. The Algerian Minister of Foreign Affairs visited Greece in February 2001, returning a previous visit paid by the Foreign Minister of Greece to Algeria. In July 2002, Greek Minister of Development Akis Tsochatzopoulos and Algerian Energy Minister Chakib Khelil met to examine new ways of cooperation. In 2003, Greek [National] Defence Minister Ioannos Papandoniou visited Algeria to discuss ways to consolidate military cooperation between Algeria and Greece. In March 2008, the Greek Foreign Minister Dora Bakoyannis visited Algiers where she met with Algeria's President Abdelaziz Bouteflika and agreed to boost bilateral economic cooperation. In a message to Greek president Karolos Papoulias, Bouteflika said he wished to develop and deepen relationships between the two countries and to consult over issues related to security in the Mediterranean region.

=== Bilateral agreements ===
As of 2009, the two countries had in place 3 bilateral agreements:

- Agreement on Economic, Scientific and Technical Cooperation (1982)
- Agreement on Educational Cooperation (1988)
- Agreement on Mutual Protection and Promotion of Investments (2000)

== Economic relations ==
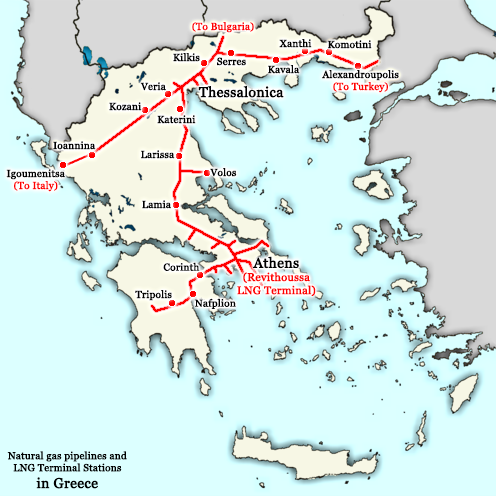
Natural gas pipelines in Greece. Revithoussa is near the southeast intersection.

Since 2000, Algeria has supplied Greece with natural gas under a long-term agreement between the two countries. The liquefied natural gas is transported by special vessels to the Revithoussa LNG Terminal to the west of Athens. The exports of Algerian products to Greece amounted to $89 million in 2001, including mainly oil and oil derivatives, natural gas, inorganic chemicals, iron and steel. In the same year, Greek exports to Algeria amounted to $50.78 million, consisting mainly of cereals and related derivatives, tobacco products, pharmaceuticals, medical and non-ferrous minerals. By 2006, total trade volumes had risen to US$410.2 million. In 2007, Algeria was ranked 6th among Greece's Arab trade partners.

In 2008, a high-ranking delegation of Algerian government and business officials from sectors such as ports management, construction, public works, banking and finance as well as energy, and around 60 Greek delegates held a forum on Greek-Algerian economic cooperation in Athens.

== Migration ==
As Spain and Italy are taking increasingly tough measures to restrict illegal migrants from the Middle East and Africa, growing numbers are entering the EU through Greece. In 2007, Greece arrested 112,000 illegal immigrants, up from 40,000 in 2005. The influx of illegal migrants is causing rising violence in Athens. Newly arrived refugees from conflict zones in the Middle East and Africa are being exploited by established gangs of Nigerians, Moroccans and Algerians, who engaged in street battles in downtown Athens in 2008.(subscription required) In May 2009, 500 illegal immigrants in Athens, mostly from Algeria and Tunisia, were besieged by a crowd of Neo-Nazi Greeks inside an abandoned eight floor building with no water and electricity. Earlier in the year, Turkish police arrested a group of 120 Algerian illegal immigrants who were trying to cross the border into Greece. The Turkish town of Adana has become a popular transit point for Algerian illegal immigrants.

Algeria is also a staging post for trade in migrants from Sub-Saharan Africa. The U.S. Department of State describes Algeria as a transit country for men and women trafficked from Sub-Saharan Africa to Europe for the purposes of commercial sexual exploitation and forced labor.

== See also ==
- Foreign relations of Algeria
- Foreign relations of Greece

== Sources ==
- Nicholas, Nick (2005), "A history of the Greek colony of Corsica", Journal of the Hellenic Diaspora, 31 (1), New York: 33–78.
- Stephanopoli de Comnène, Michel (2002), Histoire des Grecs–Maniotes en Corse: III. Cargèse 1776-1894 (in French), Athens: Études Laconiennes, ISBN 978-960-86254-3-3.
