= DESFA =

Greek natural gas transmission system operator

- Company type: subsidiary
- Industry: Oil and gas
- Founded: 30 March 2007
- Headquarters: Chalandri, Athens, Greece
- Key people: Maria Rita Galli (CEO)
- Products: Gas
- Services: Natural Gas Transmission
- Revenue: ▲€268.69 million (2017)
- Operating income: ▲€125.94 million (2017)
- Net income: ▲€85.63 million (2017)
- Total assets: ▲€1.569 billion (2017)
- Total equity: ▲€921.77 million (2017)
- Owner: Senfluga S.A. (66%); Government of Greece (34%)
- Number of employees: 258 (2014)
- Website: www.desfa.gr

DESFA (National Natural Gas System Operator S.A.) is a natural gas transmission system operator in Greece. It was established on 30 March 2007 as a subsidiary of DEPA. In addition to the transmission system, the company also operates Greece's gas distribution networks, and the Revithoussa LNG Terminal.

On 11 June 2013, Azerbaijani oil company SOCAR won the tender for acquisition of a 66% stake of DESFA for €400 million. Following Greece's January 2015 legislative election, the offered share was reduced to 49%. The deal, which was expected to be concluded by August 2015, failed in November 2016 as the last offer by SOCAR was rejected. The HRADF issued a new tender on 1 March 2017 with updated conditions of eligibility, officially terminating the previous one.

On 20 December 2018, Senfluga S.A., a consortium formed by Snam (60%), Enagás (20%) and Fluxys (20%), completed the acquisition of a 66% stake in DESFA for an amount of €535 million.

In April 2025, DESFA and North Macedonia’s state-owned gas operator NOMAGAS signed a Memorandum of Understanding related to the Greece–North Macedonia Interconnector. The project involves the construction of a 123-kilometre high-pressure natural gas pipeline, with 55 kilometres located in Greece and 68 kilometres in North Macedonia. The pipeline is intended to provide an additional supply route for natural gas and is designed to accommodate future hydrogen transport. It is scheduled for commissioning in the first half of 2026

== Infrastructure development ==
In February 2023, DESFA published its Ten-Year Development Plan (2023–2032), outlining investments of approximately €1.27 billion. The plan includes infrastructure projects such as a 215-kilometer duplication of the YP Karperi–Komotini pipeline branch, designed to be compatible with hydrogen transport, along with increasing transmission capacity and support gas flows toward Southeast and Central Europe.

== Shareholders ==
As of January 2019:

- Senfluga S.A. (a consortium formed by Snam (60%), Enagás (20%) and Fluxys (20%)): 66%
- Government of Greece: 33%

As of January 2020:

- Senfluga S.A. (a consortium formed by Snam (54%), Enagás (18%), Fluxys (18%), and DAMCO - a Greek energy company- (10%)): 66%
- Government of Greece: 33%

== See also ==
- Energy in Greece
- List of privatisations in Greece
