= Revythousa =

Island of Greece

Coordinates: 37°57′41″N 23°24′05″E

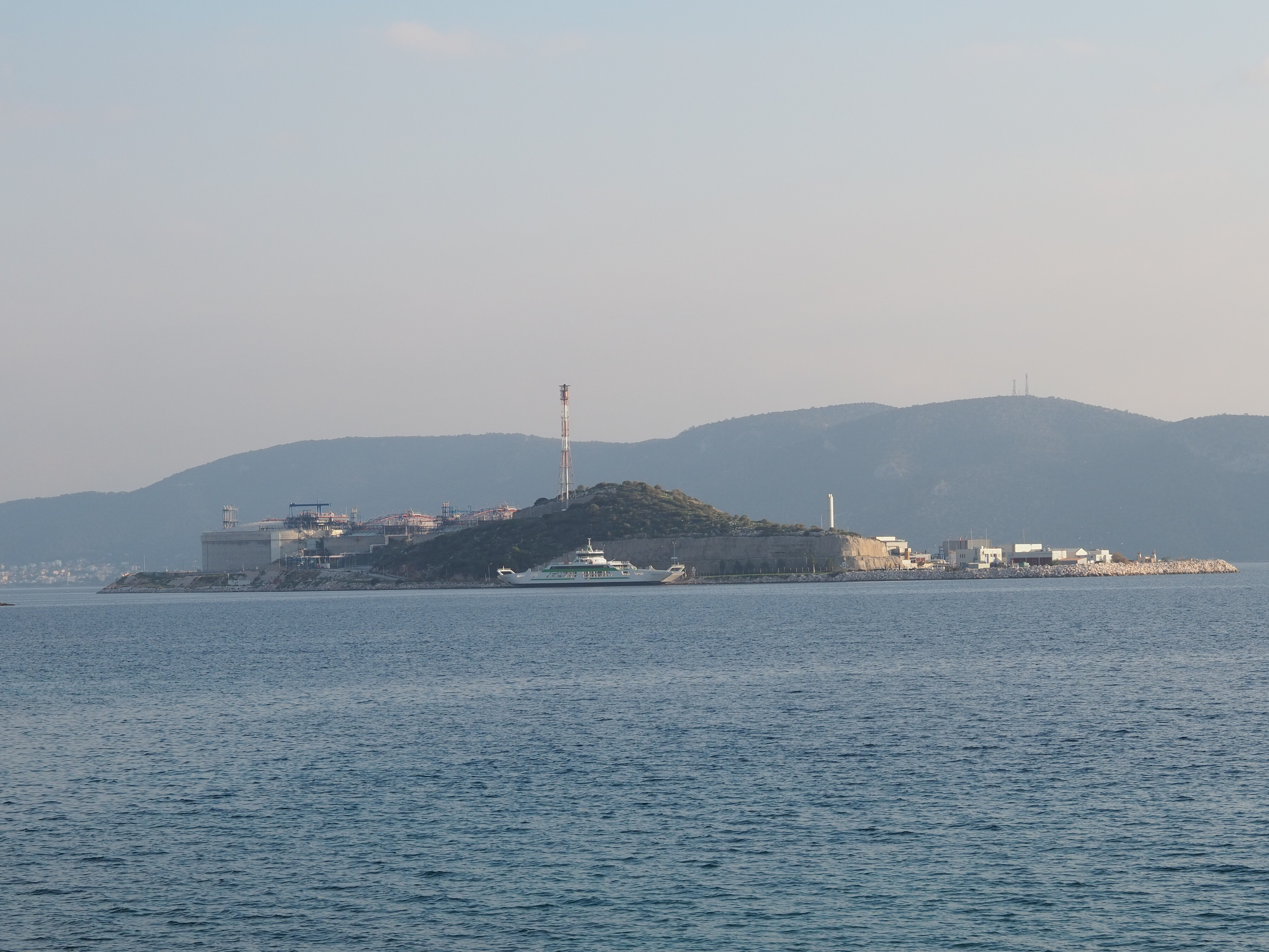

Revythousa (Greek: Ρεβυθούσα) is a small, uninhabited island in the Saronic Gulf, with an area of 0.18 square kilometers. It is located 500 meters south of the coast of Agia Triada, in the bay of Pachi Megara and 900 meters west of Salamis. Revitousa administratively belongs to Salamis since 2001.

== Liquefied Natural Gas Terminal Station ==
Since 1999, Revythousa hosts one of the most important national infrastructures in Greece, the Revithoussa LNG Terminal.

It is one of the three sources of supply of the National Gas Transmission System and one of the ten similar stations operating today throughout the Mediterranean and Europe. There, cargoes of natural gas in liquid form are unloaded and received, arriving in the country by tankers. The liquefied natural gas is stored in two tanks with a total capacity of 130,000 cubic meters. Then, at the special facilities of the unit, it is converted into gas and powers the National Natural Gas System.

In October 2007, DESFA completed the upgrading work of the Revithousa Liquefied Natural Gas (LNG) Terminal, accomplishing one of the most important investments in the country's energy infrastructure. With this upgrade, the station will now be able to receive and process up to triple the amount of natural gas and provide the National Transmission System with 5.2-5.3 billion cubic meters per year. In particular, the project included the expansion of infrastructure and enhancing the equipment to increase the gasification capacity of the plant to 1,000 cubic meters of gas per hour, from 271 cubic meters per hour.
