= Winter wind =

Winter wind, winds of winter, or variation, may refer to:

- Winter Wind (classical music), Étude Op. 25, No. 11 by Chopin
- Winter Winds, 2002 album by Mickey Newbury
- "Winter Winds", 2009 single by Mumford & Sons
- "Winterwind", song off the 2010 LP Blood Under the Bridge by Bottomless Pit
- Die winterwind (poem), a poem by Sydney Vernon Petersen
- The Winds of Winter (novel), a novel in the A Song of Ice and Fire epic fantasy saga by George R.R. Martin
- The Winds of Winter (episode), a 2016 TV episode of epic fantasy TV series Game of Thrones
- Winterwind (ship), a U.S. fishing boat, see List of shipwrecks in 1981

== See also ==
- Wind (disambiguation)
- Winter (disambiguation)
- Winter wind-flower (Anemone blanda), a flower
- That Winter, the Wind Blows (TV series) 2013 South Korean romantic melodrama
- North wind (disambiguation)
