= OKTA =

Oil company in North Macedonia

- Founded: 1978; 48 years ago
- Headquarters: North Macedonia
- Website: www.okta-elpe.com/en/

OKTA was founded in 1978 and is a refinery in the Balkan area. OKTA is part of one of the biggest groups for the refining, distribution, and trade of crude oil, oil derivatives and petrochemicals – the Hellenic Petroleum group. Apart from its main activities, OKTA has developed its own retail network, which consists of 26 rebranded petrol stations.

== Pipeline ==
A pipeline linking the port of Thessaloniki with the OKTA oil refinery outside Skopje began full operations in July 2002. The pipeline, which took three years to build, will provide North Macedonia with a source of oil and, in the longer term, there are plans to export refined oil products to neighboring areas. The project was partly financed by the European Bank for Reconstruction and Development.

== Products ==
Oil derivatives produced at OKTA include:

- liquefied petroleum gas
- naphtha
- motor gasoline
- diesel fuel
- fuel oil

== Environmental ==
OKTA is the only company in North Macedonia which has complete physical, chemical and biological waste water treatment.
