= Hellenic Republic Asset Development Fund =

Greek government-owned company

Hellenic Republic Asset Development Fund S.A.
- Native name: Ταμείο Αξιοποίησης Ιδιωτικής Περιουσίας του Δημοσίου Α.Ε.
- Type: Anonymi Etairia
- Industry: Asset management
- Founded: 2011
- Defunct: December 31, 2024
- Headquarters: Athens, Greece
- Area served: Greece
- Key people: Stergios Pitsiorlas (chairman); Dimitris Politis (CEO)
- Revenue: ▲€9 billion (2021)
- Total assets: ▲€20 billion (2021)
- Owner: State of Greece (100%)
- Number of employees: 20,000 (2021)
- Website: www.hradf.com

The Hellenic Republic Asset Development Fund (HRADF; Greek: Ταμείο Αξιοποίησης Ιδιωτικής Περιουσίας του Δημοσίου, ΤΑΙΠΕΔ) was a Greek state-owned asset management company that controls a number of state owned enterprises. It is a direct subsidiary of the Hellenic Corporation of Assets and Participations. HRADF exploits the assets of Greece that have been assigned to it and manages the implementation of the privatization program in Greece, specifically, the implementation of the Asset Development Plan (ADP). Its successor is Growthfund since January 1, 2025.

== Portfolio ==
=== Infrastructure ===
- Public Power Corporation S.A. (government retains 34.12% owned by Greek government)
- Piraeus Port Authority (government retains 7.14%)
- Thessaloniki Port Authority (government retains 7.27%)
- Marinas of Hydra, Poros and Epidavros
- Marinas of Chios and Pylos
- Athens International Airport (government retains 25%; privatisation of 30% stake held by the Hellenic Republic Asset Development Fund is in progress)
- Schinias Olympic Rowing and Canoeing Centre
- Markopoulo Olympic Equestrian Centre
- Galatsi Olympic Hall
- South Kavala Natural Gas Storage

=== Corporate ===
- Hellenic Petroleum (35.5%)
- Hellenic Post
- Public Gas Corporation

=== Land development ===
- Boutique Hotels
- Kassandra Golf (Kassandra)
- Peace and Friendship Stadium

== Privatisations ==
- Egnatia Odos S.A., the operator of the A2 motorway
- TrainOSE
- ROSCO (railway maintenance company)
- Marinas of Alimos (concession of 40 years awarded to Ellaktor
- Ellinikon airport (see also Hellenikon Metropolitan Park)
- DEPA Infrastructure
- Modiano Market

== See also ==
- Growthfund
