= Pantelić =

Pantelić (Serbian Cyrillic: Пaнтeлић, pronounced [pǎntelitɕ, pantěliːtɕ]) is a Serbian surname, derived from the given name Pantelija, a variant of Greek Pantelis. It may refer to:

- Đorđe Pantelić (born 1999), Bosnian footballer
- Dragan Pantelić, former Yugoslavian international footballer
- Miodrag Pantelić, former Serbian international footballer
- Marko Pantelić, former Serbian international footballer
- Natasha Pantelić, British Labour politician and candidate in the 2021 Chesham and Amersham by-election
