= DEPA =

Public Gas Corporation of Greece

- Native name: ΔΕΠΑ ΕΜΠΟΡΙΑΣ Μ.Α.Ε.
- Romanized name: Dimósia Epicheírisi Aeríou (DEPA) Μ.A.E.
- Type: state-owned enterprise
- Industry: Natural gas
- Founded: 1988
- Headquarters: Irakleio, Athens, Greece
- Area served: Southeast Europe
- Key people: Antonios Diamataris (Chairman) Konstantinos Xifaras (CEO) (2019)
- Products: Natural gas
- Revenue: ▲€1.696 million (2021)
- Operating income: ▲€332 million (2021)
- Net income: ▲€262 million (2021)
- Total assets: ▼€1.069 billion (2021)
- Total equity: ▼€639 billion (2021)
Owner
Greek State (via HRADF)	(100%)
- Website: www.depa.gr

Public Gas Corporation of Greece Μ.A.E. (DEPA; Greek: Δημόσια Επιχείρηση Αερίου (ΔΕΠΑ) Μ.Α.Ε.) commonly known for its Greek abbreviation DEPA (Greek: ΔΕΠΑ, romanized: DEPA) is the natural gas supply company of Greece. The registered office of the company is based in Irakleio, Athens. It operates within the jurisdiction of the Ministry of Development. The chairman is Antonios Diamataris, and Konstantinos Xifaras is CEO. In 2005, in order to liberalise the natural gas market, DESFA was created as a fully owned subsidiary to transport natural gas within Greece. Since then, DEPA sells gas to large consumers and to the gas supply companies. Natural gas is imported by pipelines from Bulgaria and Turkey and by liquefied natural gas at the Revithoussa LNG Terminal.

In May 2018 it was announced to sell DEPA's subsidiaries in Thessaly and Thessaloniki to Italian company Eni. It was reported that DEPA would only keep the gas operations in Attica area.

In 2019, the privatization of DEPA was approved by the Greek Government, and the company was split into three separate entities: DEPA Infrastructure, DEPA International Projects and DEPA Commercial.

== Splitting and Privatisation ==
DEPA was split in 2019 into three separate entities:

- DEPA Infrastructure: Includes DEPA's shareholding in the management companies of the gas distribution networks in Greece, the fixed assets of the distribution networks, the fiber optic network owned by DEPA and the rights and obligations of DEPA in natural gas distribution networks (compressed or liquefied), in addition to its participation in international projects.
- DEPA International Projects: Includes DEPA's participations in international projects.
- DEPA Commercial: Mainly deals with the import and supply of natural gas and electricity, as well as possible rights and obligations of DEPA in international projects (e.g. quantity commitments in transnational pipelines).

The HRADF, which before the split owned 65% of DEPA shares (the remaining 35% belonging to Hellenic Petroleum), will proceed with the privatisation of only DEPA Infrastructure and DEPA Commercial (HRADF holds 65% of each company's shares, with 35% of the remaining shares in each company being held by Hellenic Petroleum). The only exception is DEPA International Projects, where the HRADF will transfer its 65% shareholding to the Greek State.

On 10 December 2021, Italgas signed the sale and purchase agreement for the acquisition of 100% of DEPA Infrastructure. The acquisition was completed in September 2022, for €733 million.

DEPA Commercial became wholly state-owned after HRADF acquired HELLENiQ Energy's 35% shareholding and became the company's sole shareholder. In 2024, DEPA Commercial secured €390 million in European Investment Bank financing for photovoltaic projects in Greece, which have a planned capacity of about 800 MW. The company also holds a 29% stake in the 840 MW Alexandroupolis combined-cycle power project, whose construction began in 2023 and a 35% stake in Larissa Thermoelectric, which is developing a 792 MW natural gas fired power plant.

== Subsidiaries ==
As of 31 December 2019

- ΕDA Attikis A.E. (51%)
- EDA Thess A.E. (51%)

== See also ==
- Energy in Greece
