= Modiano Market =

Coordinates: 40.6349°N 22.9418°E

- Αγορά Μοδιάνο
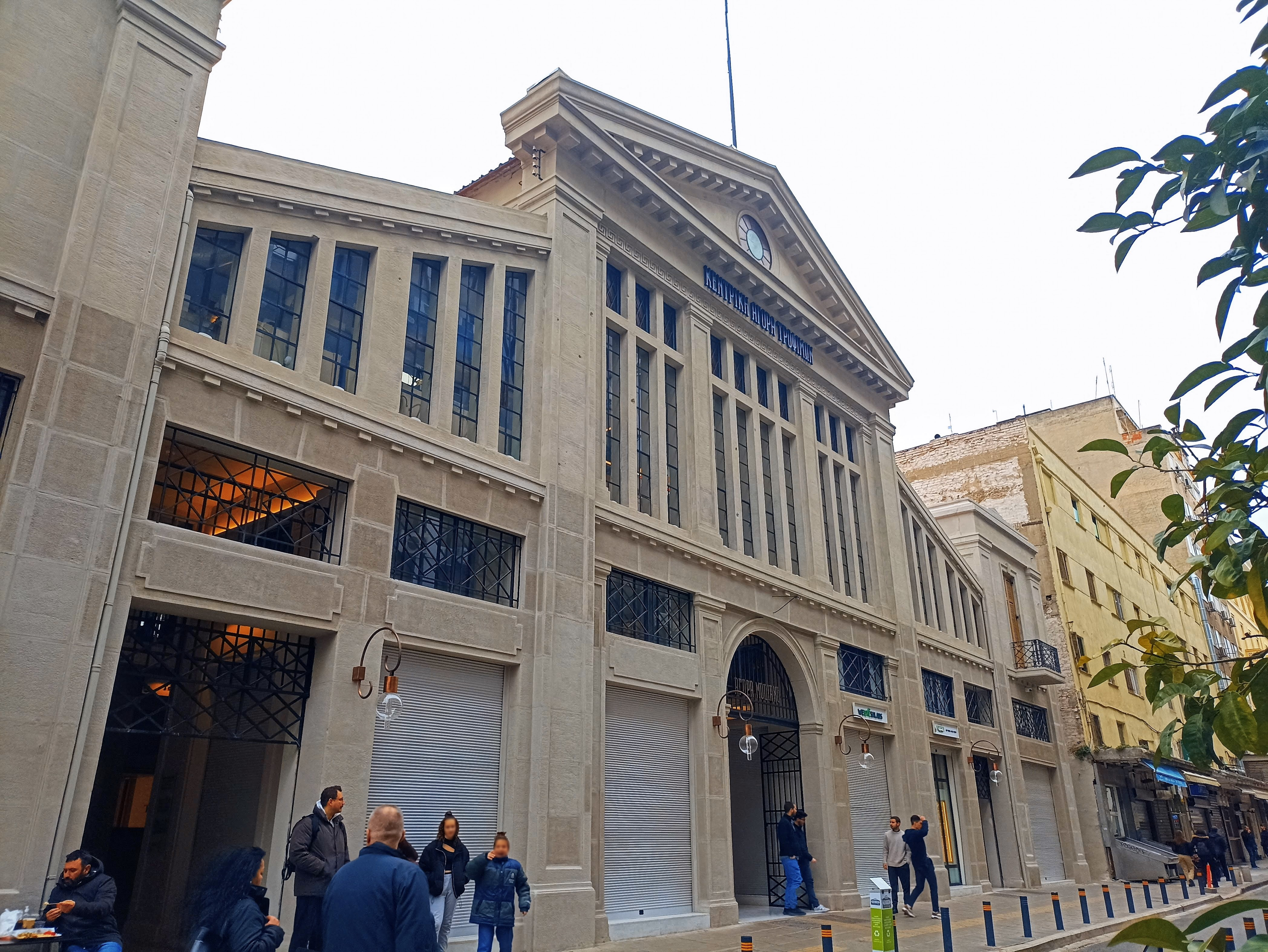
- Interactive map of the Modiano Market area
- Alternative names: Stoa Modiano

General information
- Location: Thessaloniki, Greece
- Construction started: 1922
- Completed: 23 March 1925

Technical details
- Material: reinforced concrete, brick and mortar
- Size: 70.6 meters x 35.4 meters

Design and construction
- Architect: Eli Modiano

Modiano Market or Stoa Modiano (Greek: Στοά Μοδιάνο) is an enclosed market in Thessaloniki, Greece. It was built between 1922 and 1925, after the great fire, on the site of the old Talmud Tora synagogue.

It is in the center of the city and forms the central point of the city's market which encompasses over several blocks. It took its name from the architect Eli Modiano, a member of the well known Italo-Jewish Modiano family of the city, who owned the area and later the market. The architectural office of Modiano was also inside the building. Inside the stoa there are fish markets, butcher shops, tavernas and bars. It is a place of social meeting and historical significance for the city.

The building was restored and reopened on December 5, 2022, after being bought by the Hellenic Republic Asset Development Fund.

== Sources ==
- Modiano Market
- Η τελευταία σελίδα της στοάς Μοδιάνο
