= HelleniQ Energy =

Oil company in Southeast Europe

HELLENiQ ENERGY Holdings S.A.
- Native name: Ελληνικά Πετρέλαια Ανώνυμη Εταιρεία
- Romanized name: Elliniká Petrélaia Anónymi Etairía
- Type: Public (anonymi etairia)
- Traded as: Athex: ELPE
- Industry: Energy industry
- Founded: 1958 as Public Petroleum Corporation
- Headquarters: Athens, Greece
- Area served: Southeastern Europe
- Key people: Andreas Shiamishis (CEO); Spilios Livanos (Chairman)
- Products: Oil and Gas Exploration; Natural gas trading and transportation; Oil refining; Petrochemicals; Electricity generation
- Services: Fuel stations; planes; ships
- Revenue: ▼€11.615 billion (2025)
- Operating income: ▼€394.8 million (2025)
- Net income: ▲€173 million (2025)
- Total assets: ▲€8.5 billion (2025)
- Total equity: ▼€2.7 billion (2025)
- Owner: POIH (Cyprus) Limited (40.41%); Hellenic Corporation of Assets and Participations (31.18%); Free float (28.41%)
- Number of employees: 4,912 (2025)
- Subsidiaries: EKO ABEE, enerwave
- Website: Official website
- Footnotes in a consolidated basis

HELLENiQ ENERGY Holdings S.A., formerly known as Hellenic Petroleum S.A. (Greek: Ελληνικά Πετρέλαια Ανώνυμη Εταιρεία, romanized: Elliniká Petrélaia Anónymi Etairía), is one of the largest oil companies in Southeast Europe and with its roots dating to 1958 with the establishment of the first oil refinery in Aspropyrgos, Greece.

It adopted the Hellenic Petroleum S.A. name in 1998, changing from Public Petroleum Corporation S.A. (Greek: Δημόσια Επιχείρηση Πετρελαίου Α.Ε., romanized: Dimósia Epicheírisi Petrelaíou A.E.; DEP) as the result of a corporate reorganization. It is a consortium of 6 subsidiaries and a number of additional companies of which it has varying degrees of management control. In September 2022, it changed its name to HELLENiQ ENERGY Holdings.

== Activities ==
=== Refineries and gas stations ===
Hellenic Petroleum operates three refineries in Greece, in Thessaloniki, Elefsina and Aspropyrgos, which account for 57% of the refining capacity of the country (the remaining 43% belongs to Motor Oil Hellas). The company also owns OKTA facilities in Skopje, Republic of North Macedonia for transportation and marketing of petroleum products. Crude oil for the refineries is supplied from Saudi Arabia, Iraq, Iran and Libya. Helleniq owns the 213 kilometers long Thessaloniki–Skopje pipeline, which resumed operations at the beginning of 2026 after a 13-year suspension. As of 2026, the company operated 1,475 service stations in Greece and 340 stations in Cyprus, Serbia, Bulgaria, Montenegro and North Macedonia. In December 2025, Helleniq and BP renewed their partnership to let Helleniq use the BP brand in Greece until 2035. It also has a network which sells LPG, jet fuel, naval fuels and lubricants.

=== Petrochemicals ===
Hellenic Petroleum is a major producer of petrochemicals in Greece, with a share of over 50% in the market. Their basic products are plastics, PVC and polypropylene, aliphatic solvents and inorganic chemicals, such as chlorine and sodium hydroxide. The petrochemicals department is a part of the Thessaloniki refinery.

=== Electricity ===
Hellenic Petroleum operates a 390 MW natural gas power station in Thessaloniki. It opened in 2005 and it is operated through a subsidiary, T-Power. The fixed investment for this plant amounted to 250 million Euros. In July 2025, Helleniq took full control over joint venture Elpedison, which the company operated together with Edison.

==== Renewable energy ====
In 2025, Helleniq acquired ABO Energy Hellas, including solar, wind and battery projects with a total capacity of 1.5 GW. During 2025, it also expanded its renewable energy portfolio in Romania and entered the Bulgarian market through acquisitions of ready-to-build projects with capacities of 405 MW. In March 2026, the company began operation of its first two solar parks in Romania with a combined capacity of 58 MW.

=== Oil exploration ===
The Group has established partnerships with leading companies in the sector, been awarded exploration and production rights for hydrocarbons in a portfolio of areas in Western Greece, both offshore and onshore in various development steps.

=== Other ===
Hellenic Petroleum subsidiaries include the engineering company Asprofos and the polypropylene film production company, DIAXON, whose factory is situated in the industrial area of Komotini. The company also controls two shipping companies and held a 35% stake in DEPA until 2025. It also has shares in VPI, which produces PET resin. Since 2002 Hellenic petroleum owns 54.53% of shares in Jugopetrol AD.

== Ownership ==
As of December 31, 2025, Paneuropean Oil and Industrial Holdings (Cyprus) Limited owned 40.41% of Helleniq, the Hellenic Corporation of Assets and Participations held 31.18%, while the remaining 28.41% were freely traded.

The chairman of the board of directors is Spilios Livanos and the chief executive officer of the company is Andreas Shiamishis.

== Impact of Russia's 2022 invasion of Ukraine on crude oil supplies ==
In the second half of 2021, Russian crude oil accounted for approximately 15–17% of the total crude feed of Hellenic Petroleum’s refineries. Following Russia’s 2022 invasion of Ukraine, Hellenic Petroleum sought alternative suppliers, including Saudi Arabia. While the company’s 2022 annual report stated that imports of Russian crude oil ceased at the end of February 2022, reports in the aftermath of the invasion, including a list of Yale School of Management, cited the company’s reliance on Russian crude oil. In March 2023, NaftoRynok reported, citing a letter from the company’s refining subsidiary, Hellenic Petroleum R.S.S.O.P.P., that the subsidiary stopped receiving Russian-origin crude oil, feedstocks, and petroleum products from March 2022.

== See also ==
- Energy in Greece
- OKTA
- Aspropyrgos Refinery
