= Sinking of the Masada =

1981 maritime disaster

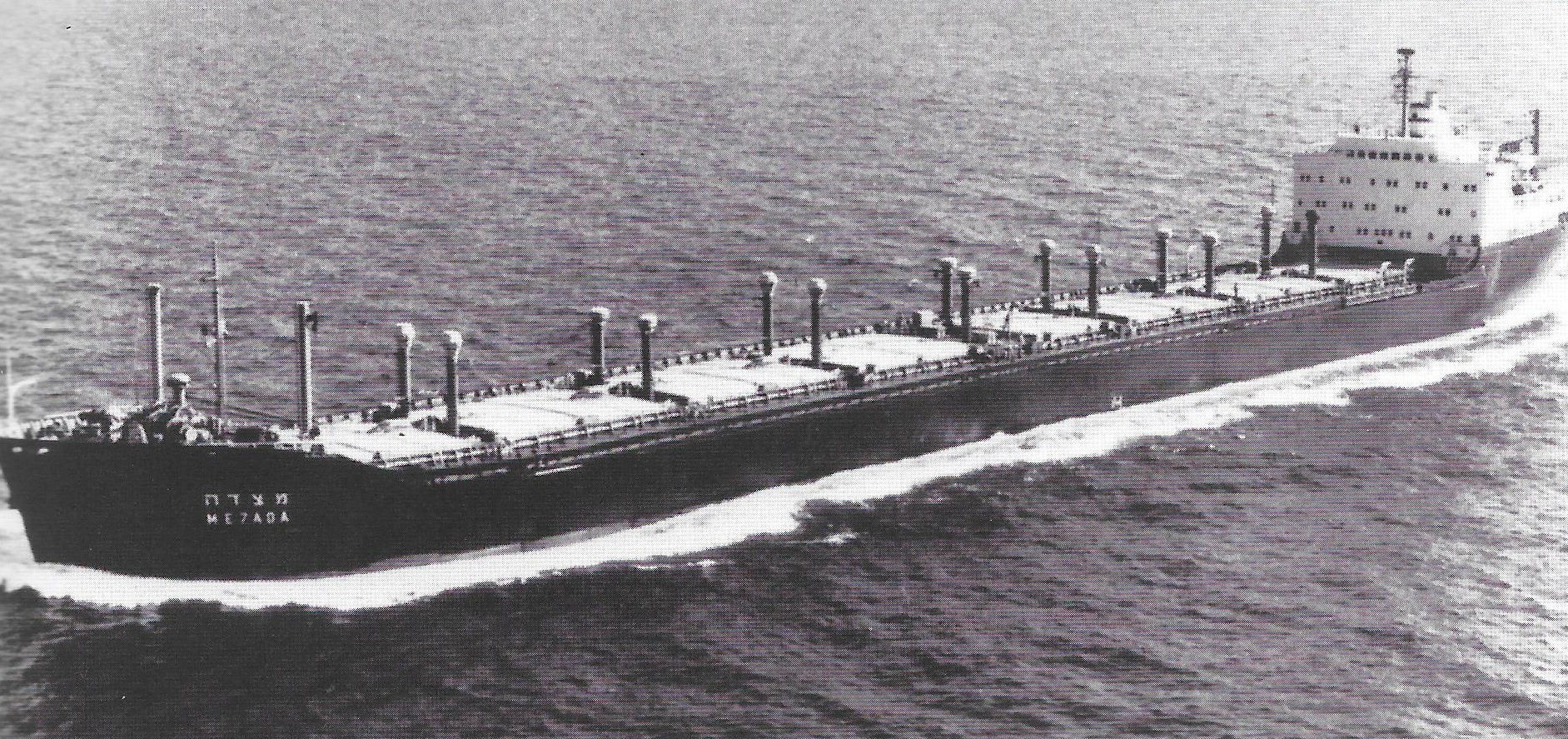
- Masada in 1980
- Date: March 8, 1981; 45 years ago
- Location: Atlantic Ocean
- Type: Maritime disaster
- Deaths: 24

The Masada sank in the Atlantic Ocean on March 8, 1981. The sinking resulted in the deaths of 24 crew.
