= Cofides =

- Native name: Compañía Española de Financiación del Desarrollo
- Industry: Asset management
- Founded: 1988
- Headquarters: Madrid, Spain
- Key people: José Luis Curbelo Ranero (President)
- Revenue: ▲€45.5 million (2023)
- Total assets: ▲$6.04 billion (2025)
- Owner: Spanish government (ca. 50%)
- Number of employees: 99 (2023)
- Website: www.cofides.es

The Compañía Española de Financiación del Desarrollo (COFIDES) (English: Spanish Development Finance Company), better known by its acronym Cofides, is a Spanish public company that provides financial support for investments by Spanish companies abroad. This financial support is provided from its own funds and from public funds from the Spanish government. Like France's Bpifrance and Italy's Cassa Depositi e Prestiti, it is also considered a sovereign wealth fund. It is a mixed capital company, majority-owned by the public sector, but in which some of Spain's largest banks and the Development Bank of Latin America and the Caribbean also have a stake. The company's headquarters are located at Paseo de la Castellana 278 in Madrid, in a building it shares with its main shareholder, ICEX España Exportación e Inversiones.

In 2025, assets under management (AUM) were estimated at $6.04 billion.

== History ==
The establishment of this company was approved by a ministerial council agreement on February 12, 1988, and formalized by public deed on December 29, 1988.

With the passing of Law 66/1997 of December 30 on fiscal, administrative, and social policy measures, it was entrusted with the administration of three public funds:

- the Guarantee Fund for the Financing of Foreign Investments,
- the Fund for Foreign Investments, and
- the Fund for Foreign Investments for Small and Medium-Sized Enterprises.

The latter two still exist today and are managed by Cofides.

The company manages two funds on behalf of the state, FIEX and FONPYME. COFIDES kept a low profile as a public investor until it recently established a joint venture with Oman's SGRF to invest in both Omani and Spanish companies. In doing so, it followed other European SDFs such as Russia's RDIF, France's Bpifrance, and Italy's CDP Equity.

In the following years, new funds were introduced, like a COVID-19 recovery fund in 2021. The most recent of these was the Social Impact Fund, established in June 2024.

Similarly, in recent years, the government has promoted the expansion of the number of private shareholders and integrated new shareholders, such as Banco Popular in December 2013 and the Development Bank of Latin America and the Caribbean the following year.

== Ownership ==
Cofides has a mixed ownership structure, meaning that its capital is divided between public and private institutions:

=== Public owners ===
- ICEX Spain Export and Investment: 25.74%.
- Official Credit Institute: 20.31%.
- ENISA: 7.63%.

=== Private owners ===
- Banco Santander: 20.17%.
- BBVA: 16.68% .
- Banco Sabadell: 8.33% .
- CAF – Development Bank of Latin America and the Caribbean: 1.14% .

== Memberships ==
Cofides is a member of the International Forum of Sovereign Wealth Funds (IFSWF) and has therefore also committed itself to the Santiago Principles for appropriate conduct and proper business practices.
