= Tater Du Lighthouse =

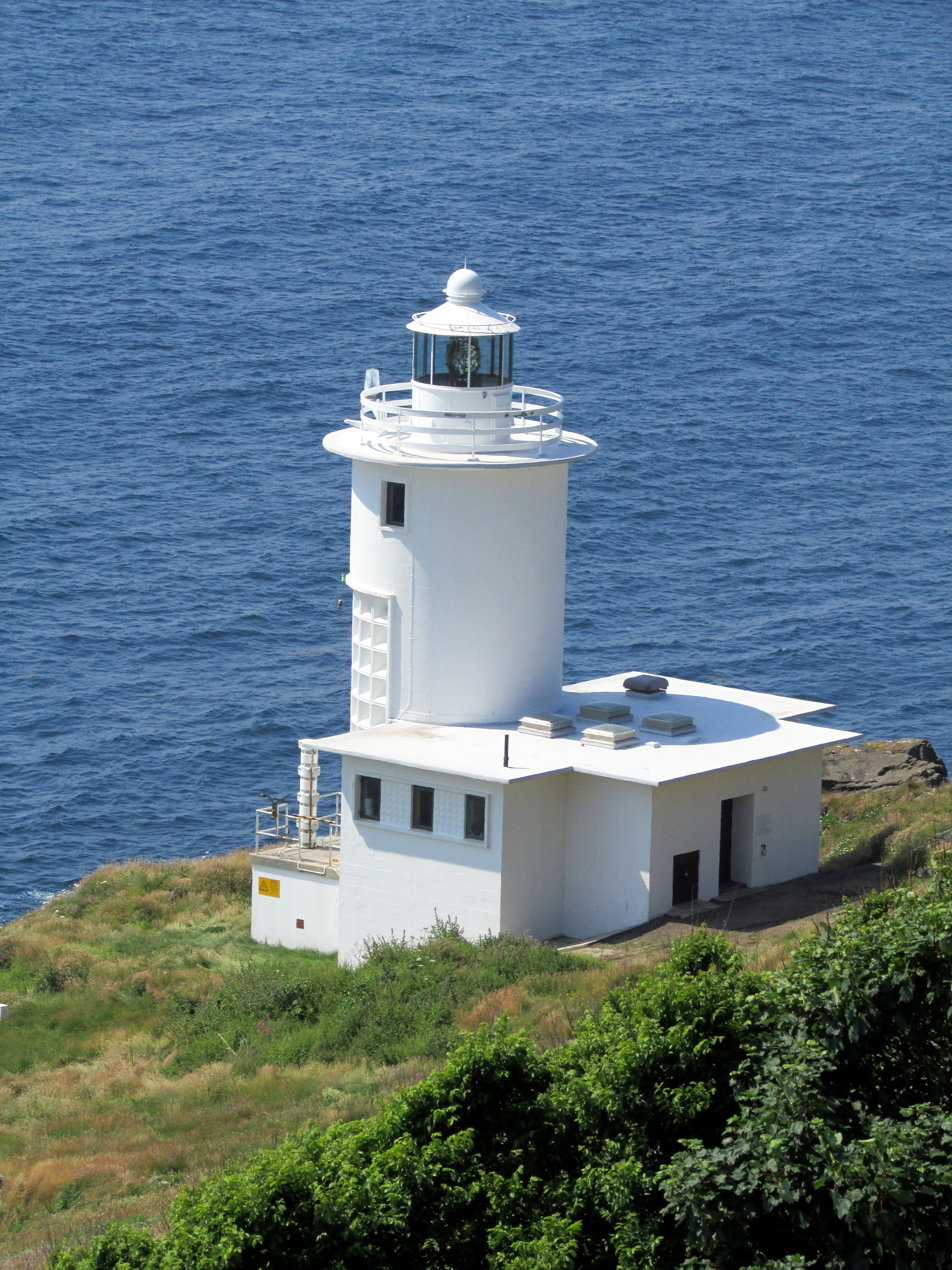
- Tater Du Lighthouse in 2013
- Location: Penzance; Cornwall; England
- Coordinates: 50.052394°N 5.577372°W

Tower
- Constructed: 1965
- Construction: concrete block tower
- Automated: 1965
- Height: 15 metres (49 ft)
- Shape: cylindrical tower with balcony and lantern
- Markings: white tower and lantern
- Operator: Trinity House

Light
- Focal height: 34 metres (112 ft)
- Lens: 4th Order 250Mm Rotating Catadioptric Optic (1965-2022)
- Light source: LED
- Intensity: 96,000 candela
- Range: 12 nautical miles (22 km; 14 mi)
- Characteristic: Fl (3) W 15s.

Tater Du Lighthouse is Cornwall's most recently built lighthouse. The construction of the lighthouse came out of the tragedy of losing a small Spanish coaster called the Juan Ferrer on 23 October 1963, on the nearby Boscawen Point, the vessel capsized with the loss of 11 lives. After the tragedy the Newlyn and Mousehole Fishermen's Association put pressure on Trinity House for a lighthouse to be built, stating that similar tragedies could happen again. The lighthouse, built with concrete blocks, was first lit in July 1965.

== Description ==
The short building is topped by a 7-foot 1 inch lantern with an electric light which is powered from batteries which are charged from mains electricity during the day. The light is 3 white lights flashed every 15 seconds, with a range of 20 nautical miles (37 km; 23 mi). There is a separate red fixed light that shows in the line over the Runnelstone Rock, shone from a lower window in the tower.

The lighthouse looks out over the Inner and Outer Bucks, two rocks that partially show at low water, and where in 1868 the SS Garonne was lost.

== History ==
Designed by Michael H. Crisp, the lighthouse was constructed with a completely automatic installation which was remotely controlled from the Trinity House depot in Penzance. In 1997 the lighthouse was modernised and it is now monitored from the Trinity House Planning Centre at Harwich.

In May 2022, as part of Trinity House's lighthouse modernisation programme, the revolving optic was replaced with static LED lanterns. At the same time the light's visible range was reduced from 20 nautical miles (37 km; 23 mi) to 12 nmi (22 km; 14 mi).

=== Fog signal ===
The fog signal was originally a series (72 in total) of Tannoy units built into the lighthouse tower; they were powered by an alternator coupled to a 2-cylinder Ruston diesel engine. This was later replaced by a short-range Pharos Marine Omnidirectional electric emitter sounding the same characteristic of two one second blasts every 30 seconds during fog. The fog signal was decommissioned in 2012.

== Surrounding area ==
The coastal slope and cliffs around the lighthouse are designated the Tater–du SSSI (a Site of Special Scientific Interest) notified in 1992 because ″... it provides unique evidence of the geological history of SW England during the Variscan orogeny, in particular because of the occurrence of pillow lavas.″ The cliffs are also a Geological Conservation Review site.

The nearby rocks (Inner and Outer Bucks) form a popular sub-aqua dive site. The nearest point for launching a dive-boat is Penzance, as Lamorna Cove just around the corner from The Bucks, does not allow launching from there.

== Gallery ==
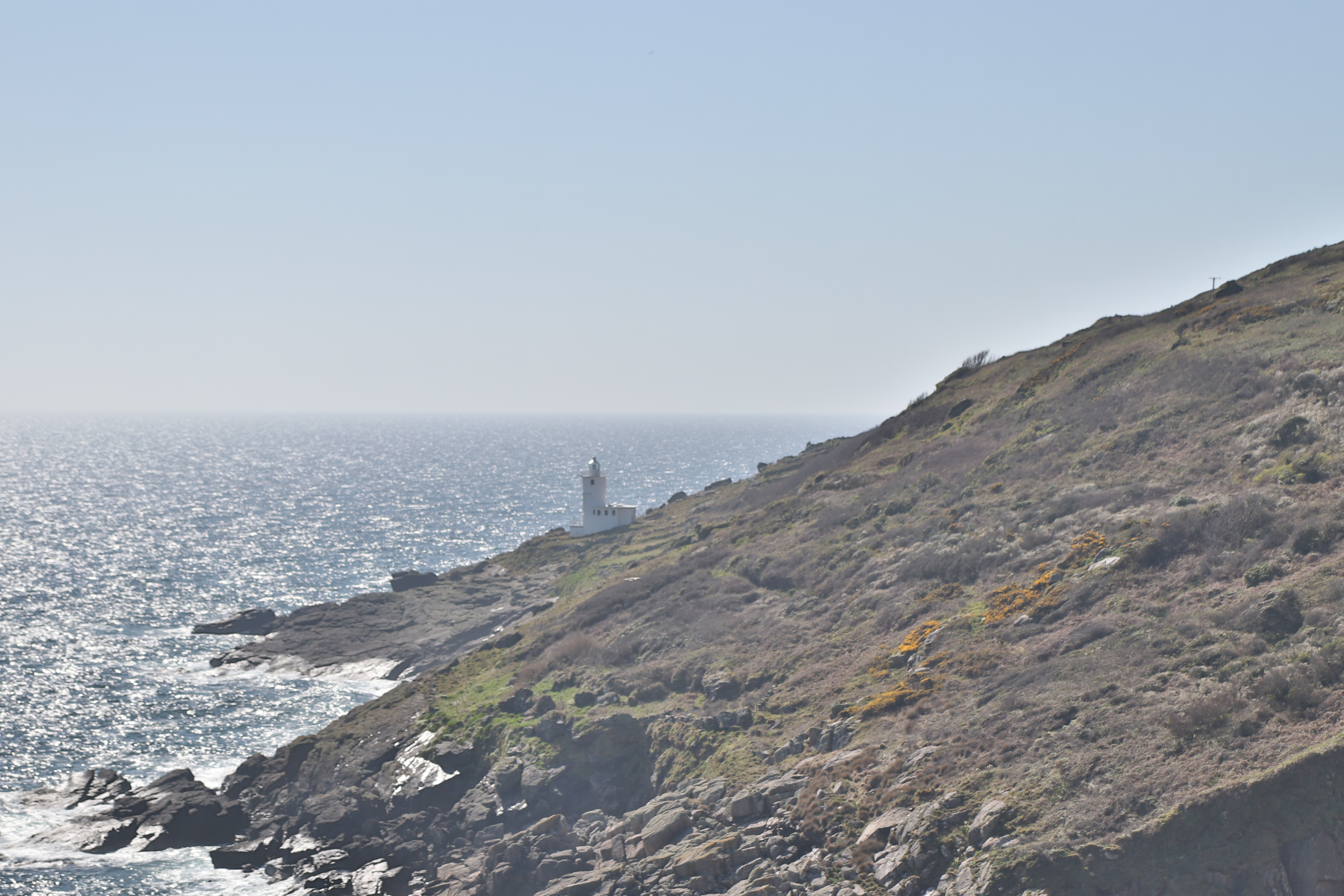
A distant view of Tater Du Lighthouse

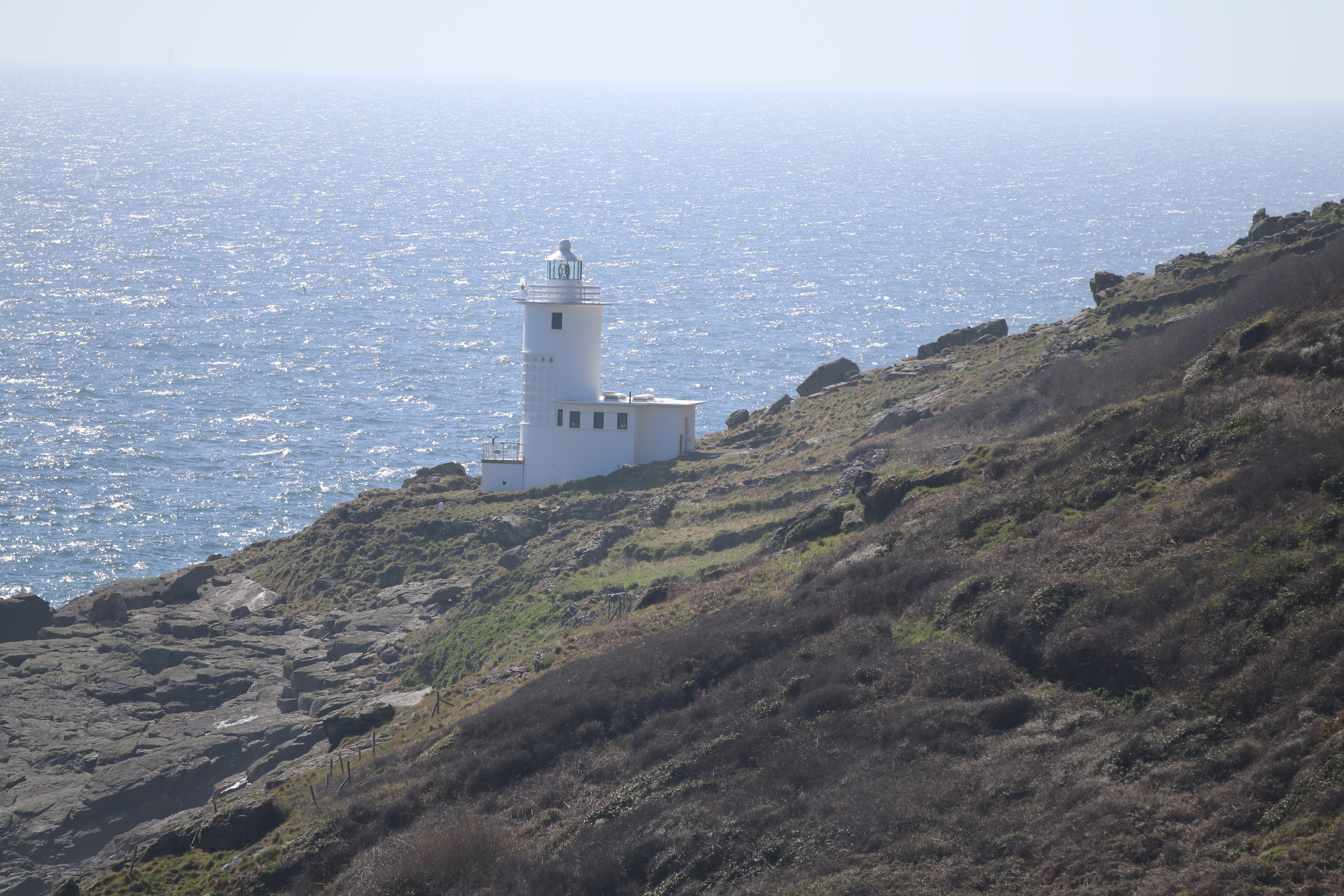
Tater Du Lighthouse

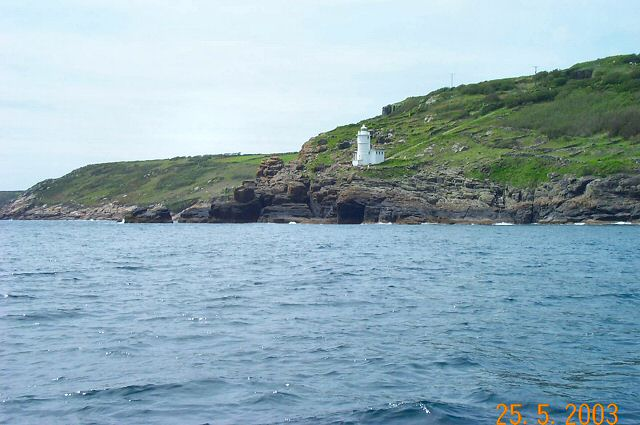
The coast at Tater Du

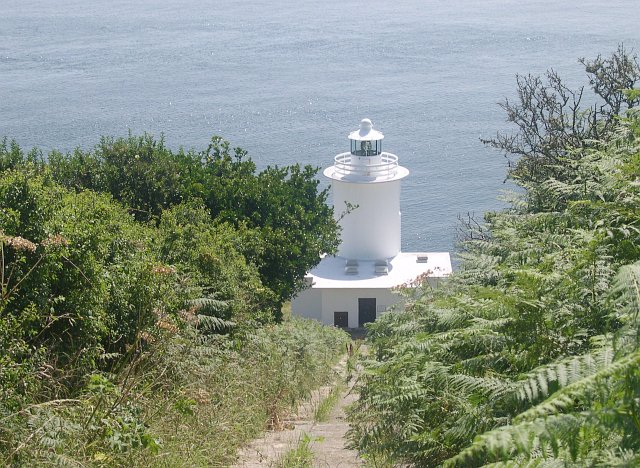
The steep access road down to the lighthouse

== See also ==
- List of lighthouses in England
