= MV Akra Aktion =

History
- Name: MV Akra Aktion
- Builder: T.van Duijvendijk´s Scheepswerf Lekkerkerk - Lekkerkerk, Netherlands
- Christened: Steven
- Completed: 1957
- Out of service: 19 February 1981
- Identification: IMO5340912
- Fate: Caught in a storm and stranded near Vama Veche Beach
- Status: Decommissioned or lost

General characteristics
- Type: General cargo ship
- Tonnage: 2,306 tons (gross)
- Length: 91.40 m
- Beam: 12.54 m
- Draught: 6.75 m
- Installed power: 1600 HP
- Capacity: 3,851 tons (deadweight)

The cargo ship MV Akra Aktion (prior name Steven) was built in 1957 in Amsterdam, the Netherlands. The cargo ship had sailed under a Greek flag and started its journey from Brăila with 3575.52 tons of steel laminate to Alexandria, Egypt. On 19 February 1981, the ship got into a storm and was stranded several hundred meters from Vama Veche beach. The water was only a few meters deep.

The crew was saved, but the ship was not salvageable. The cargo was recovered 20 years later. Now, due to the decay from rust and waves, only a small part of the wreck, including the bow, is sometimes visible over the water.

== Dimensions and Features ==
Akra Aktion is 91.40 meters long with a maximum breadth of 12.54 meters and a draught of 6.75 meters. She has a gross weight of 2,306 tons and a maximum carrying capacity of 3,851 deadweight tonnage. She is powered by a 1,600 CP engine.

== See also ==
- MV E Evangelia
