= Revithoussa LNG terminal =

Coordinates: 37.961172°N 23.401140°E

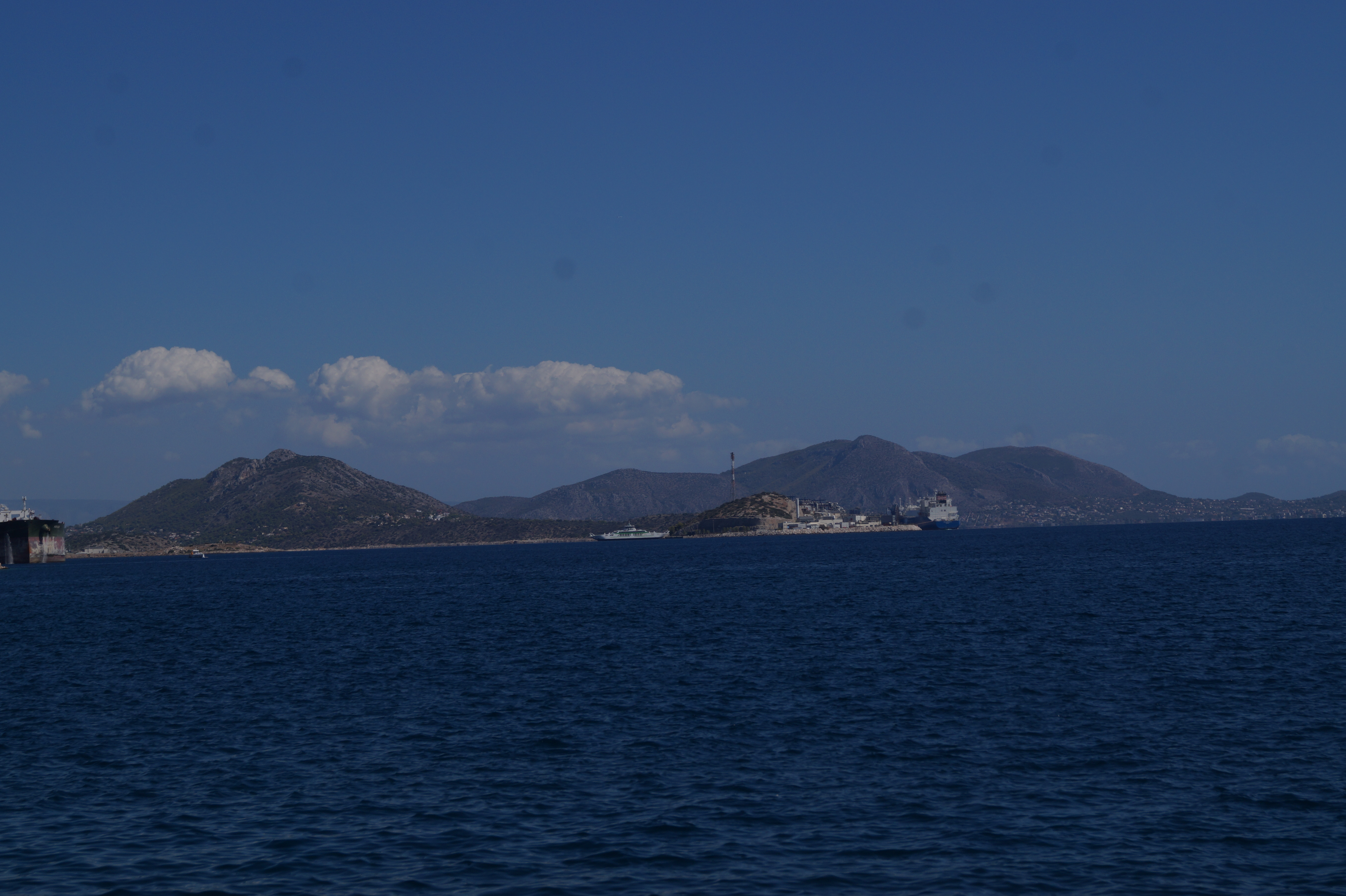
Revithoussa LNG terminal on the Island Revithoussa

The Revithoussa LNG Terminal is the only LNG terminal in Greece. It is located on the islet of Revithoussa (or Revithousa, or Revythousa), in the Gulf of Megara, west of Athens. It was completed in 1999 and is operated by DESFA SA, which is a fully owned subsidiary of DEPA. The gas is supplied under contract from Algeria's Sonatrach, of between 0.51 and 0.68 billion cubic meters annually until 2021. There is also a contract with Italy's Eni to supply gas, though not currently used.

== Capacity ==
In 2007, an expansion project was completed to upgrade the terminal, increasing its capacity to 185 Bcf/y (5.2-5.3 billion cubic meters annually). The LNG was stored in two in-ground tanks, with a total capacity of 130,000 cubic meters. In 2018, a third storage tank and electricity power plant (a High-efficiency Cogeneration Unit of 13MW capacity that ensures the electrical autonomy of the terminal) were added, increasing the total capacity up to 225,000 cubic meters.

== See also ==
- List of LNG terminals
- Energy in Greece
