= Port of Thessaloniki =

Coordinates: 40.636°N 22.922°E

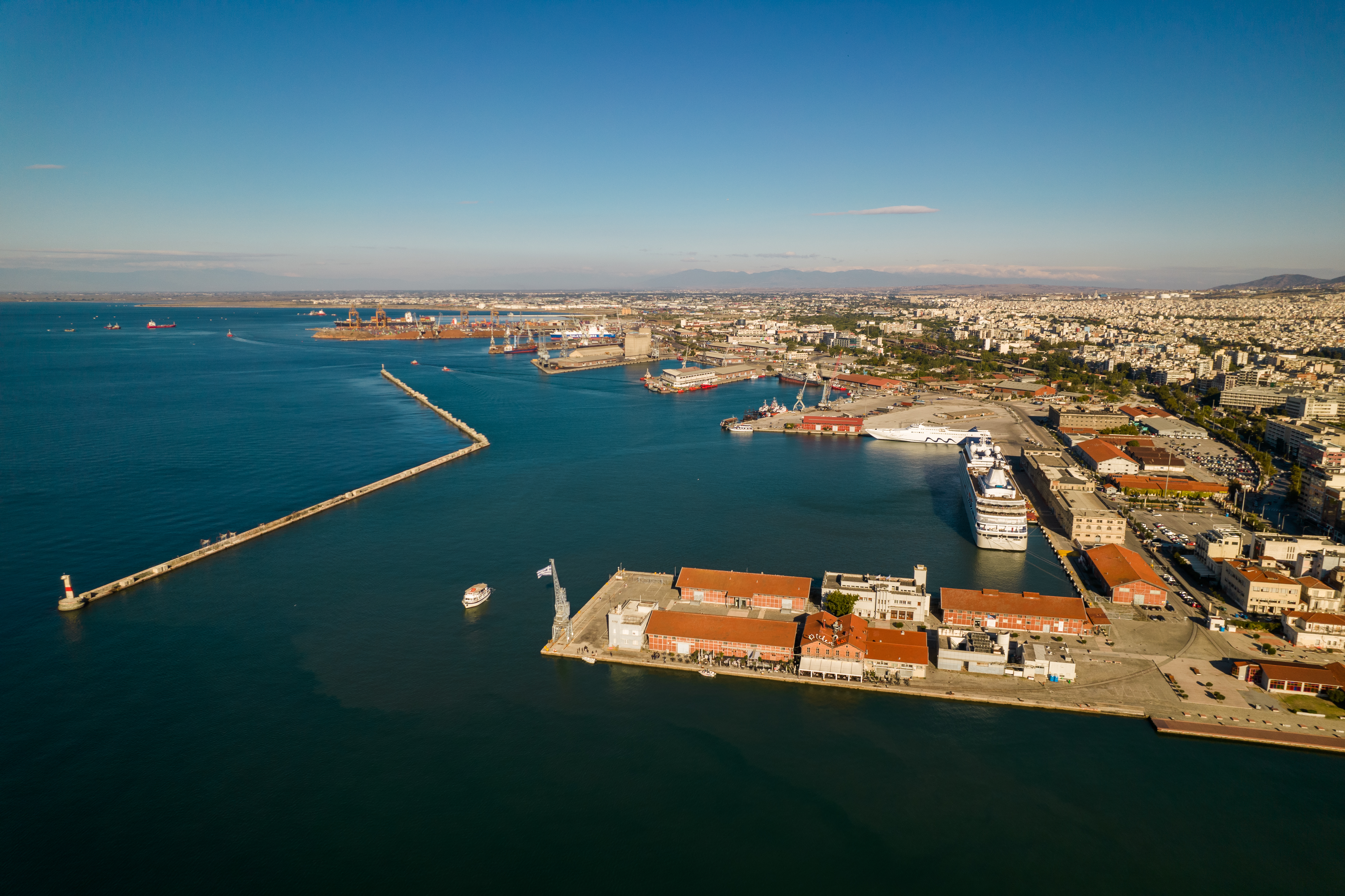
- Overview
- Interactive map of Port of Thessaloniki

Location
- Country: Greece
- Location: Thessaloniki
- UN/LOCODE: GRSKG

Details
- Operated by: Thessaloniki Port Authority (Athex: OLTH)
- Owned by: South Europe Gateway Thessaloniki Ltd (67%); Belterra Investments Ltd – 71.85% Terminal Link SAS – 33% HRADF (7.27%); Other Shareholders (25.73%)
- Type of harbour: Natural/Artificial
- Size: 155 ha (1.55 sq km)
- Employees: 492 (2023)
- Executive Chairman: Athanasios Liagkos

Statistics
- Vessel arrivals: 2.098 vessels (2023)
- Annual cargo tonnage: 16.777.263 tonnes (2023)
- Annual container volume: 520.048 TEU's (2023)
- Annual revenue: €85.822 million (2023)
- Net income: €17.527 million (2023)
- Website www.thpa.gr

The Port of Thessaloniki (Greek: Λιμάνι της Θεσσαλονίκης) is the main maritime gateway to Southeast, Central and Eastern Europe, strategically located in Northern Greece close to the major Trans-European motorway (inter alia Via Carpathia) and railway networks with direct access to the Southeastern European countries. ThPA S.A., listed on the Athens Stock Exchange since 2001, handles containers, conventional cargo, operates the free zone of the Port in accordance with tax and customs legislation currently in force authorized with AEO License, offers intermodal rail services and serves passenger traffic through cruise and ferry.

Following the privatization process, 67% of the Company’s (ThPA S.A.) share capital was transferred to South Europe Gateway Thessaloniki (SEGT) Ltd on March 23, 2018. SEGT Ltd. consisted then of "Deutsche Invest Equity Partners GmbH" (owning directly 47%), "Terminal Link SAS" (owning directly 33%) and "Belterra Investments Ltd." (owning directly 20%). The Greek State, via HRADF, retains since privatization a stake of 7.27% of ThPA S.A. and the remaining 25.73% is free float. On June 4, 2021, the shareholding structure of SEGT Ltd. was changed since shareholder “Belterra Investments Ltd.” purchased the entire share of "Deutsche Invest Equity Partners GmbH", therefore owning directly 67% and consequently becoming the controlling shareholder of SEGT Ltd. On 7 December 2021 Belterra, with beneficial owner Mr. Niko Savvidi, purchased a 299,855 shares of ThPA S.A.

Before this acquisition, Belterra had already purchased 189,447 shares that accounted for 1.88% of the total paid-up share capital of the Company. Following the above acquisition, the total number of shares and equal voting rights of the Company directly owned by Belterra is 489,302 and corresponds to 4.85% of its share capital.

Therefore, the total number of shares and the equivalent voting rights of Belterra, both directly and indirectly to the Company - through its direct participation in SEGT (which holds 67% of the shares and voting rights of the Company) - amounts to 7,242,902 which accounts for 71.85% of its share capital.

== Statistics ==
In 2023 the Port of Thessaloniki handled 16.777.263 tonnes of cargo and 520.048 TEU, making it one of the busiest cargo ports in Greece and the second largest container port in the country.

General Statistics 2023 (in tonnes)

Years	2023
General cargo	6.177.662
Liquid bulk	8.193.029
Dry bulk	2.406.572
Containers (TEU)	520.048
Total	17.297.311

== Services ==
=== Container Terminal ===
The Port of Thessaloniki is the country’s largest export port and the main sea gate of the Balkans and Southeast Europe. Containers are handled through a specially designed area located in the western part of Pier 6. The 550m long and 340m wide Container Terminal is part of the Free Zone, connected with the national rail network, and extends over a surface area of 254,000 m2. For the time being, it can accommodate small and medium-sized ships (feeder vessels) with a draught of up to 12 meters and maximum capacity of 550,000 TEU.

=== Conventional Cargo Terminal ===
The Port of Thessaloniki is the first Conventional Cargo Transit Port of Greece and one of the main ports in the Eastern Mediterranean. It has fourteen (14) quays suitable for all types of bulk and break bulk cargo, all of them connected to the national and international rail networks. The total length of quay walls is 4,200 meters.

=== Cruise & Ferry ===
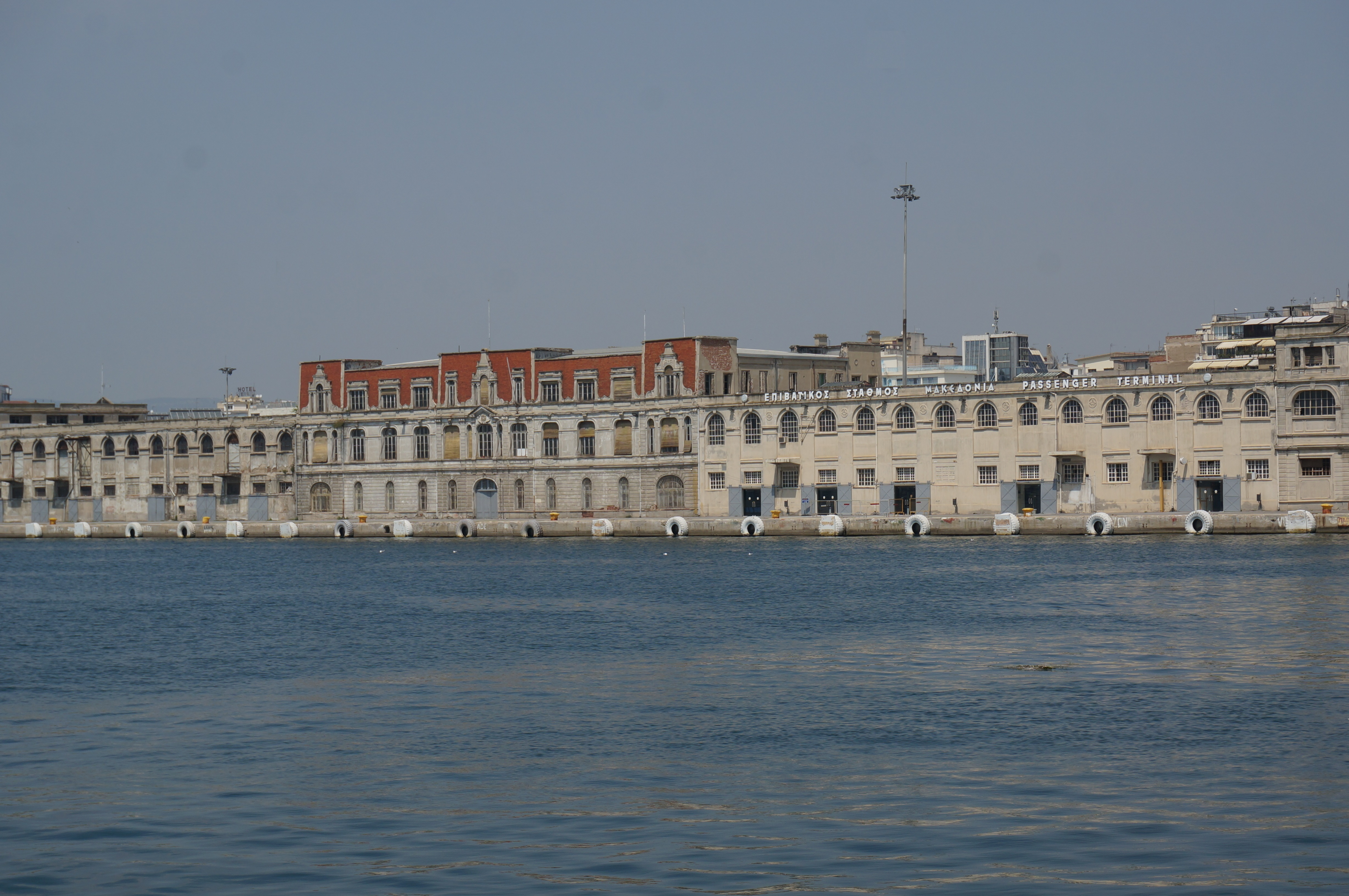
The main building of the passenger terminal

The Port of Thessaloniki has one of the largest passenger terminals in the Aegean Sea basin. The building of the passenger terminal, previously the customs house, was constructed in the last three years of the Ottoman period (1909-1912) by the local Jewish architect Eli Modiano, based on designs by the Franco-Levantine architect Alexander Vallaury.

The Passenger Terminal of the Port of Thessaloniki is fully compliant with the International Ship and Port Facility Security Code (ISPS Code) and has facilities for the reception and service of passenger traffic (cruise and ferry). Thessaloniki, due to its proximity to places of great cultural interest and the very close distance of the port from the city center, has been an increasingly popular cruise destination in recent years. The Port of Thessaloniki has ferry connections with the islands of the Northeast Aegean, the Cyclades, the Sporades (Skiathos, Skopelos and Alonissos) and Izmir.

Company	Vessels	Destinations
Blue Star Ferries	Blue Star Myconos	Agios Kirykos, Chios, Evdilos, Karlovasi, Lemnos, Mykonos, Mytilene, Piraeus, Syros, Vathy
Levante Ferries	Smyrna di Levante	İzmir
Seajets	Notre Dame, Superstar II	Alonissos, Mantoudi, Skiathos, Skopelos

=== Logistic Activities/Development of Spaces ===
In the port zone, outdoor storage areas and warehouses are rented for logistics activities. Specifically, ThPA S.A. has 45,000 m2 of covered space for different types of logistic activities and 670,000 m2 of outdoor storage areas available for rent. At the same time, ThPA S.A. has outdoor and indoor facilities that can accommodate various activities and events. ThPA S.A. has developed and operates two modern outdoor car parking lots in Piers No 1 & No 2, with a total capacity of 595 vehicles.

=== Thessaloniki Port Intermodal Rail Services ===
ThPA S.A. from November 27, 2020 offers Intermodal Rail Services with direct rail connectivity between the Port of Thessaloniki and the Company's dry port in Sofia, Bulgaria. Additionally, from August 2022, ThPA S.A. offers direct rail connectivity between the Port of Thessaloniki and Nis (Serbia).

== Other ==
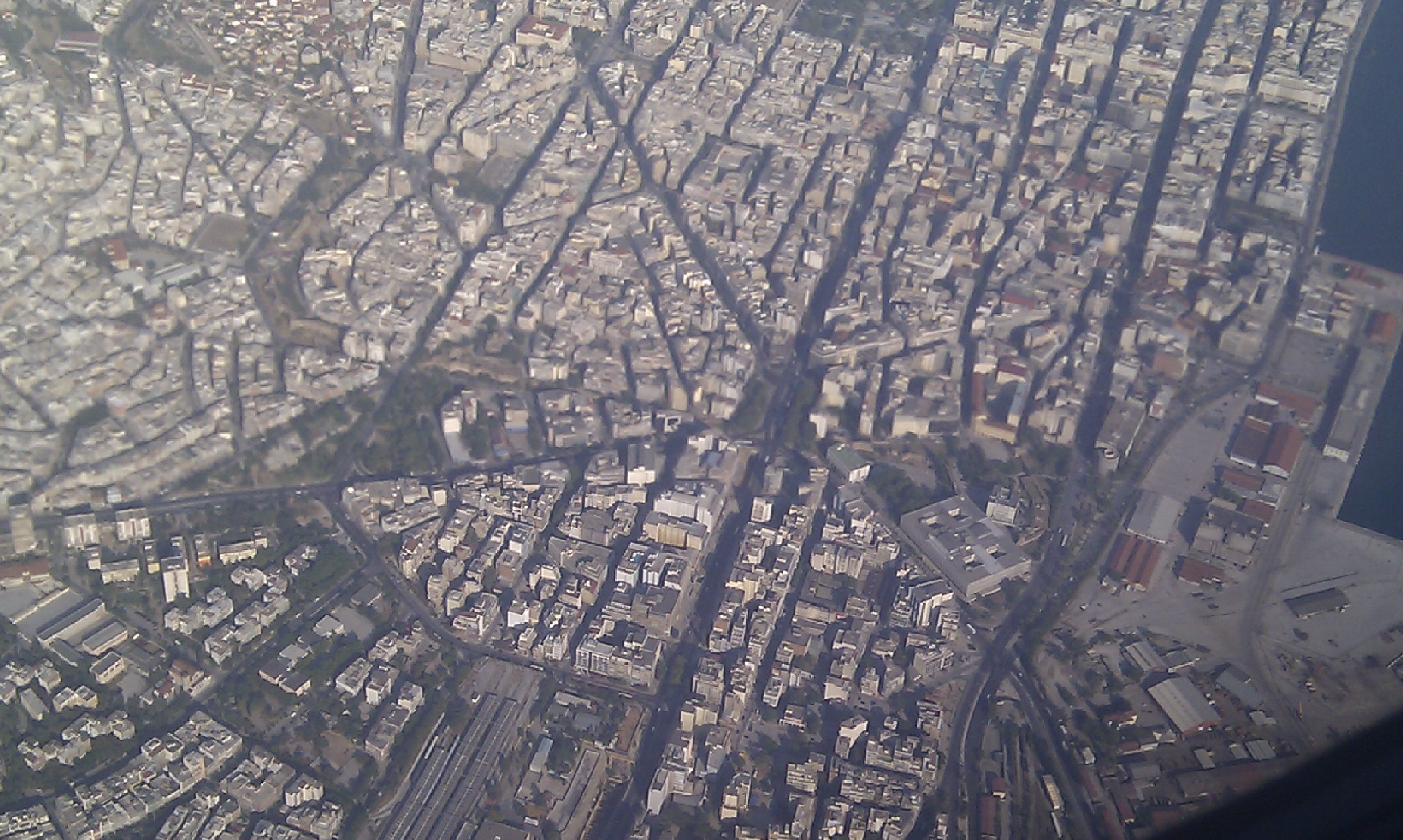
View of Vardaris area

In the area above the port, traditionally called "Vardaris" (and "Varonou Hirs", Baron Hirsch, a quarter of the area), the Holocaust Museum of Greece, among others, is being constructed. The old railway station, from where the Jews of the city were deported to Auschwitz concentration camp, was located in this area and the museum is being constructed on land leased by the Hellenic Railways Organisation. The Municipality of Thessaloniki also wants to create a Metropolitan Park, a Memorial Park and a Jewish school in the same area.

== Bibliography ==
- Stroux, Salinia (2008). "Contesting Nodes of Migration and Trade in Public Space: Thessaloniki's Bazaar Economy". In Kokot, Waltraut; Gandelsman-Trier, Mijal; Wildner, Kathrin; Wonneberger, Astrid (eds.). Port Cities as Areas of Transition. Ethnographic Perspectives (PDF). Bielefeld: transcript-Verlag. pp. 145–168. ISBN 978-3-89942-949-7.
