= Temple Hall (ship) =

Cargo ship wrecked in the Canary Islands in 1981

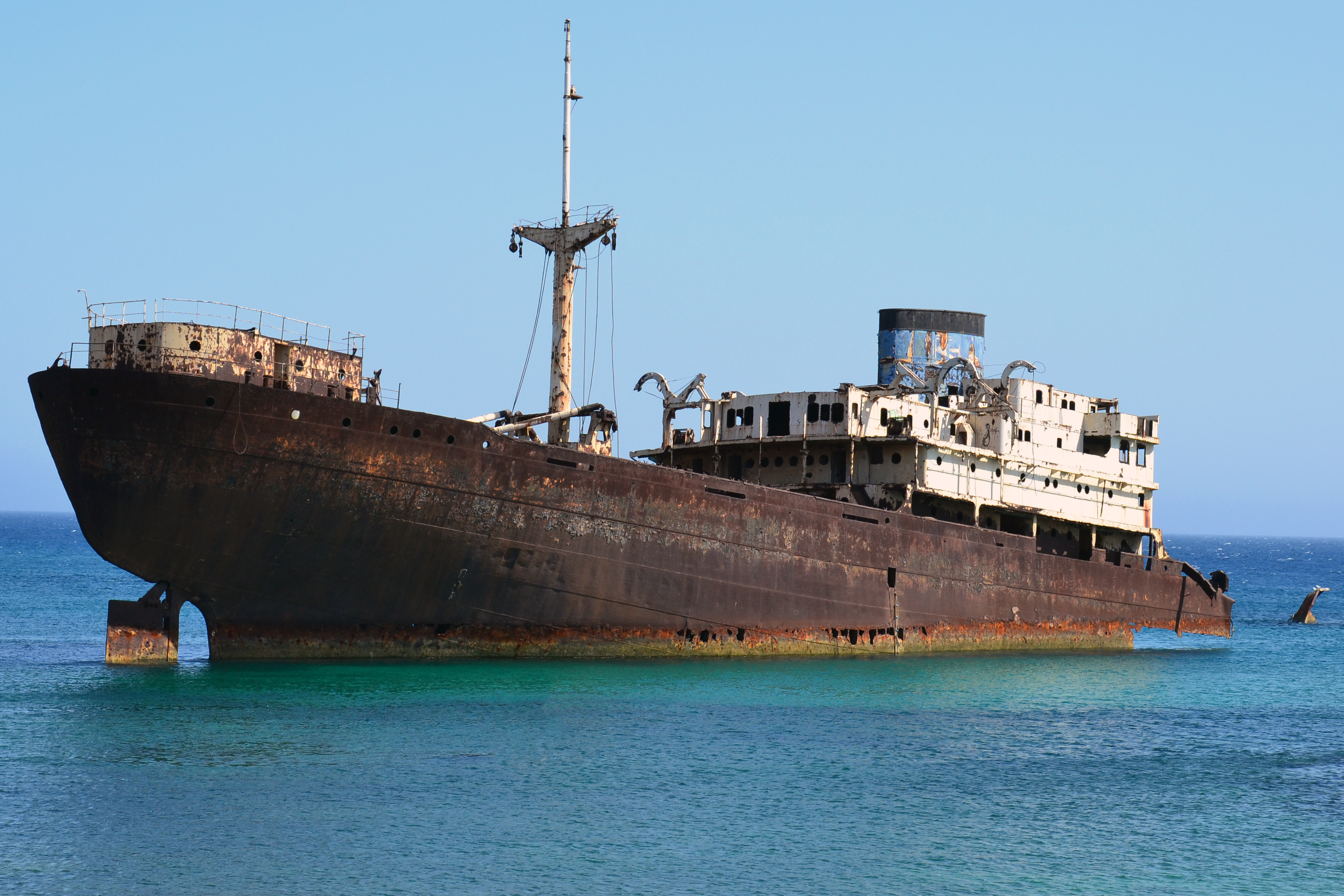
- Aft part of Telamon's wreck at Arrecife in 2013

History
- Name: 1954: Temple Hall; 1969: Pantelis; 1977: Telamon
- Namesake: 1977: Telamon
- Owner: 1954: Temple SS Co Ltd; 1969: Demetrios Margaronis; 1970: CN Para Viajes S América SA; 1977: Telamon Maritime Co SA
- Operator: 1954: Lambert Brothers; 1977: Armour Shipping SA
- Port of registry: 1954: (United Kingdom) London; 1969: (Greece) Piraeus
- Builder: Caledon Shipbuilding & Engineering Company, Dundee
- Yard number: 489
- Launched: 24 September 1953
- Completed: February 1954
- Identification: UK official number 186015; UK call sign GQZD; IMO number 5354896
- Fate: Beached, 31 October 1981; Scrapping commenced September 2022; Scrapping suspended indefinitely June 2023

General characteristics
- Type: Cargo ship
- Tonnage: 8,003 GRT, 4,584 NRT, 10,405 DWT
- Length: 458 ft 0 in (139.6 m) overall; 436.2 ft (133.0 m) p/p
- Beam: 58 ft 8 in (17.9 m)
- Draught: 26 ft 11 1/4 in (8.21 m)
- Depth: 34.9 ft (10.6 m)
- Decks: 2
- Propulsion: 1 × screw propeller; 1 × Two-stroke diesel engine
- Speed: 12 1/2 knots (23.2 km/h)
- Crew: 29
- Sensors & processing systems: Wireless direction finding; Echo sounding device; Gyrocompass; radar

Temple Hall was a cargo motor ship that was built in Dundee, Scotland in 1954. She was later renamed Pantelis in 1969 and then again as Telamon in 1977.

In 1981 Telamon sprang a leak in a storm and was beached on Lanzarote in the Canary Islands to prevent her sinking. A subsequent storm broke the wreck in two, and the forward part sank.

The aft part of the wreck remained above water, forming a local landmark and sea mark for more than four decades. Work to dismantle the wreck in situ began in 2022. The work was indefinitely suspended in mid-2023.

== Building ==
Caledon Shipbuilding & Engineering Company built the ship in Dundee as yard number 489. She was launched on 24 September 1953 and completed in February 1954. She was a three-island general cargo ship, with her main superstructure amidships. Her length was 458 ft 0 in (139.6 m) overall and 436.2 ft (133.0 m) between perpendiculars. Her beam was 58 ft 8 in (17.9 m), her depth was 34.9 ft (10.6 m) and her draught was 26 ft 11 1/4 in (8.21 m). Her tonnages were 8,003 GRT, 4,584 NRT and 10,405 DWT.

She had a single screw, driven by a four-cylinder two-stroke diesel engine that was built by Vickers-Armstrongs of Barrow-in-Furness and gave her a speed of 12 1/2 knots (23.2 km/h).

Caledon built a sister ship, Temple Main, for the same customer. She was launched on 22 November 1957 and completed in April 1958.

== Owners and operators ==
Her first owner was the Temple Steam Ship Company, which had a fleet of tramp ships whose names all began with "Temple" and were managed by Lambert Brothers Ltd. Her owners registered her at London. Her UK official number was 186015 and her call sign was GQZG.

In 1969 the Temple Steam Ship Co sold Temple Hall and Temple Main to different Greek buyers. Demetrios P Margaronis bought Temple Hall, renamed her Pantelis, and registered her in Piraeus. A year later he sold her on to the Compañia Naviera Para Sud América SA. This company was registered Panama, but kept Pantelis registered in Piraeus.

In 1977 the Telamon Maritime Company SA acquired Pantelis, renamed her Telamon, and appointed a Greek company, Armour Shipping Inc, to manage her. When IMO numbers were introduced, Telamon became IMO 5354896.

== Loss and wreck ==
In October 1981, Telamon was en route from San-Pédro and Abidjan in Ivory Coast to Thessaloniki with a cargo of logs. On 31 October she was in the strait of La Bocayna between the Canary Islands of Fuerteventura and Lanzarote when she developed a leak in one of her holds in a heavy storm. Her crew operated her bilge pump, but the water level in the hold continued to rise.

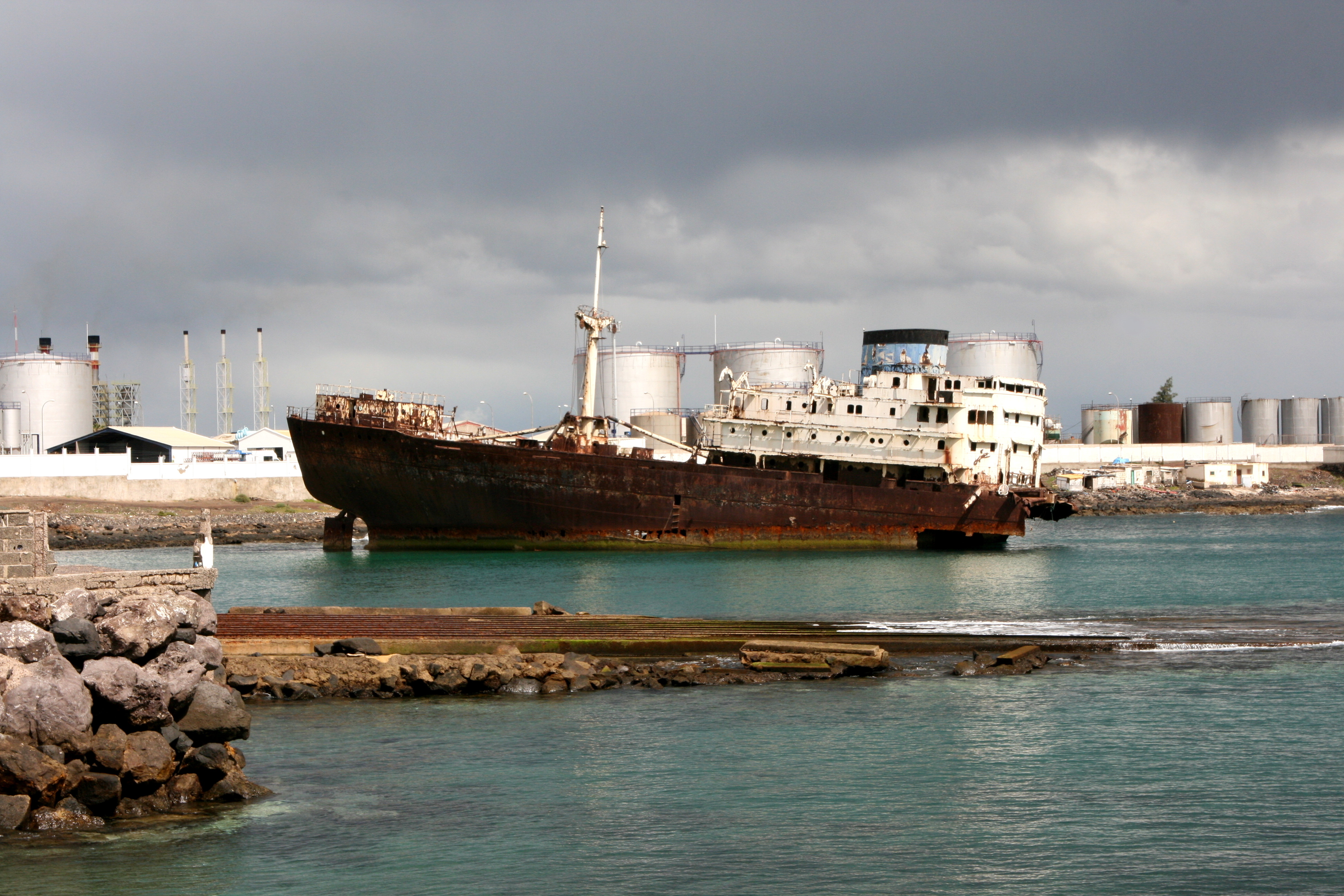
Aft part of Telamon's wreck in 2011, with the DISA oil tanks in the background

Telamon's captain, Manolis Avtzigiannis, contacted the harbour master at Los Mármoles, Arrecife, via VHF radio, requesting emergency assistance. The harbour master, Antonion Sivera, had the ship manoeuvered with the aid of two lines attached to the shore, and grounded on the soft beach in the Las Caletas area of the port, near the DISA oil tanks. This saved Telemon from sinking, and also prevented her from accidentally blocking the harbour.

Telemon's bunkers contained 260 tonnes of heavy fuel oil and 60 tonnes of diesel fuel. On 1 November, technicians from an environmental organisation flew from London to Lanzarote with equipment to contain any leak and disperse any oil if it escaped from the wreck into the water. Days later a Cepsa coaster, the 851 GRT Mayorga, came alongside and discharged the oil. Thereafter, Telamon's cargo of timber was discharged and brought ashore.

A company considered refloating Telamon, but the cost was estimated at 100,000,000 Spanish pesetas, so the wreck was left in situ. A subsequent storm broke the back of the wreck forward of the main superstructure amidships. The bow section changed position and is submerged. Divers explored and videoed this part of the wreck in 2010. The wreck remained at 28°58′32.6″N 13°31′21.5″W, visible from the Avenida de los Corales. The stern out was of the water, and the main superstructure amidships remained intact.

== Scrapping ==
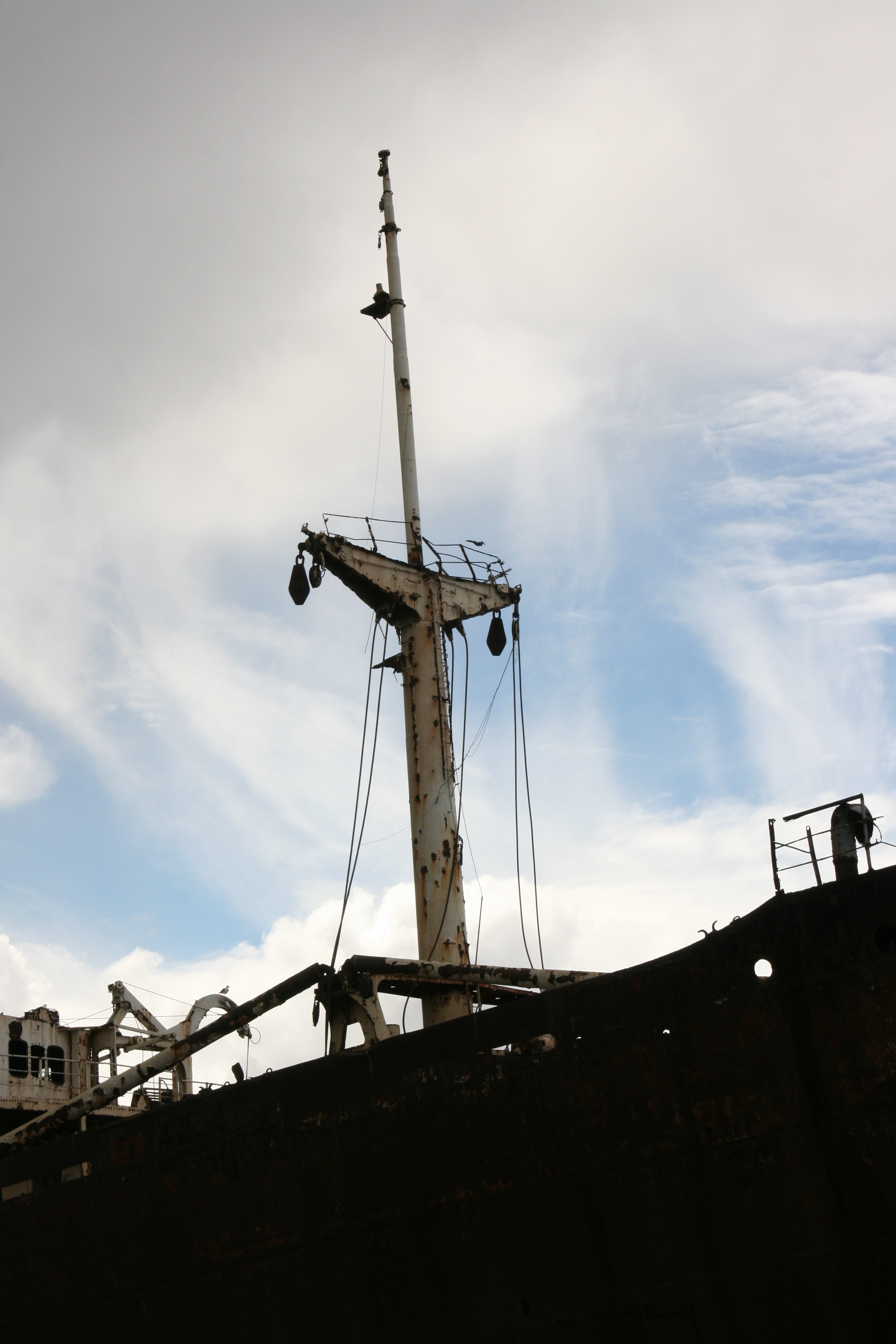
The mizzen mast of Telamon's wreck in 2011

In 2014 the Las Palmas Port Authority authorised a local company, Recuperadora Lanzaroteña, to dismantle and scrap the wreck, but work did not begin. In 2019 the Spanish Ministry of Defence authorised the wreck's removal, and the Junta Delegada de Enajenaciones y Liquidadora de Material de Canarias ("Delegated Board of Disposals and Liquidator of Material of the Canary Islands", or JDELMCANAR) issued an invitation to tender for contractors to bid for the contract. Recuperadora Lanzaroteña was the only company that submitted a bid. JDELMCANAR and the Spanish Navy initially accepted the bid, but in January 2020 withdrew acceptance because of concerns about Recuperadora Lanzaroteña's tax arrangements and authorisation for waste management.

The Navy then issued a new invitation to tender, and in October 2021 awarded a new contract to Recuperadora Lanzaroteñas, which began dismantling the ship in September 2022. The dismantling work was suspended indefinitely in June 2023.

== Bibliography ==
- Register Book. Vol. II M–Z. London: Lloyd's Register of Shipping. 1953 – via Internet Archive.
- Lloyd's Register of Shipping. Vol. II M–Z. London: Lloyd's Register of Shipping. 1954 – via Internet Archive.
- Register Book. Vol. I Register of Ships. London: Lloyd's Register of Shipping. 1955 – via Internet Archive.
- Register Book. Vol. I Register of Ships. London: Lloyd's Register of Shipping. 1959 – via Internet Archive.
