= List of companies of Greece =

Location of Greece

Greece is a country in southeastern Europe. Greece is a developed country with an advanced high-income economy, a high quality of life, and a very high standard of living. A founding member of the United Nations, Greece was the tenth member to join the European Communities (precursor to the European Union) and has been part of the Eurozone since 2001. It is also a member of numerous other international institutions, including the Council of Europe, the North Atlantic Treaty Organization (NATO), the Organisation for Economic Co-operation and Development (OECD), the World Trade Organization (WTO), the Organization for Security and Co-operation in Europe (OSCE), and the Organisation internationale de la Francophonie (OIF). Greece's unique cultural heritage, large tourism industry, prominent shipping sector and geostrategic importance classify it as a middle power. It is the second-largest economy in the Balkans, where it is an important regional investor.

S.A. (Greek: A.E) is used as a suffix to denote a public limited company, as in Plc. For further information on the types of business entities in this country and their abbreviations, see "Business entities in Greece".

== Largest Firms ==
This list shows firms in the Forbes Global 2000, which ranks firms by total revenues reported before 31 March 2018.

Rank	Image	Name	2018 Revenues (USD $B)	Employees	Notes
1606		Piraeus Bank	$3.3 B	15,546	The company operates through four business segments: Retail Banking, Corporate Banking, Investment Banking, Asset Management & Treasury.
1616		National Bank of Greece	$2.4 B	11,501	operates its business through the following business segments: Retail Banking, Corporate and Investment Banking; Global Markets and Asset Management; Insurance; International Banking Operations; Turkish Banking Operation and Others.
1626		Alpha Bank	$3.5 B	11,727	Its products include housing loans, investment products, deposit accounts, cards, consumer loans, private banking and bancassurance. It also offers car insurance and web banking.
1632		Eurobank Ergasias	$2.2 B	8,617	Engages in the provision of retail, private, corporate, private banking, asset management, insurance, treasury, capital markets, and other services.
1736		Hellenic Petroleum	$9 B	3,409	Its activities include supply, refining, and trading of petroleum products; fuels oil marketing; petrochemical or chemical production and trading; oil and gas exploration and production; power generation & trading and natural gas; renewable energy sources production and trading; provision of consulting and engineering services to hydrocarbon related project; and participation in the transportation of crude oil and products.
1860		Bank of Greece	$1.7 B	1,864	Supervises credit institutions, insurance and reinsurance firms; manages and operates payment and securities settlement systems; holds and manages the country's official reserve assets such as foreign exchange and gold reserves; acts as treasurer and fiscal agent of the government; compiles and publishes monetary and credit aggregates; and monitors and analyses the economic conjuncture and monetary policy.

== Notable firms ==
This list includes notable companies with primary headquarters located in the country. The industry and sector follow the Industry Classification Benchmark taxonomy. Organizations which have ceased operations are included and noted as defunct.

Notable companies Status: P=Private, S=State; A=Active, D=Defunct
Name	Industry	Sector	Headquarters	Founded	Notes	Status	
4E TV	Consumer services	Media	Thessaloniki	1994	Broadcasting & religion	P	A
Abea	Consumer goods	Food products	Chania	1889	Olive oil	P	A
Achaia Clauss	Consumer Goods	Beverages	Patras	1861	Wine	P	A
ADMIE	Utilities	Electricity	Athens	2012	Infrastructure	P	A
Aegean Airlines	Consumer services	Travel & Leisure	Athens	1987	Airline	P	A
Aegean Speed Lines	Industrials	Marine transportation	Glyfada	2005	Shipping	P	A
Aegek SA	Industrials	Heavy construction	Marousi	1949	Construction	P	A
Aeolian Investment Fund S.A.	Financials	Financial services	Athens	1992	Capital markets, investments	P	A
Air Mediterranean	Consumer services	Airlines	Athens	2017	Airline	P	A
Alfa-Beta Vassilopoulos	Consumer services	Food retailers	Athens	1939	Food retailers & wholesalers, owned by Ahold Delhaize	P	A
Allatini	Consumer goods	Food products	Thessaloniki	1858	Biscuits	P	A
Alpha Bank	Financials	Banks	Athens	1879	Bank	P	A
Alpha Records	Consumer services	Media	Athens	1987	Record producer	P	A
Alpha TV	Consumer services	Media	Athens	1996	Broadcasting & entertainment	P	A
ALUMIL Aluminium Industry S.A	Basic materials	Industrial metals & mining	Kilkis	1988	Nonferrous Metals, Aluminium	P	A
Aluminium of Greece	Basic materials	Industrial metals & mining	Marousi	1960	Aluminium, part of Mytilineos Holdings	P	A
Amjet Executive	Consumer services	Travel & Leisure	Athens	2009	Airline	P	A
ANEK Lines	Industrials	Industrial Transportation	Chania	1967	Marine transportation	P	A
ANT1 Group	Consumer services	Media	Athens	1989	Media agencies	P	A
Arapian	Consumer goods	Food products	Athens	1935	Charcuterie business	P	A
Arcadia Shipmanagement	Industrials	Marine transportation	Athens	1998	Shipping	P	A
Archirodon	Industrials	Heavy construction	Dordrecht	1959	Construction, energy	P	A
Atcom	Technology	Software & computer	Athens	1997	Software	P	A
Athens Exchange	Financials	Equity investment	Athens	1876	Stocks, Bonds, Derivatives & CO2	P	A
Athens-Macedonian News Agency	Consumer services	Media	Athens	2008	New agency	S	A
Athens Metro	Consumer services	Travel & leisure	Athens	1869	Athens subway	S	A
Atlas Maritime	Industrials	Marine transportation	Athens	2004	Shipping and oil transportation	P	A
Attica Bank	Financials	Banks	Athens	1925	Bank	P	A
Attica Group	Industrials	Marine transportation	Athens	1918	Ferry service	P	A
Aventurine SA	Technology	Video game industry	Athens	2003	MMORPG	P	A
Avin International	Industrials	Marine transportation	Maroussi	1977	Oil transportation	P	A
Bank of Greece	Financials	Banks	Athens	1928	Central bank	P	A
Barbastathis	Consumer services	Food & Beverages	Thessaloniki	1969	Frozen Foods	P	A
Bazaar	Consumer services	Food retailers	Athens	-	Supermarkets	P	A
Beat	Consumer services	Transportation networking	Athens	2011	Taxi service	P	A
Berios	Industrials	Heavy construction	Athens	1984	Civil engineering, construction	P	A
Bioman	Consumer goods	Industrial parts	Tavros	1976	Lifting machinery	P	A
Black Lotus Records	Consumer services	Media	Athens	1998	Record producer	P	A
Bluebird Airways	Consumer services	Airlines	Heraklion	2008	Airline	P	A
Blue Star Ferries	Industrials	Marine transportation	Athens	2000	Ferry Boats	P	A
Centric Multimedia	Consumer services	Multimedia	Athens	1995	Multimedia	P	A
Ceres Hellenic Shipping Enterprises	Industrials	Marine transportation	Pireus	1949	Ship management	P	A
CERETETH	Technology	Research	Volos	2006	Research institute	S	A
Chalkis Shipyards (Aulida)	Industrials	Heavy construction	Chalkis	1971	Construction	P	A
Chipita	Food & Beveradges	Food & Beveradges	Athens	1973	Famous food brands	P	A
Coca-Cola Hellenic Bottling Company	Consumer services	Food & Beverages	Zug	1969	Beverages	P	A
Coffee Island	Consumer services	Restaurants & bars	Patras	1999	Coffee house	P	A
Compupress	Consumer services	Publishing	Athens	1982	Magazine and book publishing	P	A
Consolidated Contractors Company	Industrials	Heavy construction	Athens	1952	Construction, Oil & Gas	P	A
Cosmote	Telecommunications	Mobile telecommunications	Athens	1998	Mobile telephony operator	P	A
Costamare	Industrials	Marine transportation	Monaco	1975	Shipping	P	A
DEPA	Oil & gas	Exploration & production	Athens	1988	Natural gas	P	A
DESFA	Oil & gas	Exploration & production	Chalandri	2007	Natural gas	P	A
Diana	Consumer goods	Automobiles & parts	Tavros	1976	Agricultural machinery	P	A
Digea	Broadcast	Digital Provider	Athens	2009	Broadcaster	P	A
Digital Union	Consumer services	Media	Athens	2008	Broadcasting	P	A
Dodekanisos Seaways	Industrials	Marine transportation	Rhodes	1990	Ferry service	P	A
DryShips Inc	Industrials	Marine transportation	Athens	2004	Shipping company	P	A
ELCO	Consumer goods	Household goods	Lykovrysi	1960	Durable Household Products	P	A
Epsa	Consumer goods	Soft drinks	Pilio	1924	Soft drinks	P	A
Elefsis Shipyards	Industrials	Heavy construction	Eleusis	1962	Construction	P	A
ELFE	Basic materials	Speciality chemicals	Athens	1961	Fertilisers	P	A
Ellaktor	Industrials	Heavy construction	Kifissia	1977	Construction, energy	P	A
Ellinair	Consumer services	Airlines	Thessaloniki	2013	Airline	P	A
Energean Oil & Gas	Oil & gas	Exploration & production	Maroussi	2007	Oil Company	P	A
Open TV	Consumer services	Broadcasting & entertainment	Koropi	1990		P	A
Eskimo (Feidakis Group)	Consumer goods	Household goods	Athens	1958	Durable Household Products	P	A
Estia Newspaper S.A.	Consumer services	Media	Athens	1876	Newspaper broadsheet	P	A
ETEM	Basic materials	Aluminium	Athens	1971	Aluminium	P	A
Eurobank Ergasias	Financials	Banks	Athens	1990	Bank	P	A
European Reliance	Financials	Full line insurance	Athens	1977	Insurance and asset management, owned Allianz	P	A
European Seaways	Industrials	Marine transportation	Athens	1990	Ferry service	P	A
Euroseas	Industrials	Marine transportation	Maroussi	1917	Shipping	P	A
Evga S.A.	Consumer goods	Food products	Athens	1934	Dairy	P	A
EYDAP	Utilities	Water	Galatsi	1980	Water industry	P	A
Fage	Consumer services	Food & Beverages	Strassen	1926	yogurt products	P	A
Fast Ferries	Industrials	Marine transportation	Piraeus	1998	Ferry service	P	A
Flocafé	Consumer services	Restaurants & bars	Athens	1994	Coffee chain	P	A
Finos Film	Consumer services	Film production	Athens	1943	film production	P	A
Fix Brewery	Consumer goods	Brewers	Athens	1864	Greek lager beer	P	A
Folli Follie	Consumer goods	Clothing & accessories	Athens	1982	Jewelry, watches, accessories	P	A
Forthnet	Telecommunications	Fixed line telecom.	Athens	1995	ISP	P	A
Frigoglass	Industrial	Commercial Refrigeration	Kifissia	1993	Commercial refrigeration	P	A
GainJet Aviation	Consumer services	Airlines	Athens	2006	Airline	P	A
Galaxias	Consumer services	Food retailers	Athens	1982	Supermarkets	P	A
GEK Terna	Industrials	Heavy construction	Athens	1969	Construction, energy	P	A
Germanos Group	Industrials	Electrical components	Athens	1980	Batteries	P	A
Golden Star Ferries	Industrials	Marine transportation	Andros	2011	Shipping	P	A
Goody's Burger House	Consumer services	Travel & leisure	Athens	1975	Restaurants & bar	P	A
Grecotel	Consumer services	Hospitality	Rethymno	-	Hotels	P	A
Greek Internet Exchange	Technology	Internet	Athens	2009	Internet e-infrastructure	P	A
Greek Reporter	Consumer services	Media	-	2008	New agency	P	A
Greek Wine Cellars	Consumer goods	Beverages	Markopoulo	-	Distillers & Vintners	P	A
Green Cola Company	Consumer services	Food & Beverages	Orestiada	1959	Famous brand	P	A
Green Cookie Records	Consumer services	Media	Thessaloniki	-	Record producer	P	A
Haitoglou Bros	Consumer goods	Food products	Athens	1924	Food processing	P	A
Halyvourgiki Steel	Basic materials	Iron & steel	Athens	1937	Steel	P	D
Heaven Music	Consumer services	Media	Athens	2001	Record producer	P	A
Hellas Sat	Telecommunications	Space telecommunications	Nicosia	2003	Communications Satellite	P	A
Hellenic Aerospace Industry	Industrials	Aerospace	Tanagra	1975	Aerospace	S	A
Hellenic Broadcasting Corporation	Consumer services	Broadcasting	Athens	1938	Public broadcasting	S	A
Hellenic Civil Aviation Authority	Consumer services	Ait traffic management	Glyfada	1931	Civil aviation	S	A
Hellenic Defence Systems	Industrials	Defense	Athens	2004	Defense	S	A
Hellenic Duty Free Shops	Consumer services	Broadline retailers	Agios Stefanos	1979	Travel retailer	P	A
Hellenic Electricity Distribution Network Operator	Utilities	Electricity	Athens	2009	Infrastructure	P	A
Hellenic Petroleum	Oil & gas	Exploration & production	Athens	1958	Oil Refining	P	A
Hellenic Post	Industrials	Delivery services	Athens	1828	Postal services, courier	S	A
Hellenic Railways Organisation	Infrastructure	Railway	Athens	1971	Railway	S	A
Asset Development Fund	Financials	Real estate holding	Athens	2011	Development	S	A
Hellenic Seaplanes	Consumer services	Travel & Leisure	Athens	2013	Airline	P	A
Hellenic Seaways	Industrials	Marine transportation	Athens	2005	Ferry service	P	A
Hellenic Shipyards Co.	Industrials	Industrial transportation	Skaramagas	1957	Shipyard	P	A
Hellenic Space Organization	Technology	Space	Kallithea	2018	Space Cluster & Satellites	S	A
Hellenic Sugar Industry	Consumer goods	Food producers	Thessaloniki	1960	Sugar	P	A
Hellenic Vehicle Industry	Industrials	Commercial vehicles	Thessaloniki	1972	Vehicle industry	P	A
Heracles General Cement	Industrials	Building materials & fixtures	Athens	1911	Subsidiary of Holcim	P	A
Hondos Center	Consumer services	Specialty retailers	Athens	1967	Clothing & Accessories Retailer	P	A
Hotel Grande Bretagne	Consumer services	Hotels	Athens	1874	Hotel	P	A
IANOS	Consumer services	Publishing	Thessaloniki	1984	Magazine and book publishing	P	A
I Avgi	Consumer services	Media	Athens	1952	Newspaper broadsheet	P	A
Ideal Bikes	Consumer goods	Recreational products	Patras	1977	Bicycles	P	A
IMC Technologies	Technology	Software	Athens	2004	Technology	P	A
Interbalkan Medical Center	Consumer services	Health	Thessaloniki	2000	Hospital	P	A
InternetQ	Technology	Software & computer	London	2000	Software	P	A
Intracom	Technology	Software	Athens	1977	Founded by Socrates Kokkalis	P	A
Intrakat	Industrials	Heavy construction	Paiania	1987	Construction, energy	P	A
Intralot	Consumer services	Gambling	Athens	1992	Gaming	P	A
Levante Ferries	Consumer goods	Food products	Zante	2015	Ferry services	P	A
Izola (Dimitriou Group)	Consumer goods	Household goods	Athens	1930	Durable Household Products	P	A
Kefalonian Lines	Industrials	Marine transportation	Cephalonia	2013	Ferry service	P	A
Jumbo S.A.	Consumer goods	Toys	Athens	1986	Toys	P	A
Karelia Fine Tobaccos	Consumer goods	Tobacco	Kalamata	1888	Tobaccos	P	A
Kathimerini Publishing S.A	Consumer services	Media	Neo Phaliro	1919	Newspaper broadsheet	P	A
Kioleides	Industrials	Commercial vehicles & trucks	Athens	1968	Trailers, trucks & rail wagons	P	A
Korres	Health care	Cosmetics	Athens	1996	Beauty Products	P	A
Kostoulas	Consumer services	Waste Management	Athens	1986	Recycling	P	A
Kotsovolos	Consumer services	Electronics	Athens	1950	Technology	P	A
Kyknos	Consumer goods	Food products	Ilia	1911	Sauce, canning	P	A
LAGIE	Financials	Energy Investment	Athens	2011	Energy exchange	S	A
Lambrakis Press Group	Consumer services	Publishing	Athens	1922	Mass Media	P	A
Larco	Basic materials	Industrial metals & mining	Marousi	1963	Nonferrous Metals, Nickel	P	A
Lavipharm	Health care	Pharmaceuticals	Athens	1911	Pharmaceuticals	P	A
Levante Ferries	Industrials	Marine transportation	Athens	2014	Ferry service	P	A
Lobby Music	Consumer services	Media	Athens	2010	Record producer	P	A
Loux	Consumer goods	Soft drinks	Patras	1950	Soft drinks	P	A
Majestic International Cruises	Industrials	Marine transportation	Athens	1980	Cruise service	P	A
Makedonia TV	Consumer services	Broadcasting	Thessaloniki	1991	TV channel	P	A
Malamatina	Consumer goods	Beverages	Alexandroupoli	1895	Distillers & Vintners	P	A
Marfin Investment Group	Conglomerates	–	Nea Erythraia	1998	Transportation, food & beverage, retail	P	A
MarineTraffic	Technology	Software	Athens	2007	Ship tracking intelligence	P	A
Masoutis	Consumer services	Food retailers	Thessaloniki	1976	Supermarkets	P	A
Melissa S.A.	Consumer goods	Food products	Athens	1947	Sauce, canning	P	A
Metaxa	Consumer goods	Distillers & vintners	Athens	1888	Distillery	P	A
Metka	Industrials	Heavy construction	Athens	1962	Manufacturing and construction	P	A
Metro S.A.	Consumer services	Wholesalers	Metamorfosi	1976	Supermarkets	P	A
Mevgal	Consumer goods	Food products	Koufalia	1950	Dairy products	P	A
Mikel Coffee Company	Consumer services	Restaurants & bars	Larissa	2008	Coffee chain	P	A
Minoan Lines	Industrials	Marine transportation	Heraclion	1972	Ferry service	P	A
Minos Wines	Consumer goods	Beverages	Crete	1932	Distillers & Vintners	P	A
Misko	Consumer goods	Food products	Athens	1927	Pasta	P	A
Mythos Brewery	Consumer goods	Beverages	Sindos	1968	Distillers & Vintners	P	A
Minos EMI	Consumer services	Media	Athens	1931	Record producer	P	A
MLS Innovation S.A.	Technology	Software	Thessaloniki	1989	Technology	P	A
Moreas Motorway S.A.	Industrials	Transportation services	Nestani	2006	Supervises and maintains the A7 and A71 motorways	P	A
Motomarine	Industrials	Commercial vehicles	Koropi	1962	Shipbuilding	P	A
Motor Oil Hellas	Oil & gas	Exploration & production	Athens	1970	Founded by Vardis Vardinogiannis	P	A
Mytilineos Holdings	Conglomerates	–	Maroussi	1990	Conglomerate	P	A
Naftemporiki	Consumer services	Media	Athens	1924	Newspaper broadsheet	P	A
Namco	Consumer goods	Automobiles & parts	Thessaloniki	1972	Auto parts	P	A
National Bank of Greece	Financials	Banks	Athens	1841	Bank	P	A
Navios Maritime Holdings	Industrials	Marine transportation	Pireus	1992	Shipping, logistics	P	A
Neorion	Industrials	Commercial vehicles	Ermoupolis	1820	Shipyards	P	A
Mega Channel	Consumer services	Media	Athens	1989	Broadcasting & entertainment	P	A
Nipponia	Consumer goods	Automobiles & parts	Athens	1992	Auto parts	P	A
National Hellenic Research Foundation	Technology	Research	Athens	1958	Research institute	S	A
Ocean Rig	Oil & gas	Exploration & production	Athens	1996	Drilling	P	A
Optima bank	Financials	Banks	Athens	2000	Bank	P	A
Olympic Air	Consumer services	Airlines	Spata	2009	Airline	P	A
Olympos	Consumer services	Food & Beverages	Larissa	1965	Dairy products	P	A
Olympus Airways	Consumer services	Airlines	Athens	2014	Airline	P	A
OPAP	Consumer services	Gambling	Athens	1958	Lotteries	P	A
Optima bank	Financials	Banks	Athens	2014	Bank	P	A
Orient Bikes	Consumer goods	Recreational products	Larissa	1987	Bicycles	P	A
OTE	Telecommunications	Fixed line telecom.	Maroussi	1949	Telecom, part of Deutsche Telekom	P	A
OTEGlobe	Telecommunications	Broadband and Internet	Athens	2000	Internet network operator	P	A
Ouzo Plomari	Consumer goods	Beverages	Plomari	1894	Distillers & Vintners	P	A
Papadopoulos	Consumer goods	Food products	Athens	1930	Biscuits	P	A
Papastratos	Consumer goods	Tobacco	Aspropyrgos	1830	Subsidiary of Philip Morris	P	A
Parachute Typefoundry	Technology	Type foundry	Athens	2001	Fonts for sale	P	A
PAS Giannina F.C.	Consumer services	Sports	Ioannina	1966	Football	P	A
Peiraiki	Consumer goods	Beverages	Drapetsona	-	Distillers & Vintners	P	A
Petropoulos A.E.B.E.	Consumer goods	Automobiles & parts	Thessaloniki	1922	Auto parts	P	A
Piraeus Bank	Financials	Banks	Athens	1916	Banks	P	A
Porto Carras	Consumer services	Hospitality	Sithonia	1973	Hotels	P	A
Pouliadis Associates Corporation	Technology	Software & computer	Athens	1980-2006	Software	P	A
Prapopoulos Bros s.a.	Industrials	Mechanical equipment	Patras	1886	Agricultural equipment	P	A
Profile Systems and Software	Technology	Software & computer	Athens	1990	Software	P	A
Prometheus Gas	Oil & gas	Oil Equip., serv. & distr.	Athens	1991	Oil equipment & services	P	A
Psichogios Publications	Consumer services	Publishing	Athens	1979	Magazine and book publishing	P	A
Public Power Corporation	Oil & gas	Alternative energy	Athens	1950	Alternative fuels	P	A
Pyramis	Consumer goods	Household goods	Thessaloniki	1959	Durable Household Products	P	A
RCH	Consumer goods	Automobiles & parts	Katerini	2007	Auto parts	P	A
Research Acad. Computer Tech. Institute	Technology	Research	Patras	1985	Research institute	S	A
Brink's	Consumer goods	Beverages	Rethymno	2001	Distillers & Vintners	P	A
ROAR! Rock of Angels Records	Consumer services	Media	Angelochori	2012	Record producer	P	A
Santorini Brewing Company	Consumer goods	Beverages	Santorini	2011	Distillers & Vintners	P	A
Seajets	Industrials	Marine transportation	Piraeus	1989	Ferry service	P	A
SEKA	Oil & gas	Oil Equip., serv. & distr.	Kaloi Limenes	1961	Oil equipment & services	P	A
Sergal	Consumer services	Food & Beverages	Serres	1964	Dairy products	P	A
Sfakianakis	Consumer goods	Automobiles & parts	Athens	1957	Auto parts	P	A
Skai Group	Consumer services	Media	Piraeus	1992	Broadcasting & Entertainment	P	A
Sky Express	Consumer services	Airlines	Athens	2005	Airline	P	A
Sleaszy Rider Records	Consumer services	Media	Athens	1999	Record producer	P	A
Softex	Consumer goods	Nondurable products	Athens	1936	Paper towel	P	A
Space Internetworking Center	Technology	Research	Xanthi	2010	Research institute	S	A
Spinalonga Records	Consumer services	Media	Athens	2004	Record producer	P	A
Star Channel	Consumer services	Media	Athens	1993	Broadcasting & Entertainment	P	A
State Aircraft Factory	Industrials	Aerospace & defense	Athens	1917	Aerospace	S	A
Superfast Ferries	Industrials	Industrial transportation	Athens	1993	Marine transportation	P	A
Temax	Industrials	Industrial engineering	Athens	1925	Commercial vehicles & trucks	P	A
Terkenlis	Consumer goods	Food products	Thessaloniki	1948	Food processing	P	A
Terna Energy	Oil & Gas	Alternative energy	Athens	1997	Renewable energy equipment	P	A
The Spicy Effect	Consumer services	Media	Athens	2009	Record producer	P	A
Thessaloniki Metro	Consumer services	Travel & leisure	Thessaloniki	2020	Thessaloniki subway	S	A
Thessaloniki Waterbus	Consumer goods	Food products	Thessaloniki	-	Ferry services	P	A
Theon Sensors	Industrials	Defense	Athens	2004	Defense	P	A
Titan Cement	Industrials	Construction & materials	Brussels	1902	Building Materials & fixtures	P	A
Tropical	Consumer goods	Automobiles & parts	Athens	1976	Auto parts	P	A
Tsantali	Consumer goods	Beverages	Agios Pavlos	1938	Distillers & Vintners	P	A
Variety Cruises	Industrials	Marine transportation	Athens	2006	Cruise service	P	A
Ventouris Ferries	Industrials	Marine transportation	Piraeus	1978	Ferry service	P	A
Vegas Oil and Gas	Oil & gas	Exploration & production	Athens	2003	Founded by Vardis Vardinogiannis	P	A
Vianex S.A.	Health care	Biotechnology	Athens	1971	Pharmaceuticals	P	A
Viohalco	Basic materials	Industrial metals & mining	Brussels	1937	Nonferrous Metals	P	A
Viva Wallet Group	Financials	Banks	Athens	2000	Neobank	P	A
Vivartia	Consumer goods	Food producers	Athens	1968	Food products	P	A
Vodafone Greece	Telecommunications	Mobile telecommunications	Chalandri	1992	Fixed and mobile line communications	P	A
Watt+Volt	Utilities	Conventional electricity	Athens	2011	Energy trade	P	A
Zante Ferries	Industrials	Marine transportation	Piraeus	1991	Ferry service	P	A

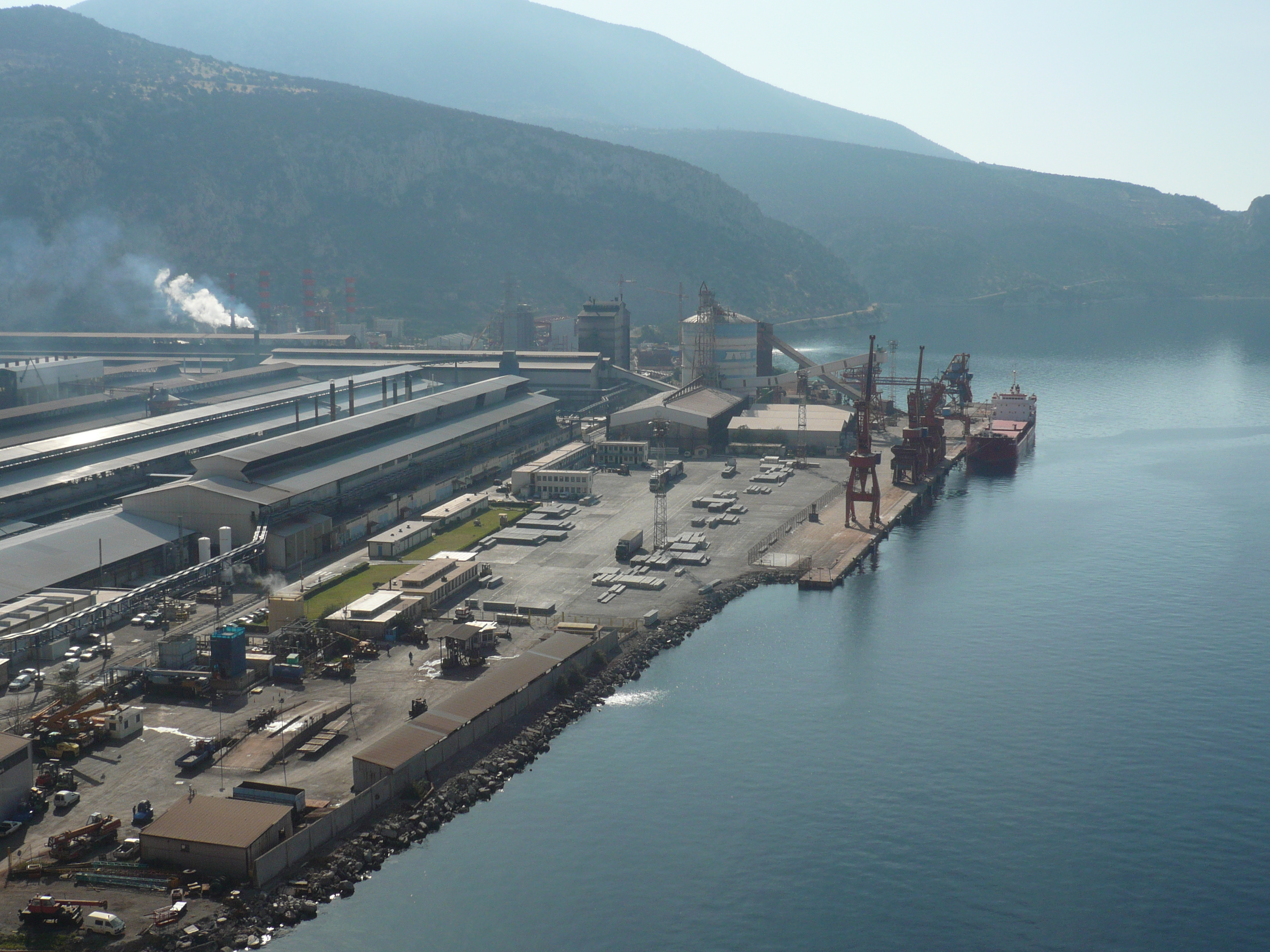
Bauxite smelting factory in Distomo.

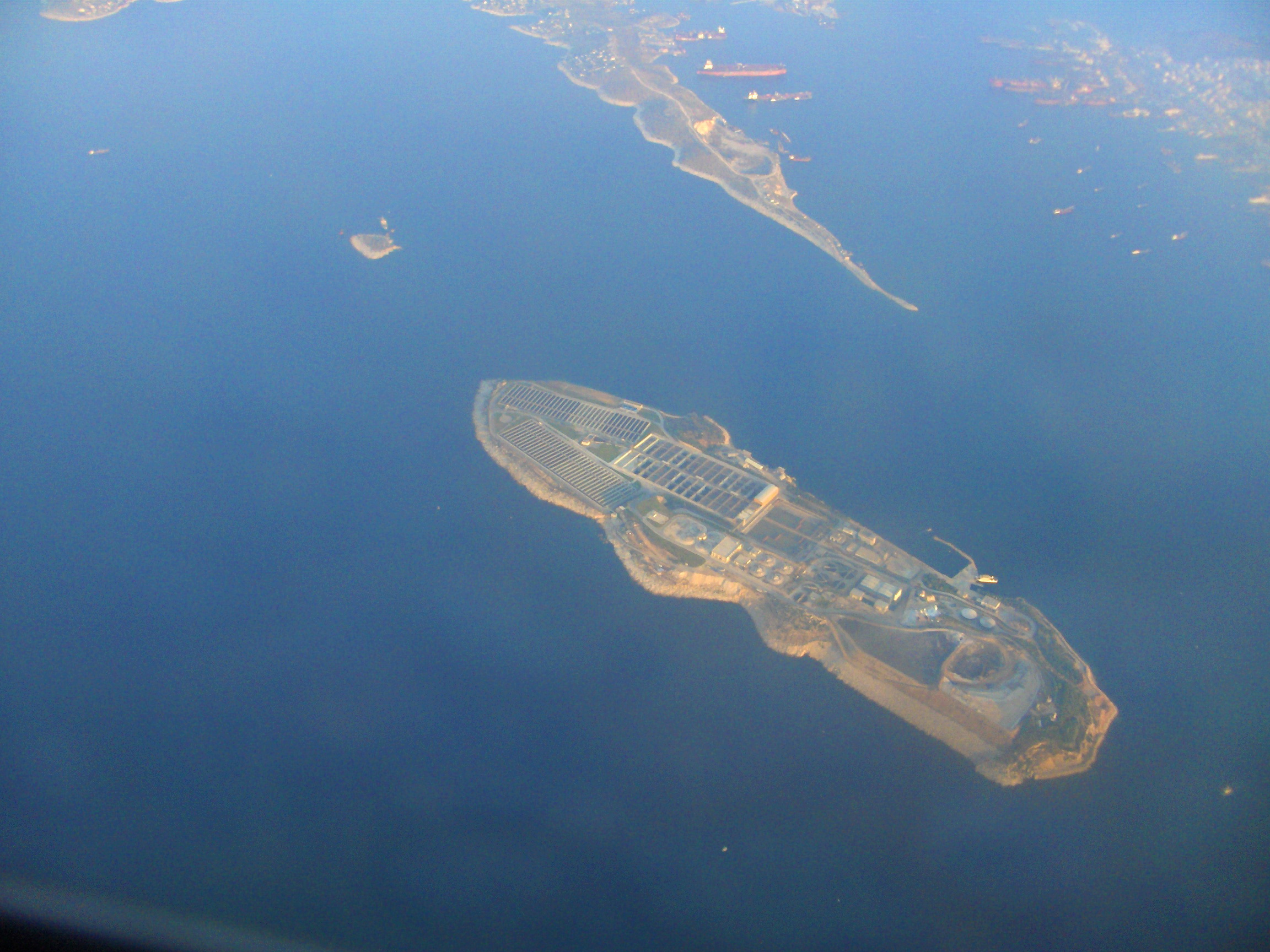
Waste water treatment in Psyttaleia.

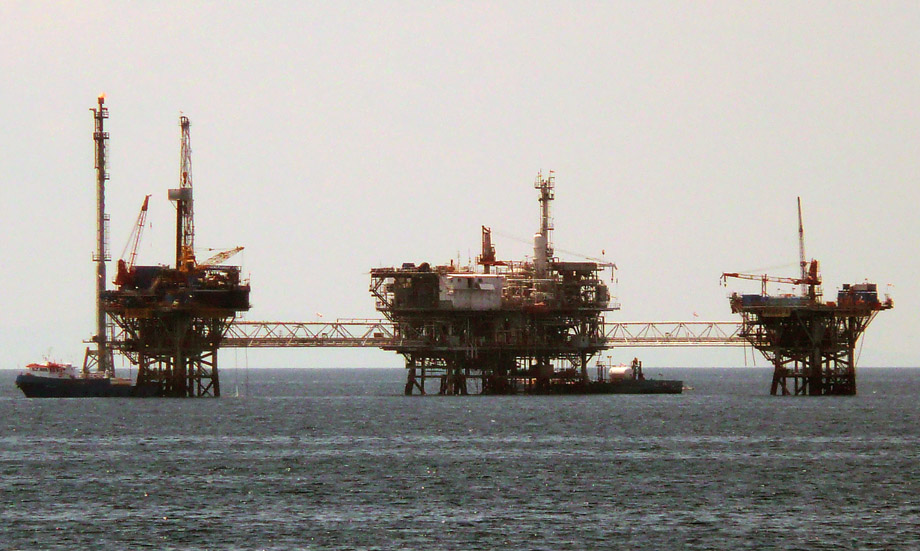
Oil extraction in Prinos.

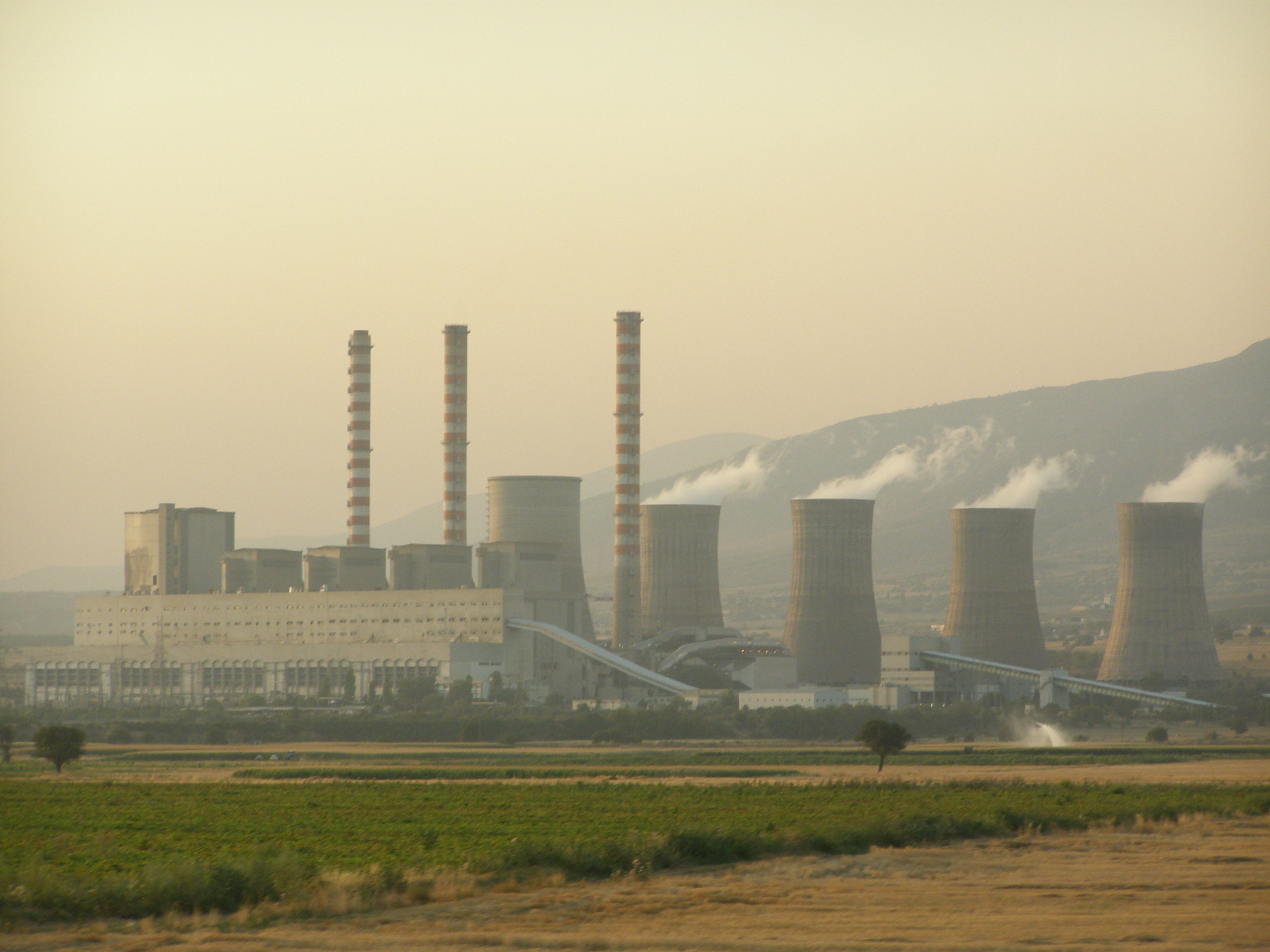
Thermal power plant in Agios Dimitrios

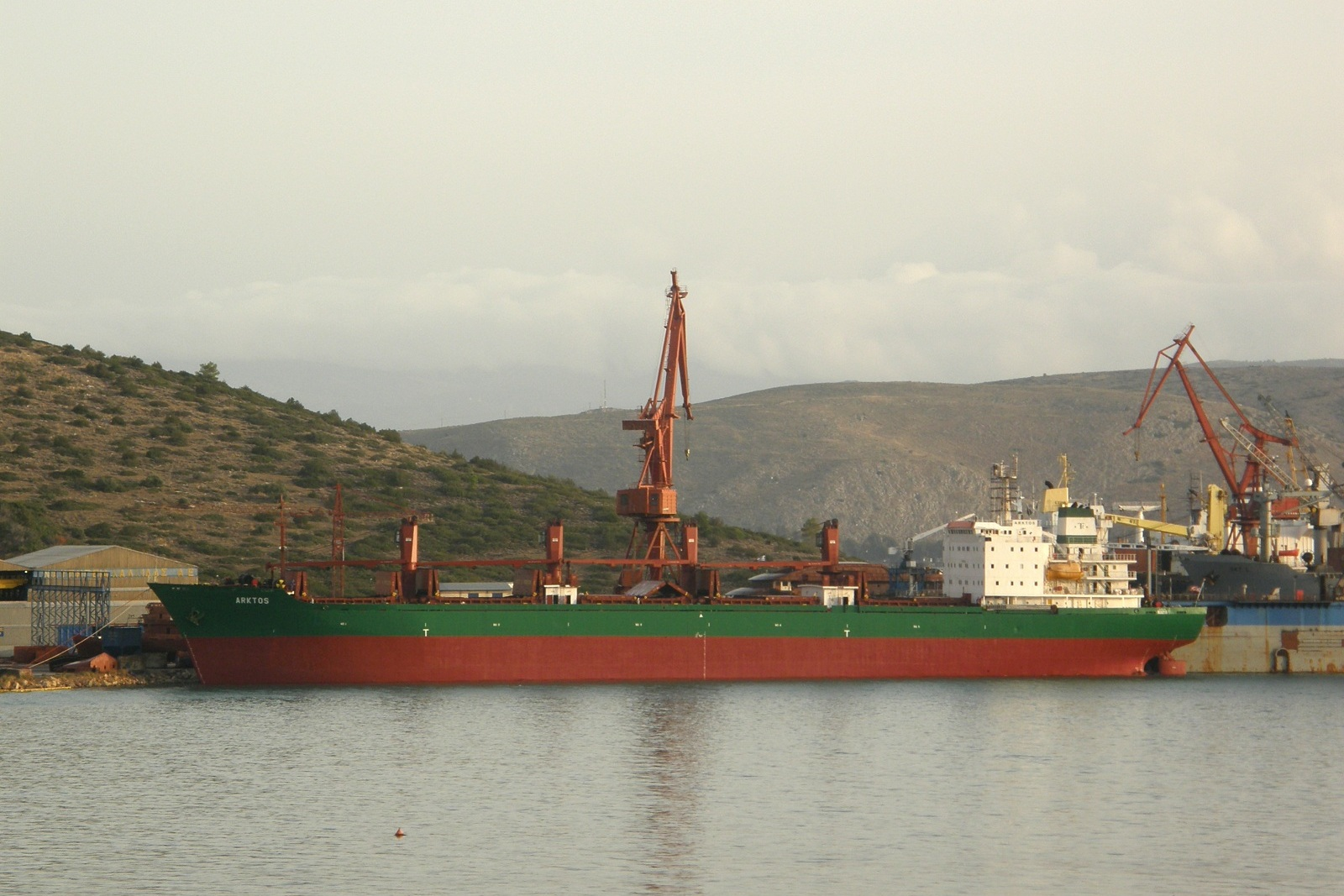
Shipyard in Chalkis.

== See also ==
- List of companies listed on the Athens Stock Exchange
- List of electric power companies in Greece
