= Melissa S.A. =

Greek food company

Melissa S.A. Μέλισσα Κίκιζας Α.Ε.
- Type: Private
- Founded: 1947 (as Pasta Industry Kikizas Bros)
- Headquarters: Athens, Greece
- Products: tomato sauce, pasta
- Number of employees: 217
- Website: www.melissa.gr/en/

Melissa S.A. (Greek: Μέλισσα Κίκιζας) is a Greek tomato sauce and pasta company, one of the major brands in the country. It was founded in 1947.

The company's products are packaged with paper cartons and Tetra Brik. Its logo has a red oval facing left to right with white rims. It has its company name in the middle. Its packaging colour is coloured green and features tomato sauce in the middle.

== See also ==
- Kyknos S.A.
- Pelargos
- List of companies in Greece
