= Pelargos =

Greek food company

- Type: private
- Industry: Food processing; Canning industry
- Headquarters: Athens, Greece
- Products: tomatoes

Pelargos (Greek: Πελαργός) is a Greek tomato company and it is one of the major tomato paste brands in the country. It is headquartered in Athens in the Athens Industrial Area west of downtown. It manufactures tomato pastes and are used on pasta, lasagna and other cuisines.

Pelargos has several factories across Greece including one 1 km southeast of the centre of Gastouni. The factory is on the southwest side of the EO9 road (Patras - Pyrgos - Kyparissia about 1 km south and east of the new one (also the E75). Its area is by 500 m and 800 m making it the largest building in town. Its production parking is also on the right side. The road to Palaiochori lies to the south. It was constructed in the mid to late-20th century and was first opened later on.

== See also ==
- List of companies in Greece
- Kyknos S.A.
