= ELCO Vagionis =

Greek home appliance company

Elco Vagionis
- Type: SA
- Industry: Manufacturing
- Founded: 1960
- Founder: Iosef Vagionis
- Headquarters: Athens, Greece
- Area served: Greece
- Products: white goods
- Owner: Pavlos Vagionis
- Number of employees: 170
- Website: http://www.elco.gr/

ELCO is the brand used by ELCO Vagionis SA, a Greek home appliance manufacturer.

Founded in 1960, it has traditionally been overshadowed by larger companies like Pitsos and Izola. However, while traditional local competitors have either been acquired by foreign companies or gone out of business altogether, ELCO managed to survive, focusing on manufacture of kitchen ovens and heaters, claiming a fair share in the Greek market.

Today it is further supported by its trading activity, covering a wide range of appliances, for example Elco Robot.

== References/External links ==
- L.S. Skartsis, "Modern Greece's Machines: A Comprehensive Guide to Greek Vehicle & Machine Manufacturers (1700 to Present)" (2026) ISBN 978-618-00-6734-7 (eBook)
- Company website
