= ATCOM =

ATCOM may refer to:

- United States Army Aviation and Troop Command
- Atcom S.A., an Athens based, software company
