= Evga S.A =

Greek dairy producer

EVGA - EMFI S.A. ΕΒΓΑ - EMFI Α.Ε.
- Company type: Private
- Industry: Dairy, pastry
- Founded: 1934
- Headquarters: Athens, Greece
- Products: Croissants, Ice cream, Parbaking
- Owner: Algida (The Magnum Ice Cream Company)
- Website: evgapastries.gr

Evga S.A. (Greek: ΕΒΓΑ) is a Greek dairy product producer, with headquarters in the center of Athens, founded in 1934. The company produces ice cream, juices, croissants and frozen pastry products. EVGA exports to Europe and the United States, and produces products for third-party companies.

== History ==
- In 1936 EVGA became the first company to produce standardised ice-cream in the Greek market.
- In 1988 the company joined the K. Filippou group and invested in mechanical equipment and manpower. It started producing juices and frozen bakery products. In 1991 EVGA started producing pasteurised juices under the Refresh brand. In 1995 the company launched 0%+0%, ice cream with no fat or sugar and later sugar-free chocolate, and a range of long-life Refresh juices.
- EVGA won the 1996 Sial D’Or award for 0%+0% product line. BVQI certified EVGA according to ISO 9002 in 1996, and to ISO 9001 in 1997.
- On 1 January 1999 the company merged with Folie Croissants, with the new name European Milk and Flour Industry. In 2001 the company acquired the Greek ice-cream and dessert manufacturing company and retail chain IGLOO. In 2006 the Company renewed the EVGA logo.
- In 2010, Unilever and EVGA decided to collaborate in the Greek Ice Cream Sector.

== See also ==
- List of companies in Greece
- Delta S.A.
- Fage
