= Apostolos Pitsos =

Greek industrialist and businessman (1918–2023)

- Απόστολος Πίτσος
- Born: 29 June 1918; Ampelokipoi, Athens, Kingdom of Greece
- Died: 1 January 2023 (aged 104); Psychiko, Greece
- Citizenship: Greece
- Education: German School of Athens
- Occupations: Industrialist; businessman
- Employer: Pitsos
- Title: CEO of Pitsos
- Spouse: Eni
- Children: 2
- Website: pitsos.gr

Apostolos Pitsos (Greek: Απόστολος Πίτσος; 29 June 1918 – 1 January 2023) was a Greek industrialist and businessman.

== Early years ==
Pitsos was born on 29 June 1918 in the Ampelokipoi neighbourhood of Athens. He grew up there and studied at the German School of Athens where in the third grade his classmate was future Prime Minister Georgios Rallis. From a young age, he worked in the family business Pitsos.

After school, in 1937, he went to Aue, Germany, where he studied mechanical engineering. At the beginning of the Greco-Italian War, he returned to Greece and went to the anti-aircraft artillery based in Menidi.

== Career ==
After the end of the war, having knowledge in engineering, Pitsos upgraded his family's small handicraft to the well-known electrical company Pitsos. He implemented the idea of constructing modern factory facilities in Renti.

In 1977, it started working with Siemens. The Bosch-Siemens Hausgeräte GmbH group acquired 60% of the Greek company while Siemens S.A. Hellas acquired 20%. The arrival of investors put the company on an upward trajectory.

In 1989, the production of No Frost refrigerators started and in 1994, it started exporting kitchens to Scandinavia. In 1996, the company was renamed BSP S.A. and later BSH Home Appliances S.A. in 2002.

== Personal life and death ==
Pitsos married Eleni Maria "Eni" (b. 1939) and they had two children, Konstantinos (b. 1962), and Katerina (b. 1965).

He turned 100 on 29 June 2018. He received two doses of the COVID-19 vaccine in 2021.

He died peacefully at his home, in Psychiko, on 1 January 2023, aged 104.
