= Olympos (company) =

Greek dairy products company

Olympos Όλυμπος
- Type: Private
- Founded: 1965 (Larisa, Greece)
- Headquarters: Trikala, Greece
- Products: dairy, yogurt, Greek yogurt, cheese
- Website: www.olympos.gr

Olympos (Greek: Όλυμπος) is the name of a Greek dairy products company based in Trikala, Thessalia.

It was founded in 1965 by an agricultural cooperation in Larissa with the support of Agrotiki Bank.

In 2000 the company changed ownership and its industrial base was transferred to Trikala.

As of 2018, it holds the second place of sales on dairy products in the Greek market with exports to 34 countries.
