= Kioleides =

Vehicle manufacturer

N. Kioleides SA
- Trade name: Kioleides
- Native name: Νικ.Κιολεϊδης Α.Ε.Β.Ε.
- Type: industrial
- Founded: 1968
- Founder: Kioleides family
- Headquarters: Athens, Greece
- Area served: North Europe (Greece)
- Key people: Nikolaos Kioleides, Michael Kioleides
- Services: Trailer Manufacturer
- Number of employees: ▼250 (2015)
- Website: https://nktrailers.gr/en/

N. Kioleides is the largest Greek manufacturer of trailers (civilian and military) and truck bodies with successful exports to several countries. It was founded in 1968. A company division is exclusively responsible for the production of a large variety of railroad cars, passenger and freight with significant contracts with Hellenic Railways. In 1999 production started in the company's new modern factory in Volos.

In 2021, a company division, NK Trailers, signed an agreement with China's Zonson Smart Auto, regarding the licence production of electric trucks and buses in the company's factory in Volos.

== Gallery ==
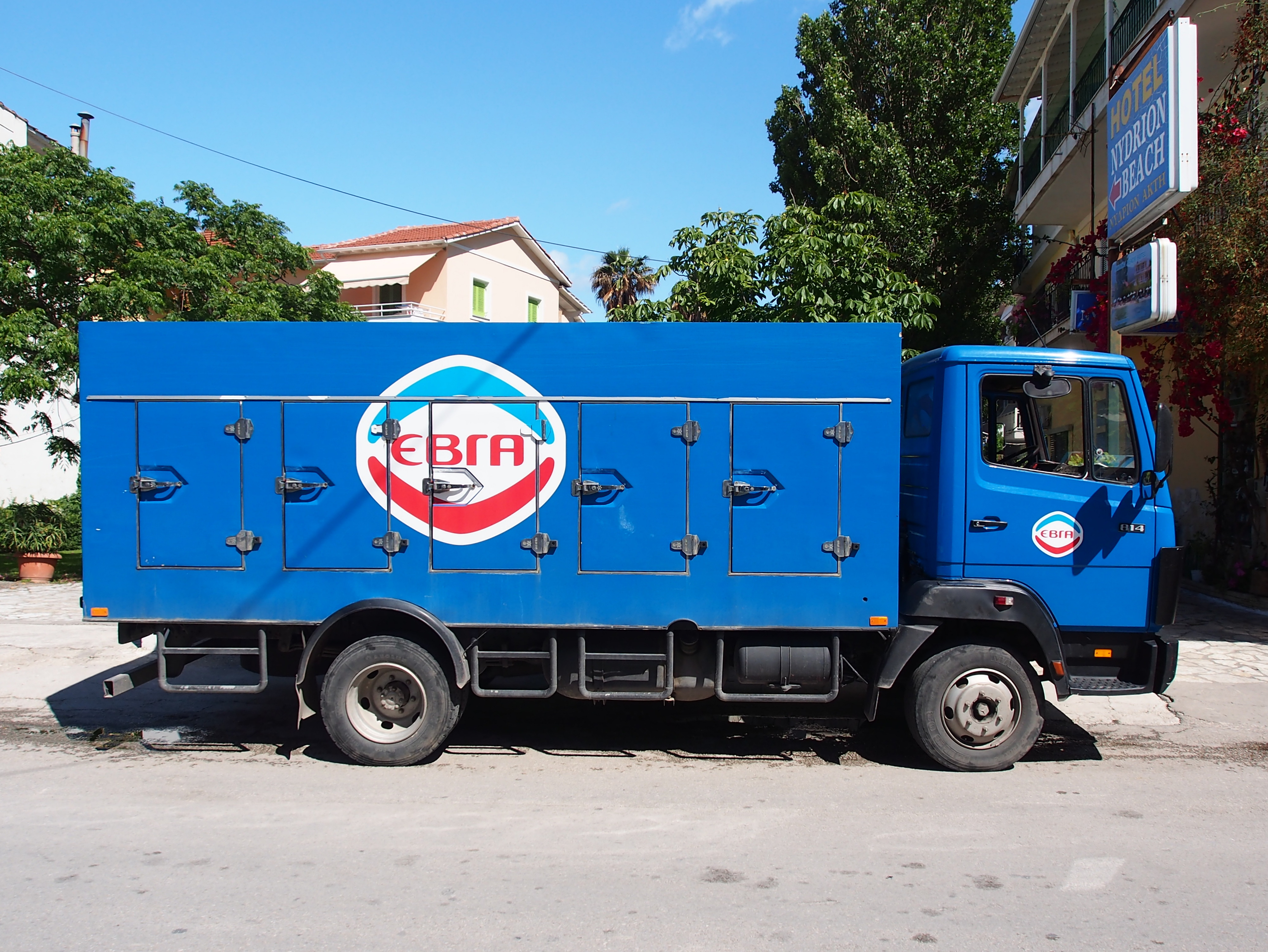
Ice cooling truck by N.Kioleides

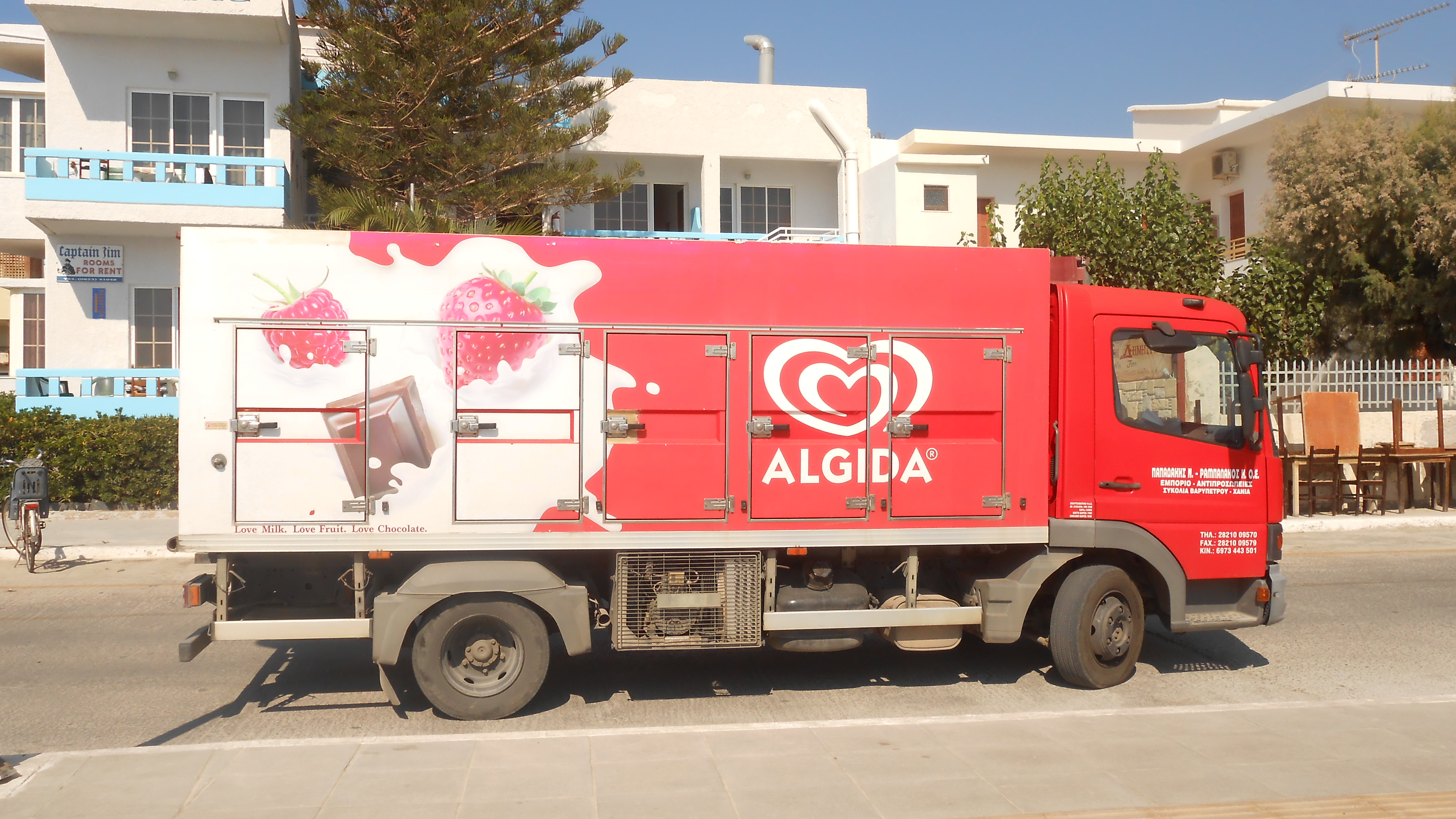
Ice cooling truck for the ice company Algida by N.Kioleides

== Sources ==
- Home page
- Electric vehicles (company website)
- Agreement for vehicle manufacture (under Zonson license)

== See also ==
- List of companies in Greece
