= Berios =

Construction companies

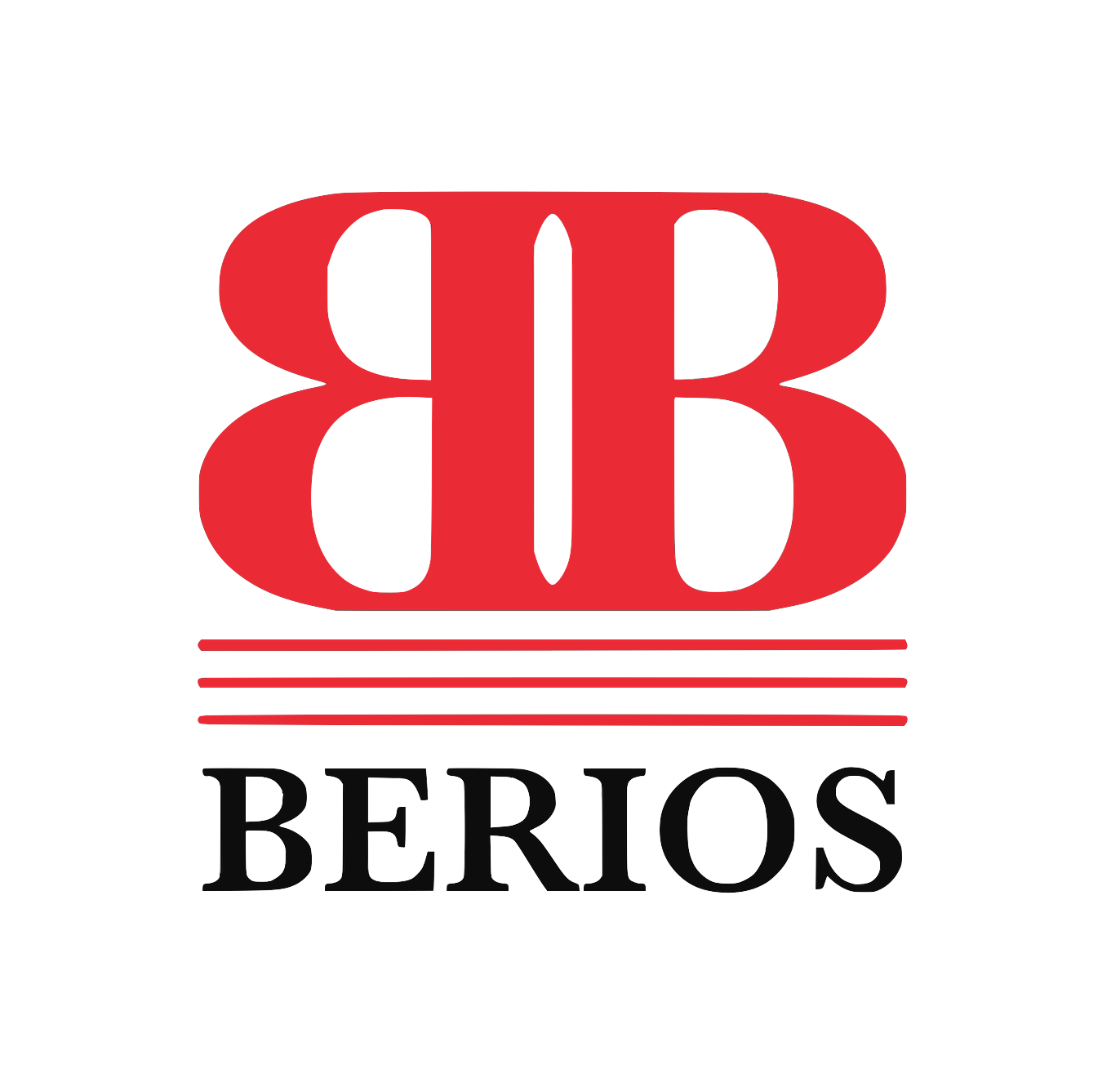
- Company type: Privately held company
- Industry: Civil Engineering; Construction; Project Management
- Founded: 1984
- Headquarters: Athens, Greece; Abu Dhabi, UAE
- Area served: Europe; Middle East; North Africa
- Key people: Nikolaos K. Berios (Founder and CEO)
- Website: berios.com

Berios (Greek: Μπέριος; Arabic: بيريوس) is the name used to collectively refer to Berios S.A. (located in Athens, Greece) and Berios Ltd. (located in Abu Dhabi, UAE), which are both construction/civil engineering companies that were founded by Nikolaos K. Berios. Berios specializes in the civil engineering analysis, construction, and project management of detail-oriented private buildings.

== History ==
=== Nikolaos Berios (1984 - 1989) ===
The company was founded in 1984 by Nikolaos Berios as an independent civil engineering company. For the first years after its inception Berios was engaged in the study and supervision of small private projects in Athens, Greece. In 1989 the company's activities were expanded to include project and construction management.

=== Dritsas-Berios (1989 - 2010) ===
In 1989 the company was converted into a Limited Company (Ltd.), having now two equally liable members, Nikolaos Berios and Ioannis Dritsas, and was consequently renamed Dritsas-Berios. In 1999 the firm's offices were relocated from Athens’ province of Nea Filadelfia to 90 Kifissias Avenue in Maroussi-Athens; this was a much-needed step for the facilitation of the company's steady growth. In 2001 the company was converted from Limited (Ltd.) to Société Anonyme (S.A.), with each of the two shareholders owning 50% of the total shares.

=== Berios S.A. (2010 to present) ===
In 2010 the entirety of Ioannis Dritsas’ shares were acquired by Nikolaos Berios, who thereby became the sole shareholder of the company, which was thus renamed Berios S.A.. During this period the company's activity grew considerably, undertaking projects both throughout Greece and abroad. The economic crisis that hit Greece in 2009 crippled more than any other industry the construction sector: by 2011 the construction activity in the country had decreased by almost 40%, causing a large number of civil engineering and construction companies to declare bankruptcy. In order to combat the strenuous economic conditions and avoid a halt in the company's continued growth, Berios Ltd. was established in 2012 in Nicosia, Cyprus, with the goal to expand Berios’ activities to the United Arab Emirates.

=== Berios Ltd. - United Arab Emirates (2013 to present) ===
In 2013 new offices were established in the Etihad Towers of Abu Dhabi. The company expanded its activities to include interior design and architectural studies. In 2016 an additional office location was established in UAE, located in Dubai's Business Bay.

== Projects ==
The majority of projects Berios engages in are office buildings that range from 1,200 m^{2} up to 40,000 m^{2}, and luxury residences that range from 500 m^{2} to 6,000 m^{2}. However, the company has often undertaken industrial, transportation, and marine construction projects, as well as special buildings such as churches, medical centers, and infrastructure works.

=== Notable Projects ===
- Olayan Group Headquarters in Glyfada-Athens, Greece
- Bold Ogilvy Headquarters in Gerakas-Athens, Greece
- Holy Temple of Panagia Faneromeni in Vouliagmeni-Athens, Greece
