= ELFE =

Greek Fertilizers and Chemicals ELFE SA
- Industry: Chemical
- Founded: 1961
- Headquarters: Palaio Faliro, Athens, Greece
- Products: Fertilizers, Technology and R&D.
- Revenue: ▲€ 147.8 million (2014)
- Net income: €-24.9 million (2014)

The Greek Fertilizers and Chemicals ELFE SA (Greek: Ελληνικά Λιπάσματα και Χημικά ELFE Α.Β.Ε.Ε.) is a fertilizer company operating in Greece. The company's offices are located in Athens.

The Phosphate Fertilizer Industry was established in 1961 as a subsidiary of the Emporiki Bank Group of Greece. The fertilizer factory southwest of Nea Karvali began operations in 1965. Then, in 2000, a merger of the company with the company Chemical Industries of Northern Greece SA was carried out. The merged entity was acquired in 2009 by ELFE SA and has since been named the Greek Fertilizers and Chemicals ELFE SA (Greek ELFE Fertilizers).

The fertilizer factory is located southwest of Nea Karvali, in Kavala, near the commercial port of Philip II.
