= Strained yogurt =

Yogurt thickened by draining whey

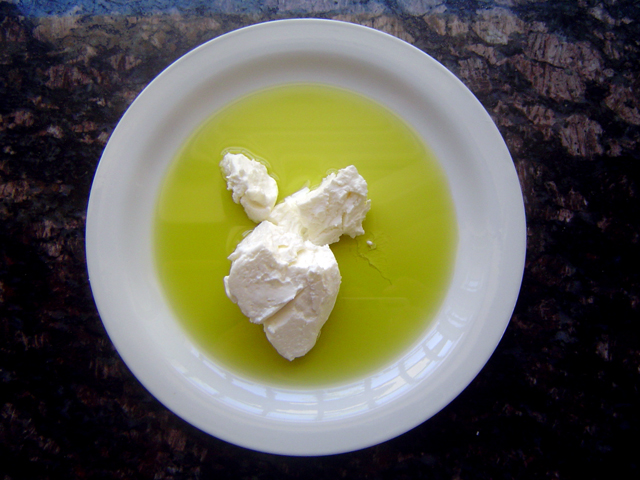
- Strained yogurt with olive oil
- Alternative names: Greek yogurt, chak(k)a, labneh, suzma, yogurt cheese
- Type: Fermented dairy product
- Region or state: Levant, West, South, and Central Asia; Middle East, Caucasus, Balkans, Eastern Europe
- Serving temperature: Cold
- Main ingredients: Yogurt
- Food energy (per 100 g serving): 133 kcal (560 kJ)

Strained yogurt, Labneh, Greek or Greek-style yogurt, yogurt cheese, sack yogurt, hung curd, or kerned yogurt is yogurt (or "yoghurt") that has been strained to remove most of its whey, making it thicker while preserving its sour taste. In Europe and North America, it is often made from low-fat or fat-free cow's milk. In Iceland a similar product named skyr is made. Labneh is a strained yogurt thicker than Greek yogurt.

Strained yogurt is usually marketed in North America as "Greek yogurt". In the United Kingdom, the term "Greek yoghurt" may only be used for yoghurt imported from Greece; strained yoghurt is sold as "Greek-style yoghurt", and yoghurt made creamy by thickening agents instead may also use this name, although ingredients must be declared. Strained yogurt is widely eaten in Balkan, Middle Eastern, Central Asian, and South Asian cuisines, where it is often used in cooking, as it curdles less readily when cooked. It is used in a variety of dishes, cooked or not, savory or sweet. Straining makes even non-fat yogurt varieties thicker, richer, and creamier than unstrained. Since straining removes the whey, more milk is required to make strained yogurt, increasing the production cost. In Western Europe and the United States, strained yogurt has increased in popularity compared to unstrained yogurt. Since the straining process removes some of the lactose, strained yogurt is lower in sugar than unstrained yogurt.

In 2012, most of the growth in the US$4.1 billion American yogurt industry came from the strained yogurt sub-segment, typically marketed as "Greek yogurt". In the US, there is no legal or standard definition of Greek yogurt, and yogurt thickened with thickening agents, typically pectin, locust bean gum, starches or guar gum, may be sold as "Greek yogurt".

== Name ==
In England, strained yogurt only became well known outside of immigrant communities in the 1980s, when it was imported into the United Kingdom by the Greek company Fage, under the brand name "Total". A court case in 2013 restricted the term "Greek yogurt" in the UK to strained yogurt made in Greece; it had only been used for non-Greek-made yoghurt once since the 1980s. Labneh, a word derived from Levantine Arabic, is made in the same way, but strained for longer and with added salt; it is sometimes termed "yogurt cheese".

== Geographical variations ==
=== Central Asia ===
In the cuisines of many Iranian and Turkic people (such as Afghan, Tajik, Tatar, Uzbek, and other Central Asian cuisines), a type of strained yogurt called chak(k)a or süzme is consumed. It is obtained by draining qatiq, a local yogurt variety. By further drying it one obtains qurut, a kind of dry fresh cheese.

=== The Middle East and the Mediterranean ===
Preparation of labneh

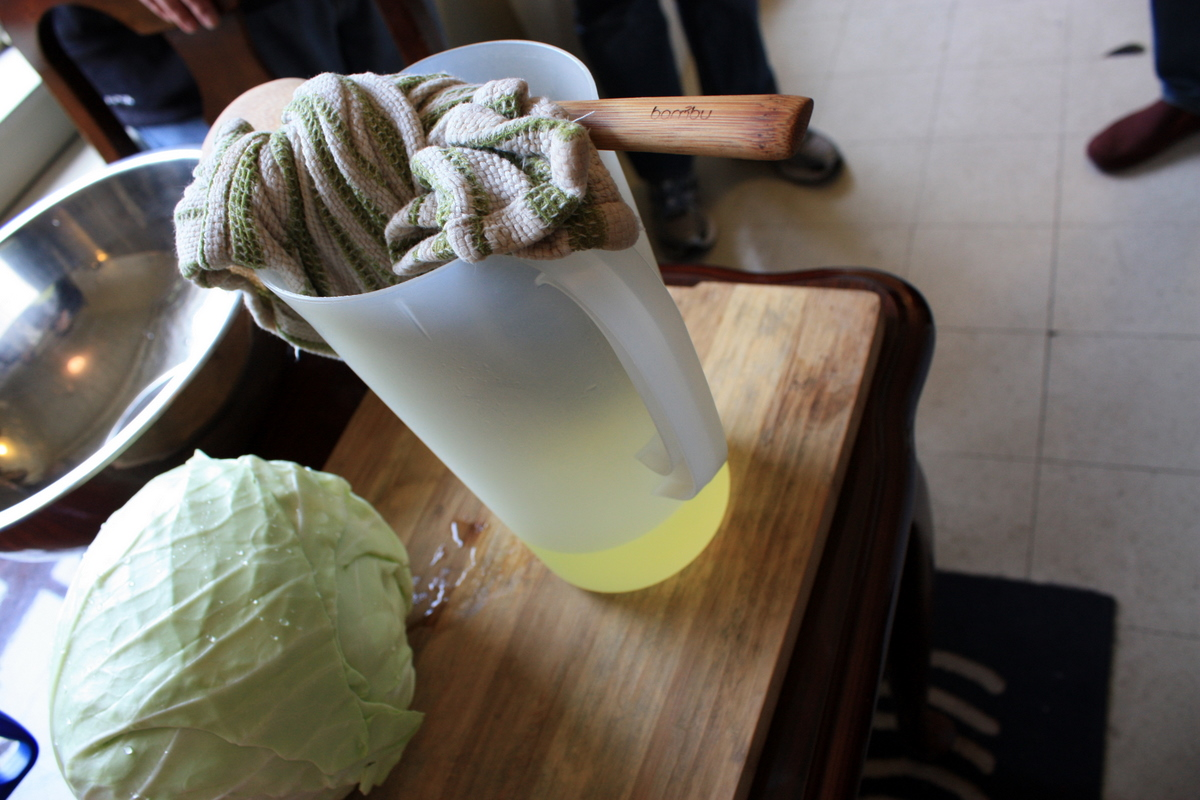
Yoghurt being drained of its whey using a cloth to create labneh, whey can be seen in the bottom of the container

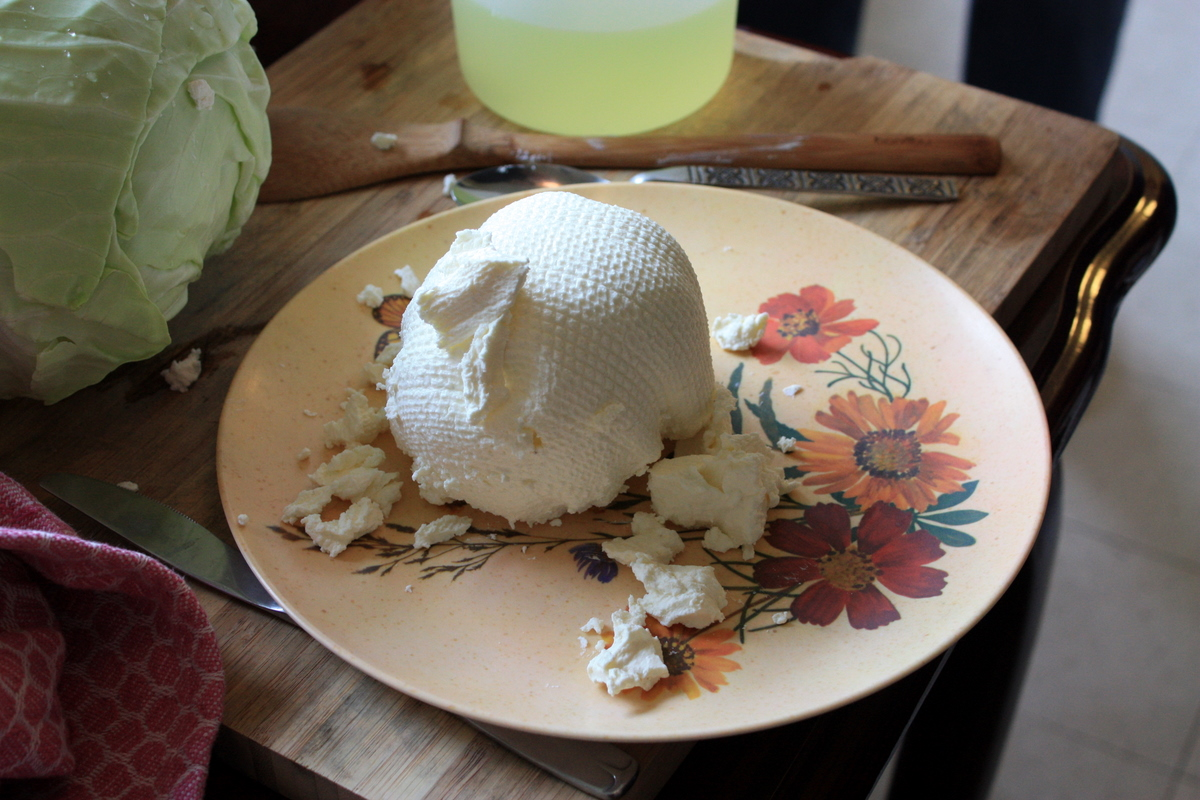
Labneh after being drained and removed from the cloth

Strained yogurt is made by straining the liquid out of yogurt until it takes on a consistency similar to a soft cheese. A strained yogurt that is thicker than Greek yogurt, and salted, is known as labneh or labaneh (labna, labni, labne, lebni, or labani; Arabic: لبنة) in the countries of the Levant, Egypt, and the Arabian Peninsula. Labaneh biz-zayt, 'labaneh in oil', consists of small balls of dry labneh, sometimes covered with herbs or spices, kept in olive oil, where it can be preserved for over a year. As it ages it turns more sour and has a deeper, more complex, umami, and fermented taste. The flavor depends largely on the sort of milk used: labneh from cow's milk has a rather mild flavor. The quality of the olive oil topping also influences the taste of labneh. Milk from camels and other mammals is used in labneh production in the Middle East.

==== The Levant ====
Labneh is a common mezze dish and sandwich ingredient, especially in the Levant. A common sandwich in the Middle East consists of labneh, mint, za'atar, and olive on flatbread. It is a common breakfast dip. It is usually eaten spread on a plate and drizzled with olive oil, and often dried mint. It is also often paired as a dip with the mixed herb blend za'atar. Bedouin also produce a dry, hard labneh (labaneh malboudeh, similar to Central Asian qurut) that can be stored; strained labneh is pressed in a cheesecloth and dried out. In Lebanon and Palestine, labneh is rolled into balls and preserved by storing them in olive oil; the balls are sometimes flavored by coating them with herbs and spices such as za'atar, sumac, sesame seeds, nigella seeds, or dried chili flakes. These balls that are preserved in olive oil are commonly known as Labneh Mka'zaleh, Labneh Mda'baleh, or Labneh Mdaḥbaleh.

==== Armenia ====
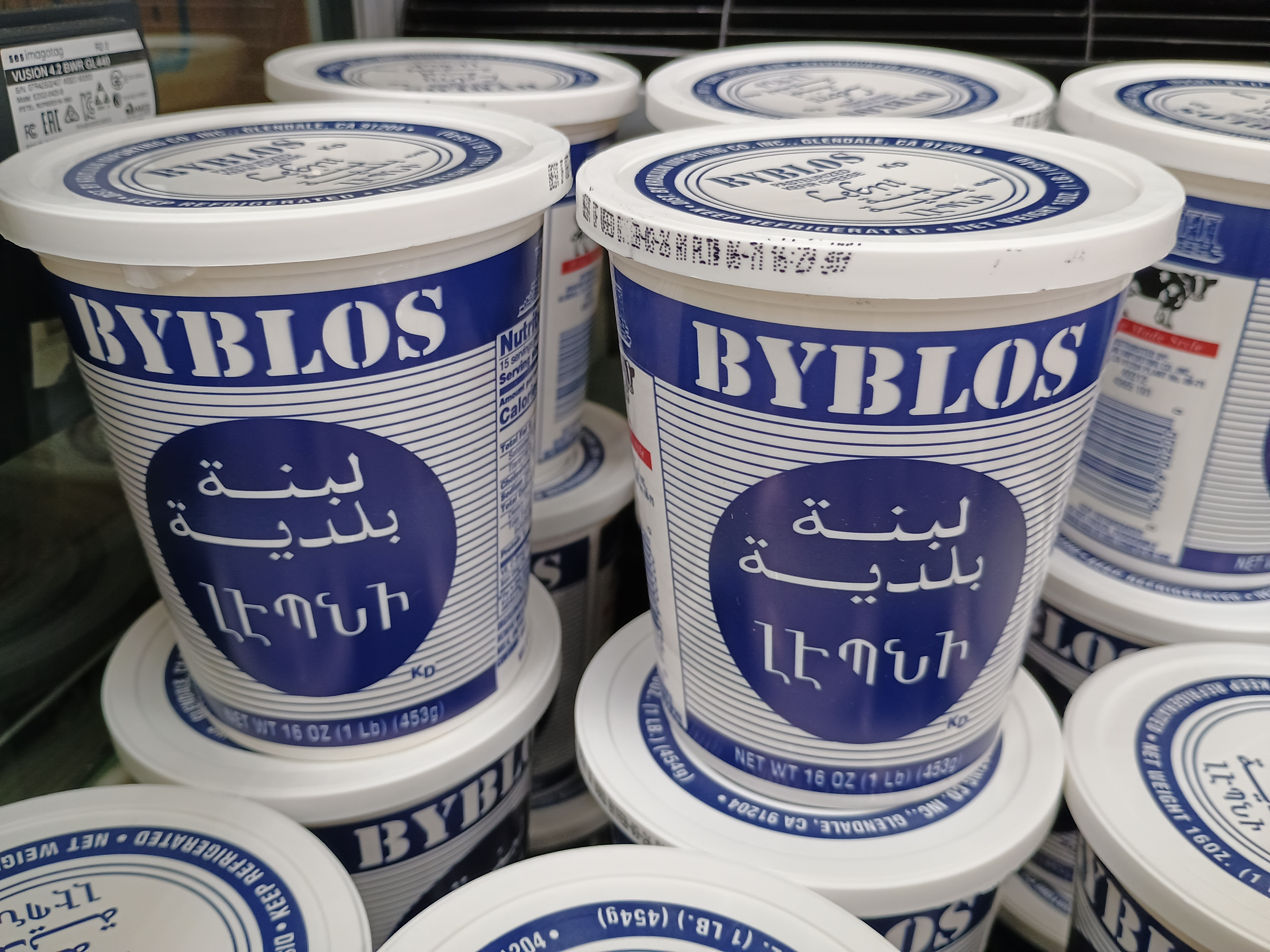
Lebni in the US with English, Armenian and Arabic text

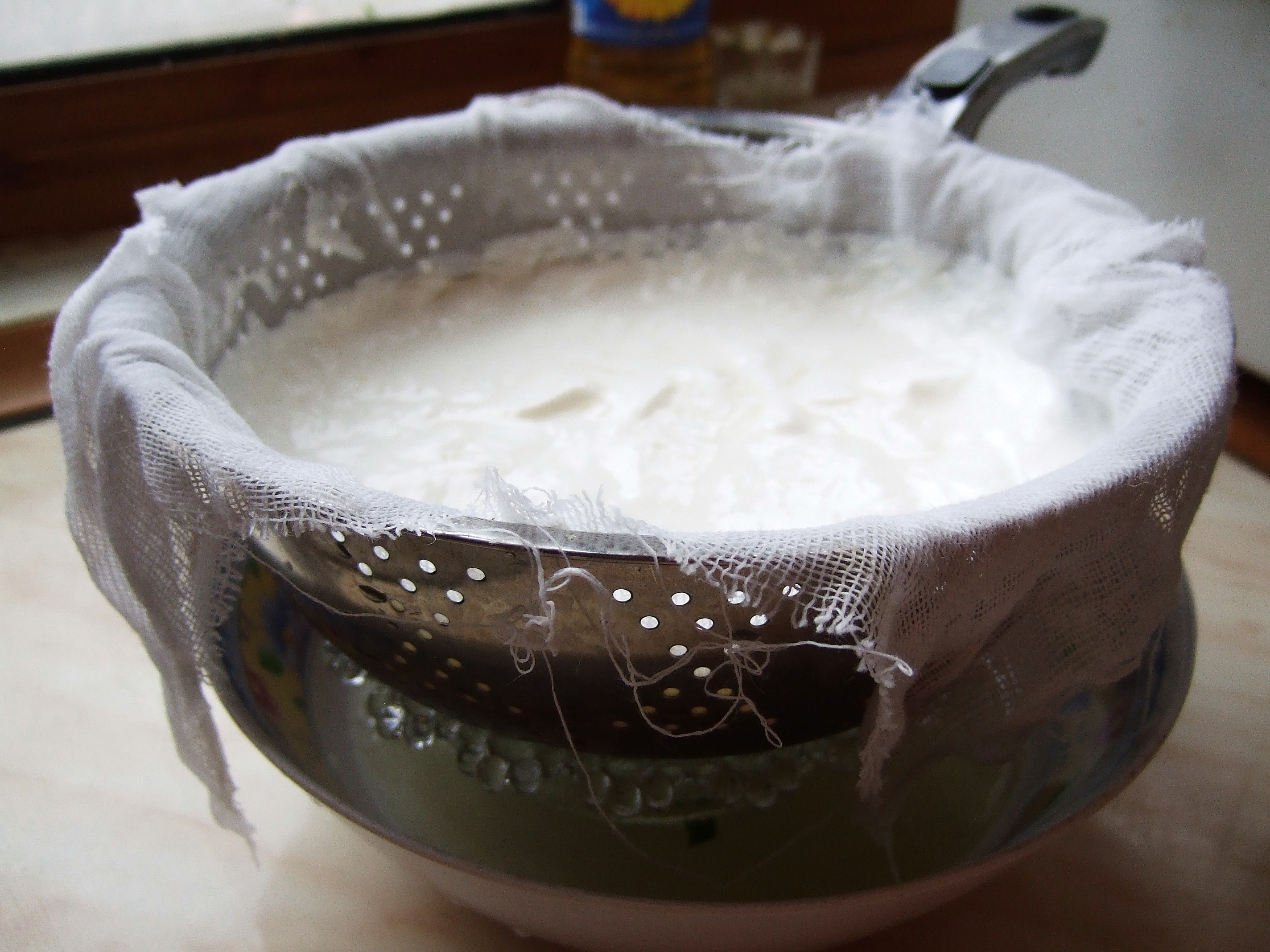
Yogurt being strained through cheesecloth

In Armenia, strained yogurt is called kamats matzoon. Traditionally, it was produced for long-term preservation by draining matzoon in cloth sacks.

==== Egypt ====
In Egypt, it is eaten with savory accompaniments such as olives and oil, and also with a sweetener such as honey, as a snack or breakfast food. Areesh cheese (or arish; Egyptian Arabic: جبنة قريش, gibna quraysh) is a type of cheese that originated in Egypt. Arish cheese is made from yogurt heated slowly until it curdles and separates, then placed in cheesecloth to drain. It is similar in taste to ricotta. The protein content of Areesh cheese is 17.6%. Shanklish (شنكليش), a fermented cheese, is made from areesh cheese.

==== Cyprus ====
As in Greece, strained yogurt is widely used in Cypriot cuisine both as an ingredient in recipes as well as on its own or as a supplement to a dish. In Cyprus, strained yogurt is usually made from sheep or goats milk.

==== Iran ====
Strained yogurt in Iran is called mâst chekide and is usually used for making dips, or served as a side dish. In Northern Iran, mâst chekide is a variety of kefir with a distinct sour taste. It is usually mixed with fresh herbs in a pesto-like purée called delal. Yogurt is a side dish to many Iranian meals. Strained yogurt is used as dips and various appetizers with multitudes of ingredients, including cucumbers, onions, shallots, fresh herbs (dill, spearmint, parsley, cilantro), spinach, walnuts, zereshk, and garlic. The best-known appetizers are spinach or eggplant borani, mâst-o-khiâr with cucumber, spring onions and herbs, or mâst-musir with wild shallots. Strained yogurt in Balochistan is called sheelanch.

==== Turkey ====
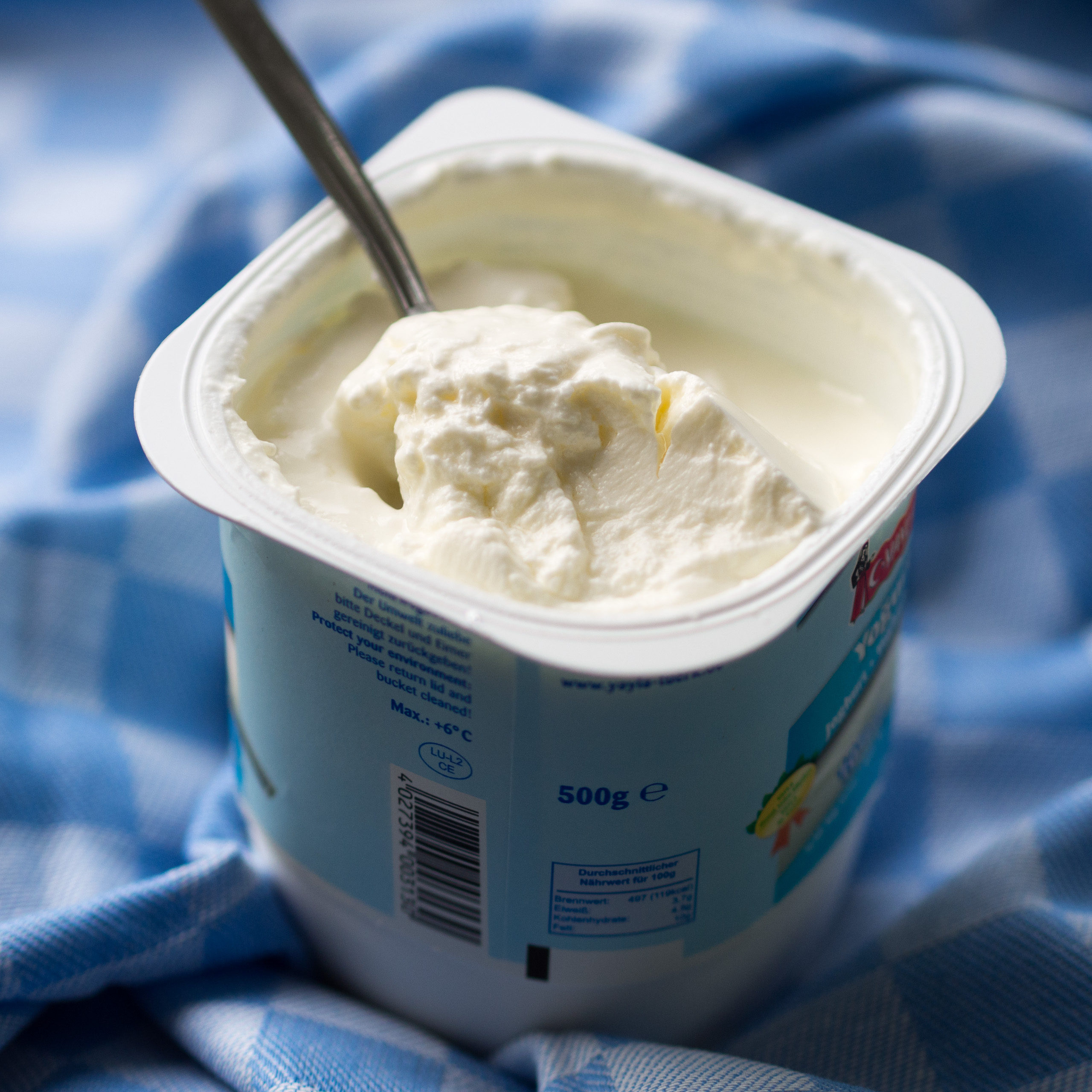
Unstirred Turkish süzme yoğurt (strained yogurt), with a 10 percent fat content

In Turkey, strained yogurt is known as süzme yoğurt ('strained yogurt') or kese yoğurdu ('bag yogurt'). Water is sometimes added in the preparation of cacık that is not eaten as a meze but consumed as a beverage. Strained yogurt is used in Turkish mezes and dips such as haydari. In Turkish markets, labne is also a common dairy product, but it is different from strained yogurt; it is yogurt-based creamy cheese without salt, and is used like mascarpone.

=== South Asia ===
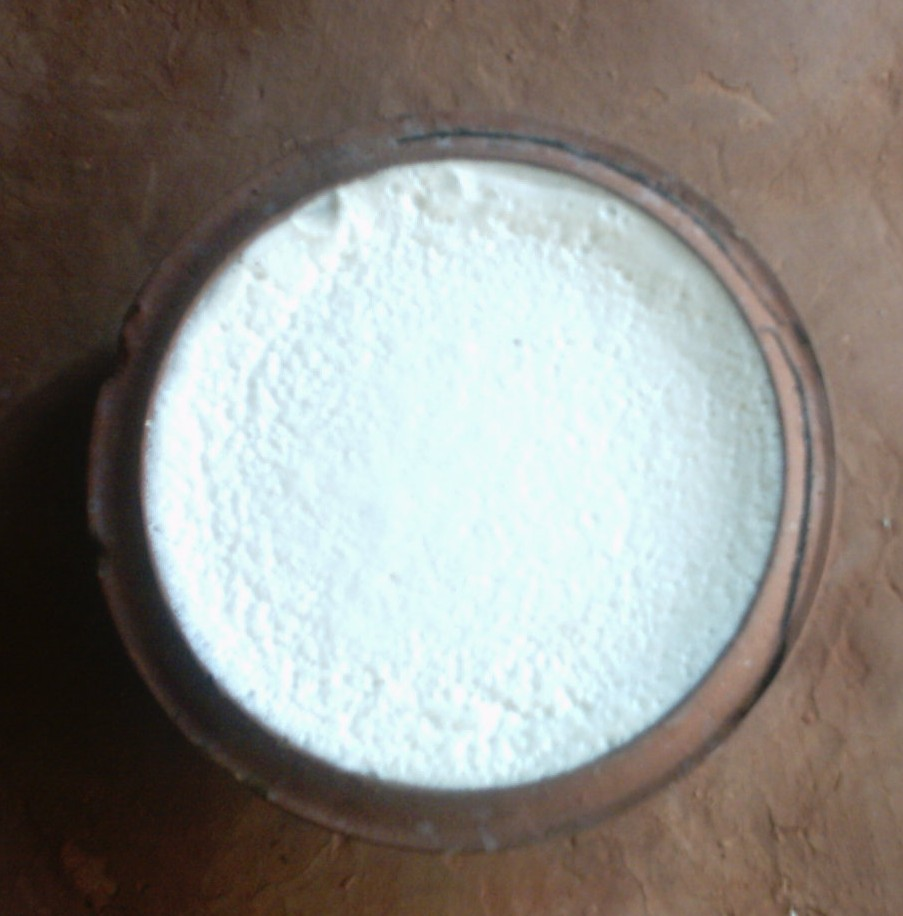
A disposable clay pot with dahi

Strained yogurt called chakka is made by draining the yogurt in a (preferably muslin) cloth. It is hung for 12 to 18 hours to allow some of the whey to drain off. This technique is frequently used in India and Pakistan. Shrikhand is a dish made with chakka, sugar, saffron, cardamom, and pureed or diced fruit and nuts mixed in; it is often eaten with poori. It is particularly common in the Indian states of Gujarat and Maharashtra. Chakka is also eaten in Pashtun-dominated regions of Pakistan with rice and meat dishes.

=== Southeastern Europe ===
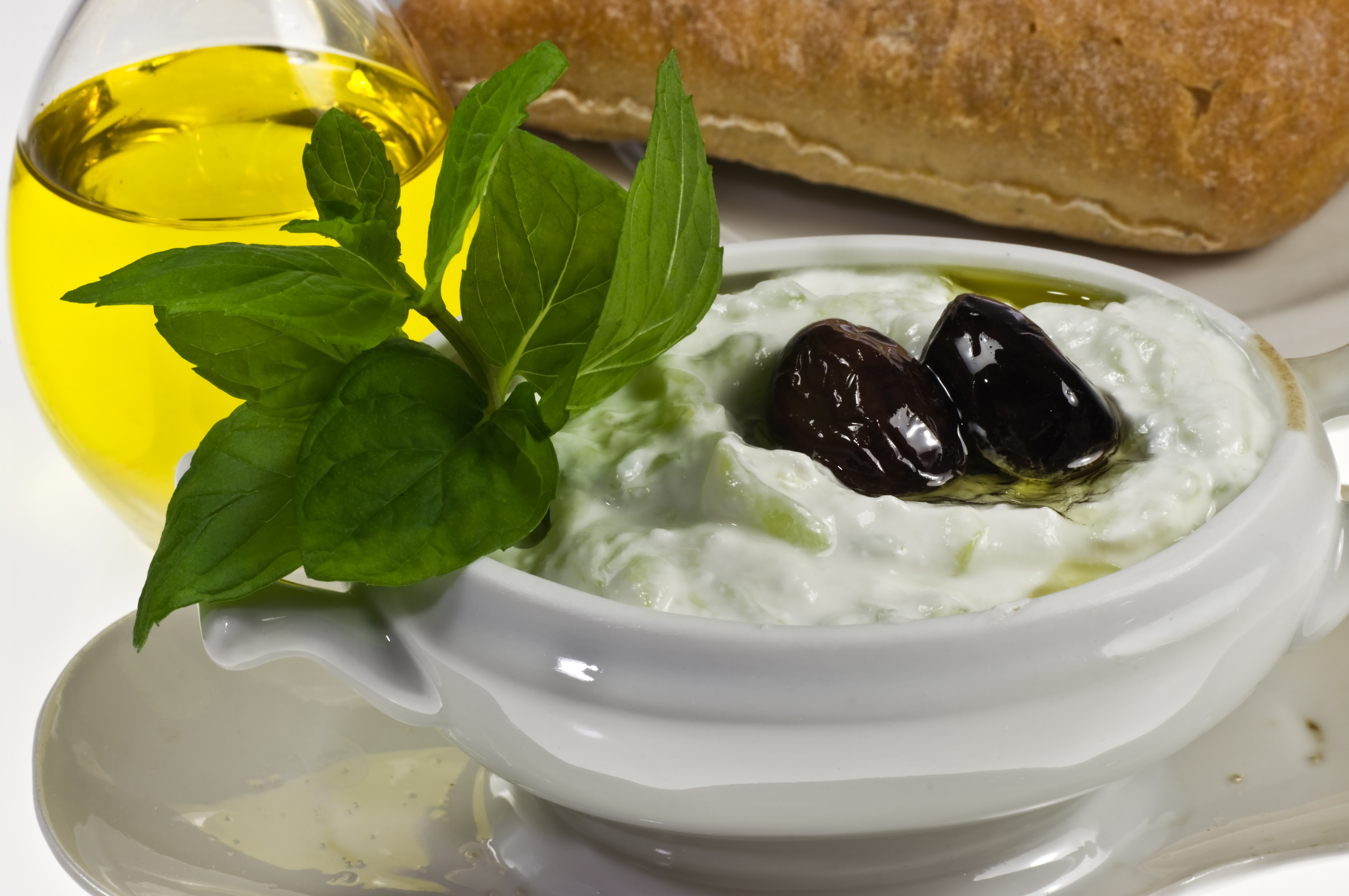
Tzatziki, a common meze in Greece

Strained yogurt (Greek: στραγγιστό γιαούρτι, romanized: strangistó giaoúrti) is used in Greek food mostly as the base for tzatziki dip and as a dessert, with honey, sour cherry syrup, or spoon sweets often served on top. A few savory Greek dishes also use strained yogurt. In Greece, strained yogurt, like yogurt in general, is traditionally made from sheep's milk. Fage International S.A. began straining cow's-milk yogurt for industrial production in Greece in 1975, when it launched its brand "Total".

In Albania, strained yogurt is called salcë kosi. Yogurt is drained in a cloth sack for a few hours to overnight. The water released from this process is called hirrë and can be used to preserve cheese or as a drink.

In Bulgaria, where yogurt is considered to be an integral part of the national cuisine, strained yogurt is called tsedeno kiselo mliako (Bulgarian: цедено кисело мляко) and is used in a variety of salads and dressings.

A variety of strained yogurt called basa is a traditional variety of cheese from the region of Lika in Croatia. In Serbia and North Macedonia, it is also known as kiselo mleko (кисело млеко).

=== Northern Europe ===
A type of strained yogurt named ymer is available in Denmark. In contrast to the Greek variety, only a minor amount of whey is drained off in the production process.

Strained yogurt is known as hangop, literally meaning 'hang up' in the Netherlands. It is a traditional dessert. Hangop may also be made using buttermilk.

=== United Kingdom ===
In the UK, strained yogurt can only be marketed as "Greek" if made in Greece. Strained cow-milk yogurt not made in Greece is typically sold as "Greek style" or "Greek recipe" for marketing reasons, typically at lower prices than yogurt made in Greece. Among "Greek style" yogurts, there is no distinction between those thickened by straining and those thickened through additives. However, if the yogurt contains anything other than lactic products, food enzymes and micro-organism cultures a list of ingredients is required on packaging.

In September 2012, Chobani UK began to sell yogurt made in the United States as "Greek yogurt". FAGE, a company that manufactures yogurt in Greece and sells it in the United Kingdom, filed a passing-off claim against Chobani in the UK High Court, claiming that UK consumers understood "Greek" to refer to the country of origin (similar to "Belgian beer"); Chobani's position was that consumers understood "Greek" to refer to a preparation (similar to "French toast"). Both companies relied on surveys to prove their point; FAGE also relied on the previous industry practice of UK yogurt makers not to label their yogurt as "Greek yogurt". Ultimately Mr Justice Briggs found in favor of FAGE and granted an injunction preventing Chobani from using the name "Greek yogurt". In February 2014, this decision was upheld on appeal. Greece may now seek to protect the marketing term, "Greek yogurt", across the entire EU under protected designation of origin rules.

In May 2020, British dairy company Yeo Valley entered the market with an organic product called "Super Thick Kerned Yogurt. The "kerned yogurt" label was the first of its kind, coined in reference to an archaic Somerset term meaning "thickened", which is predominantly used in relation to dairy products.

A product called "Lindahls Kvarg" was launched in the UK by Nestlé in 2018, and described as "Sweden's No. 1 Quark". Quark is a type of high-protein strained curd cheese widely used in Swedish cooking. The company Bio-tiful launched its kefir-quark blend, containing live cultures and protein.

Since 2015, Arla has sold its own skyr product marketed as "Icelandic style yogurt".

=== North America ===
In Mexico, the thick yogurt jocoque seco was popularized by local producers of Lebanese origin. Although the original jocoque is typical to the Altos de Jalisco region. The name may have been used by Lebanese and Syrian immigrants given its pre-existence in 19th century Mexico.

Strained yogurt typically marketed as "Greek yogurt" has become popular in the United States and Canada, where it is often used as a lower-calorie substitute for sour cream or crème fraîche. Celebrity chef Graham Kerr became an early adopter of strained yogurt as an ingredient, frequently featuring it (and demonstrating how to strain plain yogurt through a coffee filter) on his eponymous 1990 cooking show, as frequently as he had featured clarified butter on The Galloping Gourmet in the late 1960s. In 2015, food market research firm Packaged Facts reported that Greek yogurt has a 50 percent share of the yogurt market in the United States.

There are numerous "Greek yogurt" brands in North America. Fage began importing its Greek products in 1998 and opened a domestic production plant in Johnstown, New York, in 2008. Chobani, based in New Berlin, New York, began marketing its Greek-style yogurt in 2007. The Voskos brand entered the US market in 2009 with imported Greek yogurt products at 10%, 2%, and 0% milkfat. Stonyfield Farms, owned by Groupe Danone, introduced Oikos Organic Greek Yogurt in 2007; Danone began marketing a non-organic Dannon Oikos Greek Yogurt in 2011 and also produced a now discontinued blended Greek-style yogurt under the Activia Selects brand; Dannon Light & Fit Greek nonfat yogurt was introduced in 2012, and Activia Greek yogurt was re-introduced in 2013. General Mills introduced a Greek-style yogurt under the Yoplait brand name in early 2010, which was discontinued and replaced by Yoplait Greek 100 in August 2012. Activia Greek yogurt was re-introduced in 2013, and in July 2012 took over US distribution and sales of Canadian Liberté's Greek brands. In Canada, Yoplait was launched in January 2013, and is packaged with toppings.

== Production ==
While yogurt may legally be described as "strained", modern commercial production does not usually reduce the liquid content by passing the yogurt through a filter under gravity, the usual definition of straining. The characteristic thick texture and high protein content are achieved through either or both of two processing steps. The milk may be concentrated by ultrafiltration to remove a portion of the water before addition of yogurt cultures. Alternatively, after culturing, the yogurt may be centrifuged or membrane-filtered to remove whey, in a process analogous to the traditional straining step. Brands described as "strained" yogurt, including Activia Greek, Chobani, Dannon Light & Fit Greek, Dannon Oikos, FAGE, Stonyfield Organic Oikos, Trader Joe's, and Yoplait, have undergone the second process. Process details are highly guarded trade secrets. Other brands of Greek-style yogurt, including Yoplait and some store brands, are made by adding milk protein concentrate and thickeners to standard yogurt to boost the protein content and modify the texture.

The liquid resulting from straining yogurt is called "acid whey" and is composed of water, yogurt cultures, protein, a slight amount of lactose, and lactic acid. It is costly to dispose of. Farmers have used the whey to mix with animal feed and fertilizer. Using anaerobic digesters, it can be a source of methane that can be used to produce electricity.

== Nutrition ==
Strained yogurt is a good source of protein, calcium, iodine, and vitamin B12. The straining process, which removes liquid whey and lactose, yields higher protein content. The FAO standard requires yogurt to have at least 5.6% protein content if strained, otherwise 2.7%. Strained yogurt has less sugar content than other yogurts.

=== Vitamins ===
Yogurt is a rich source of dietary minerals, with calcium, magnesium, potassium, phosphorus, and zinc higher in content than in milk. One negative aspect of strained yogurt is that there is greater vitamin loss through the straining process than typical yogurt; in particular, the water-soluble vitamins: vitamin C, thiamin, riboflavin, niacin, pantothenic acid, biotin, folic acid, and vitamin B12 as well as vitamin A in its beta-carotene form can be lost through the straining of liquid whey from yogurt.

=== Macronutrients ===
There are no standard regulations in the market to monitor or control the composition of concentrated yogurts. Carbohydrate, fat and protein contents in strained yogurts varied from 1–12, 0–20, and 3.3–11 grams per 100 grams. Concentrated yogurts contain higher final total solid content than regular yogurts, possibly prolonging shelf life compared to regular yogurts.

== See also ==
- List of dairy products
