= List of electric power companies in Greece =

This is a list of every electric power company producing electrical energy in Greece as of March 2007.

== Public Power Corporation of Greece ==
The PPC S.A. (ΔΕΗ) is the biggest electric power company in Greece. It owns and operates 34 major thermal and hydroelectric power plants and 3 aeolic parks of the interconnected power grid of the mainland, as well as 60 autonomous power plants located on Crete, Rhodes and other Greek islands (33 thermal, 2 hydroelectric, 18 aeolic and 5 photovoltaic parks).

The total installed capacity of PPC's 97 power plants is 12276 MW with a net generation of 52.9 TWh in 2005.

=== PPC ===
- PPC Renewables S.A
  - 1. PPC Renewable-C.ROKAS S.A.I.C. - 52.7% of C.ROKAS is now owned by Iberdrola (see below).
  - 2. PPC Renewable-TERNA Energy S.A. - In cooperation with TERNA S.A. (GEK Group) (see below).
  - 3. PPC Renewable-DIEKAT Energy S.A.
  - 4. PPC Renewable-MEK Energy S.A.
- PPC RHODES S.A. (ex KOZEN HELLAS S.A.)
- PPC CRETE S.A.

== Thessaloniki Energy S.A. ==
Thessaloniki Energy S.A. is a subsidiary of Hellenic Petroleum. So far it owns and operates one thermoelectric power station fueled with natural gas of 390 MW installed capacity in Thessaloniki and aims to build two more of the same size and reach 1200 MW in total.

== Terna S.A. ==
Terna is part of the GEK Terna group. It operates through two subsidiaries in the energy sector.

=== Terna Energy S.A. ===
Terna Energy S.A. is actively involved in wind (Aeolian) power generation. It is one of the first private Greek companies ever to be involved in Renewable Energy Sources and has been licensed for more than 600 MW.

=== Heron S.A. ===
Terna is involved in power generation from thermal units through its subsidiary Heron S.A., which is licensed for the construction and operation of thermoelectric power stations fuelled with natural gas. Heron owns and operates a 147 MW gas fired power plant in Viotia which is designed to cover the system's reserve needs, as well as the needs in periods of high demand, over the following years. The total investment in this project reached 80 million euros. Also, Heron S.A. is registered for another 400 MW power plant, budgeted up to 220 million euros. This project is under development.

== Protergia ==
Protergia, a subsidiary of Mytilineos Holdings, operates 1.2 GW of power generation facilities, including the 444.48 MW Agios Nikolaos power plant in Viotia, a 436.6 MW power plant, owned by Korinthos Power, at Agioi Theodoroi, a 334 MW power plant, owned by Aluminium of Greece, in Viotia. It also operates 54 MW of wind and solar facilities.

== Enelco S.A. ==
Founded on 16 September 1999. Main shareholders of Enelco are:

1. 75%, Enel
2. 25%, Prometheus Gas, of Copelouzos Group and the Russian gas company Gazprom

Enelco has submitted to the Regulatory Authority for Energy three applications for Generation Authorisations for Elefsina (Attiki), Levadia (Viotia) and Evros (Thrace) locations. Each power plant will be of 360-390 MW capacity and will be fuelled by natural gas. Two of whom (Evros, Levadia) have been already awarded to it.

== C.Rokas S.A. ==
C.Rokas S.A. is an electric power company in Greece, that produces electricity from renewable energy sources. So far, it owns and operates wind farms with combined installed capacity of 193.3 MW, which produce annually over 525 GWh.

The main shareholder of C.Rokas S.A. is the Spanish electric power company Iberdrola with a percentage of 52.7%.

== Korinthos Power S.A. ==
Korinthos Power is a subsidiary of Mytilineos Holdings (65%) and Motor Oil Hellas (35%). It operates 436.6 MW power plant at Agioi Theodoroi.

== See also ==
- Energy in Greece
