= Research Academic Computer Technology Institute =

Research institute in Greece

The Research Academic Computer Technology Institute - RACTI (Greek: Ερευνητικό Ακαδημαϊκό Ινστιτούτο Τεχνολογίας Υπολογιστών), also known as the Computer Technology Institute (CTI), is a research institute in Greece under supervision of the Hellenic Ministry of Education. Its headquarters are located in Patras, Greece. The institute carries out technical and social research, develops training, and assists government and civil society institutions in information technology matters.

== History ==
CTI began in 1985 in Patras as the “Computer Technology Institute”. It was founded as a non profit Private Legal Entity (“NPID” under Greek Law) under presidential decree, 9/1985, supervised by the General Secretariat of Research and Technology, under the Ministry of Development.

Since 1992 it is supervised by the Ministry of Education and Religious Affairs, and constitutes an independent institution at the financial, administrative and scientific level. It was renamed as the Research Academic Computer Technology Institute (RA-CTI), according to Article 2 of Law 2909/2001 governing its operation.

In 2011 its name was changed to Computer Technology Institute and Press "DIOPHANTUS" and it took on responsibility for the national school computer network, and publishing school textbooks and electronic learning material.

== Organisation and structure ==
According to its institutional framework of operation, it is administered by a director and governed by a nine-member board of directors. At an operational level it functions according to the regulations governing the private sector.

To achieve its aims, RA-CTI develops partnerships with public and private sector institutions, with universities and research centres at both national and international levels and maintains close ties with the Greek academic community. Four Greek Universities are represented on its executive board.

The RA-CTI is also entitled to establish branches in Greece and abroad, to receive loans and to award postgraduate or post-doctoral grants.

== Role ==
The aim of the organisation is to participate in national and European research initiatives, to conduct in basic and applied research, to assimilate international scientific and technological know-how to the highest degree, the continuous scientific and research advancement of its personnel and to align the research it conducts with the specific technological needs of the country.

The objectives of RA-CTI according to its institutional framework are:

- To conduct basic and applied research in hardware and software technology, networks and the socio-economic, et al. impacts of the Information Society (InfoSoc).
- To design and develop products and services
- To support all forms of education and training with respect to Information and Communication Technologies and the InfoSoc.
- To develop technology and to transfer know-how
- To provide consulting, planning and administration services, particularly to the Ministry of Education and Religious Affairs and at a broader scale to the public sector, to natural and legal entities, as well as to social institutions in matters dealing with the migration of the country to the Information Society.
