= ETEM =

Greek aluminum company

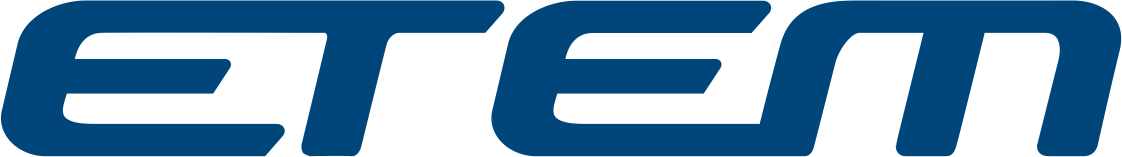
- Industry: Aluminium
- Founded: 1971
- Headquarters: Athens, Greece
- Area served: Worldwide
- Parent: Cosmos Aluminium S.A
- Website: http://www.etem.com/

ETEM (Commercial and Industrial Company of Light Metals) is a Greek aluminium extrusion and architectural systems design company headquartered in Athens. Since 2023, it has been part of the Cosmos Aluminium Group, following its merger through absorption.

== History ==
The company was founded in 1971 as the “Company of Light Metals.” It was the first Greek company to design and produce integrated aluminium architectural systems and was responsible for the first curtain wall on a high-rise building in Greece (Athens Tower, 1970s).

== Activity and Production ==
ETEM produces aluminum profiles for architectural and industrial applications. It operates a production unit — in Magoula, Attica — with a total capacity of over 15,000 tons per year, while it maintains significant commercial activity through subsidiaries in Bulgaria, Romania, Serbia and Ukraine.

== Merger with Cosmos Aluminium S.A ==
The strategic cooperation agreement with Cosmos Aluminium was signed in December 2022 and finalized in 2023.

The new corporate entity strengthened the position of both companies in the international aluminium market, combining expertise in extrusion and architectural system development.
