= Barbastathis =

Greek brand of frozen vegetables

Barba Stathis S.A. (Greek: Μπάρμπα Στάθης) is the name of a Greek brand of frozen vegetables, owned today by IDEAL Holdings S.A.

It was founded in 1969 in Thessaloniki by Giannis Michailidis from Drama.

In 1991 it entered the Athens Stock Exchange and in 1994 it was by bought by Delta dairy company (Daskalopoulos).

As of 2017 it is the leading brand of frozen vegetables, found mostly in Greek supermarkets. The company maintains a factory in the industrial area of Sindos, Thessaloniki.

== Sources ==
- Ελληνική Βιομηχανία
