= Prapopoulos Bros s.a. =

Prapopoulos Bros S.A. (Greek: Αφοί Πραπόπουλοι Α.Ε.) is a Greek company based in Patras. Founded in 1886 as a metalworking firm, it manufactured agricultural, spraying equipment and other metal goods for more than a century and is one of the 25 oldest surviving companies in Greece.

Since 2016 it has been engaged in property management, and the PRAPOPOULOS trademark is licensed to third parties.

== Foundation and early growth ==
The firm was founded in 1886 by the half-brothers Constantine and George Prapopoulos, natives of Zatouna in Arcadia, who had settled in Patras a few years back and taken over the management of a smithy at 58 Agiou Andreou Street. Its principal product was the crop sprayer, demand for which was driven by the spread of downy mildew in the vineyards of the region at a time when the port of Patras held a significant position in the currant export trade. The company also produced pins, nails, cutlery, aluminum utensils and portable gas cookers.

In 1893 the firm built a metalworking plant in central Patras, on a site occupying most of a city block. According to Nikolaos Sarafopoulos, its mechanical installation was comparable to European plants of the period. In 1898 the company was appointed a supplier to the royal court of King George 1st. It won a silver medal (Groupe VII, Classe 36) at the Exposition Universelle de Paris in 1900, and gold and silver awards at the first Chania Exhibition in Crete. During the 1910s and 1920s the plant had sufficient installed generating capacity to sell electricity to private premises and to the Electricity Company of Patras, before the construction of the Glafkos hydroelectric station.

The business was reconstituted as a société anonyme in 1929. In 1936 it received the Special Organiser's Prize at the 6th Thessaloniki International Fair commemorating 50 years of business

== Second World War ==
The factory was bombed by the Italian Air Force on 6 November 1940. It remained in operation, producing mess tins and canteens for the Greek army, until the arrival of German troops in Patras in spring 1941.

== Post-war period ==
The factory resumed operation after the war and renewed its product range. In 1977 it moved to new premises of 2,500 m² on the outskirts of Patras, near the river Glafkos. In 2006 it received the Special Organiser's Prize at the 21st Agrotica exhibition in Thessaloniki. Until 2016 the company produced sprayers, stainless steel containers for the storage of liquid foods, and wine-making equipment for the amateur winemaker.

From 2016 the company changed its scope of activity to property management and licensed the use of the PRAPOPOULOS trademark to third parties. Use of the trademark has continued in agricultural technology applications, including crop spraying and monitoring by unmanned aircraft.

The site of the original plant is now occupied by the Megaron Prapopoulou, a commercial building of 2,000 m².

== Ownership and management ==
All sons of the two founders were involved in the business. The children of Constantine Prapopoulos gradually withdrew, transferring their shares to Marios Prapopoulos. Management remained with the founders' descendants into the fourth generation.

Chairmen of the board:

1. Constantine P. Prapopoulos (1929–1932)
2. George P. Prapopoulos (1932–1958)
3. Marios G. Prapopoulos (1958–1970)
4. George M. Prapopoulos (1970–1999)
5. Marios G. Prapopoulos (1999-to date)

== Legacy ==
Metalwork produced by the factory, particularly from its early years, is held in museums and historic sites in Greece. A 19th-century pitcher bearing the factory's mark is displayed at the Museum of Greek Folk Art in Athens.
