= Eskimo (appliances) =

Greek brand of home appliances

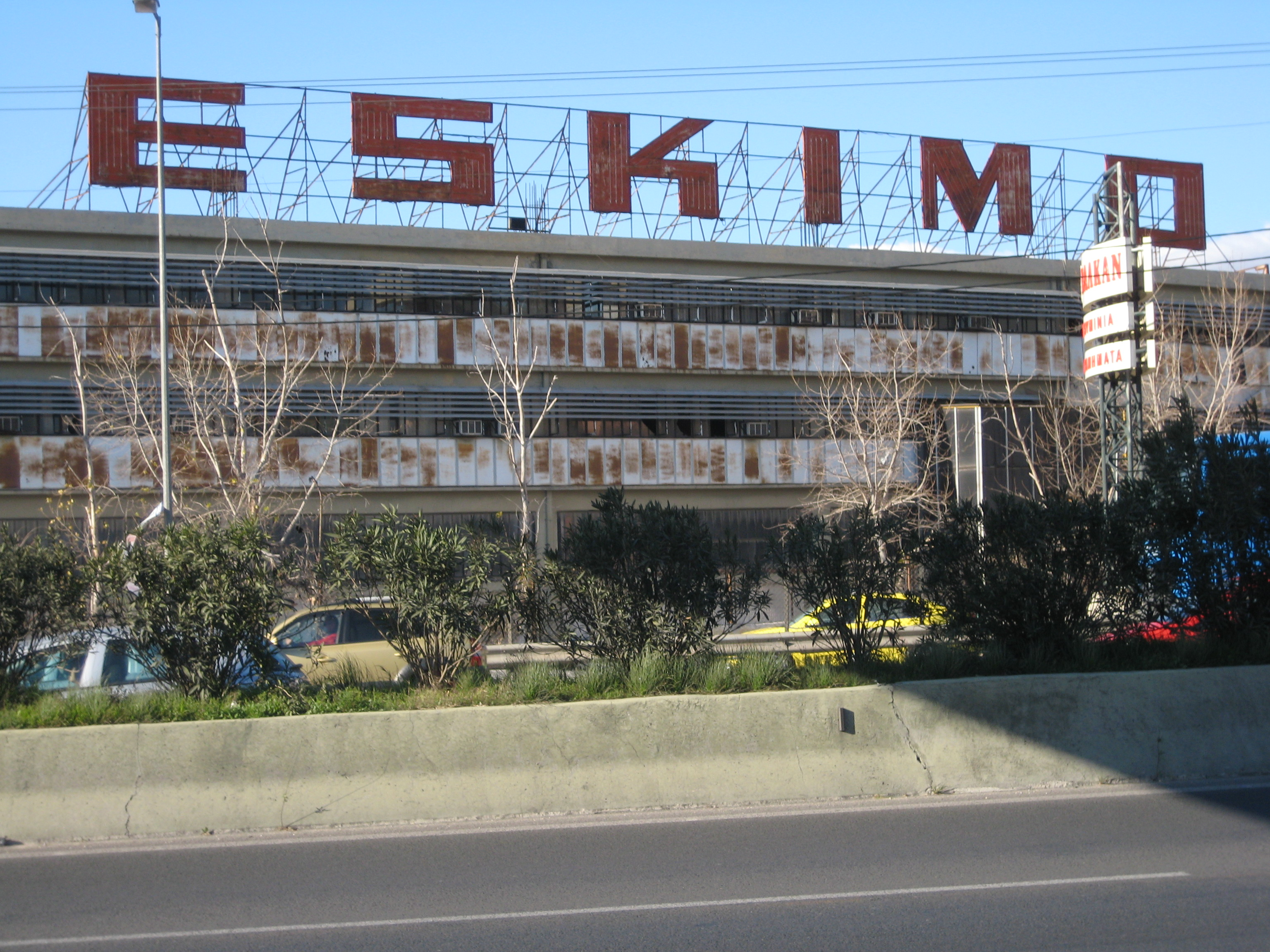
The former Eskimo factory in Athens, 2008

Eskimo is the brand name of home appliances (refrigerators, freezers, kitchen ovens, heaters, TV sets etc.) produced by Viometal Eskimo, a Greek company founded in 1958. The spectacular development of this company (by 1973 it employed over 1500 and held a 27% stake of the Greek home appliances market) was followed by a disastrous merger with Izola, a former competitor, in 1977. The new company (Elinda, for [H]ellenic Industry of Appliances) went bankrupt after a few years, while a branch of the former company survived, focusing on trading and TV assembly. In 2001 it merged with F.G. Europe, a Greek electric and electronic appliance trading company.
