= Pouliadis Associates Corporation =

Greek information technology company

- Native name: Πουλιάδης και Συνεργάτες
- Industry: Information technology
- Founder: Thanasis Pouliadis
- Headquarters: Greece
- Website: www.pouliadis.gr at the Wayback Machine (archived August 20, 2010)

Pouliadis Associates Corporation (Pouliadis kai Synergates AEBE, Πουλιάδης και Συνεργάτες ΑΕΒΕ) is an information technology company in Greece, once one of the largest in the country but now it faces serious financial turbulence. Its founder was Thanasis Pouliadis.

The company was once supporting the Greek language in Microsoft Windows 3.1 and 3.11, and was importing and selling products of IBM and other companies. Today it has some revenue from support contracts.

The company is a shareholder of a major IT company in Turkey, as well as another IT firm in Greece. Its main creditors are Alpha Bank, Cyprus Popular Bank, Eurobank EFG, and National Bank of Greece, and the company has now reached an agreement for a new 2 million euro loan from the banks to allow it to maintain its activities during its recent economic problems.
