= IMC Technologies =

Greek technology company

- Company type: Private
- Industry: Knowledge Management, Big Data Analytics
- Founded: 2004
- Founders: Panos Georgolios, Konstantinos Kafentzis, George Papavassiliou
- Headquarters: Chalandri, Athens, Greece
- Area served: Worldwide
- Products: knowledge acceletator, edialogos, appweevr for publishers
- Website: www.imc.com.gr

IMC Technologies is technology company headquartered in Athens, Greece. Founded in 2004, by Panos Georgolios, Konstantinos Kafentzis and George Papavassiliou, IMC Technologies provides knowledge management software. Its products include edialogos, knowledge accelerator and appweevr.

In 2008, IMC Technologies founder Panos Georgolios was awarded the Young Entrepreneur Award by the Athens Chamber of Commerce and Industry Company revenue at that time had increased more than 300% since its beginning.
