= Fage =

Dairy company founded in Greece

FAGE ΦΑΓΕ
- Type: Private
- Founded: 1926 (Athens, Greece)
- Headquarters: Strassen, Luxembourg
- Key people: Athanassios-Kyros Filippou (Chairman) Athanassios Filippou (Vice Chairman & CEO) Robert Shea (CFO)
- Products: Dairy (yogurt, Greek yogurt, cheese, ice cream)
- Revenue: $535.63 million (2021)
- Operating income: $44.46 million (2021)
- Net income: $15.80 million (2021)
- Total assets: $656.76 million (2021)
- Total equity: $284,774 million (2021)
- Owner: Filippou family
- Number of employees: 1,400
- Website: home.fage

Fage International S.A. (Greek: Φάγε [ˈfaʝe]) is an international dairy company founded in Athens, Greece, and as of 2012 headquartered in Strassen, Luxembourg. One of the major dairy brands in Greece, its products include milk, yogurt and ice cream. Its name is both the singular imperative verb meaning 'eat!' in Greek and the initials of Φιλίππου Αδελφοί Γαλακτοκομικές Επιχειρήσεις, Filíppou Adelfoí Galaktokomikés Epicheiríseis, 'Filippou Brothers Dairy Company'.

== History ==
=== Yogurt ===
In 1974 the current Fage factory was built. New varieties and flavors were introduced shortly after. In 1981, exports to the European market began. Total, the first commercial strained yogurt, was introduced, becoming a huge success.

=== Cheese ===
In 1991 Fage entered the cheese market, mostly manufacturing traditional Greek cheese. It produces, packs and supplies to consumers in Greece and abroad a variety of cheeses including its trademark Feta cheese. Today, Fage has a large range of cheeses including: Feta, Graviera, Trikalino, Trikalino Light, Gouda, Edam, Plagia, Regato, Sandwich Cheese, Junior portions, Junior slices, Junior Meridoules, and Flair.

=== Milk ===
In 1993 Fage entered the fresh milk market, introducing FAGE Fresh Milk all over Greece. In this same year, the company built new factories exclusively for fresh pasteurized milk, a new line of pasteurization, homogenization, new machinery, and packaging.

Additionally, after a significant investment in research and machinery, Fage presented a new innovative product to the Greek market, High Pasteurized Milk, which created a new category of milk.

Today, Fage offers a wide range of milk including its most popular Farma Milk.

=== Subsequent operations ===
In June 1999, the dioxin problems that plagued several milk exporters from Belgium started a public scare that resulted in the disposal of all dioxin-affected milk. Several months later by the Fall, Fage's dairy products became free of dioxins and the company began to use milk exported from decontaminated countries.

In the late-1990s Fage began marketing its products and began selling in Belgium, France, Germany, Italy, the Netherlands, and the United Kingdom. From 2001 the company entered the United States where it has located its headquarters in Johnstown, NY. The yogurt was later featured in Saveur magazine.

In October 2012, the company announced that it would be moving its world headquarters out of Greece to Luxembourg. Reasons for the move include more favorable tax conditions, better access to bank funding, and a reduced exposure to the Greek financial crisis.

== Advertising ==
The Fage logo with Greek lettering

In 2007, Fage put a billboard along the route of the Macy's Thanksgiving Day Parade. The billboard looked as if a Tweety balloon had become stuck in the yogurt. In 2011, Fage began airing "its first television advertisements in North America," featuring voiceover work by actor Willem Dafoe.

== See also ==
- List of companies in Greece
