= Peiraiki Microbrewery =

Microbrewery in Greece

Peiraiki Microbrewery EPE
- Location: Drapetsona, Greece

Active beers
Name	Type
Pils
Pale Ale

Peiraiki Microbrewery (Greek: Πειραϊκή Μικροζυθοποιία) is a microbrewery situated in Drapetsona, Piraeus regional unit, Greece.

The company produces two types of beer using traditional organic methods and according to the German Reinheitsgebot method of 1516. The result is either a Peiraiki Pils or Peiraiki Pale Ale (both 5% ABV).

The beer is bottled in 330ml, 500ml and 1l bottles.

Peiraiki products are certified as organic by the Organisation for the Control and Certification of Biological Products or DIO (Greek: Οργανισμός Ελέγχου και Πιστοποίησης Βιολογικών Προϊόντων - ΔΗΩ).
