= Minos Wines =

Greek wine producer

Minos Wines is a Greek wine producer from Crete. The company was founded in 1932, and is privately owned by the Miliarakis family. It was one of the major producers of Cretan wine until 1990, after which its market share declined due to financial problems and personal disputes. As of 2005, the company produced 400,000 liters annually. Over 70% of its production is sold domestically, much of it in a traditional style in the low-priced market, though it produces a few higher-end wines in a more modern style, with production of a few thousand bottles per year each.
