= Aeolian Investment Fund S.A. =

Aeolian Investment Fund S.A. is a Greek company which is listed on the Athens Stock Exchange (Athex: AIOLC) and invests in other Greek companies.

The company was founded in 1992, has been listed on the Athens Stock Exchange since 1993 and is based in Athens, Greece.
