= Profile Systems and Software =

Greek information technology company

Profile Systems and Software S.A.
- Type: Public
- Traded as: Athex: PROF
- Industry: Financial software
- Founded: Athens, Greece (1990)
- Founder: Babis P. Stasinopoulos
- Headquarters: 199, Syngrou Ave., Nea Smyrni, Athens, Greece
- Number of locations: 12 (Miami, Singapore, Oslo, Stockholm, Leicester, Thessaloniki and Patras)
- Area served: Worldwide
- Key people: Babis P. Stasinopoulos; Evangelos I. Angelides; Spyros A. Barbatos; Aris S. Iliopoulos
- Products: ProfileOne; AI.Adaptive; Axia Suite; Axia UK; Finuevo Suite; Finuevo Core; Finuevo Digital; RiskAvert; Registar; Centevo Suite; Algosystems Cyber
- Services: Software development; Software integration
- Revenue: €47.5 million (2025)
- Operating income: ▲€8.2 million (2025)
- Net income: ▲€6.43 million (2025)
- Total assets: ▲€88 million (2025)
- Total equity: ▲€40.2 million (2025)
- Number of employees: 400+
- Website: www.profilesw.com

Profile Systems and Software S.A. (frequently referred to as Profile Software) is an international information technology software provider for banking wealth, treasury, risk and digital banking services with AI- related functionality and ability to evolve its product capabilities. The company also targets public sector projects that focus on advanced technology and Gen-AI projects. The company develops cloud-enabled and software-as-a-service (SaaS) platforms, and provides implementation and consulting services. It operates 12 centers and has a presence in 50 countries.

== History ==
The company was founded in 1990 by Babis P. Stasinopoulos. Being an investor at Athens Exchange in the late 1980s, Stasinopoulos felt the need of software applications for automating workflow and helping with the investment decisions. Therefore, his idea was to fill this market niche.

For the first four years, his company operated as a private enterprise. In 1995 it was converted into a public limited company (societe anonyme) with an initial capital of 70 Δρ. million. In 1999 its share capital was increased to 1.2 Δρ. billion, while its turnover reached 1.8 Δρ. billion. In the decade that followed, Profile Software was already the leading financial software company and one of the 10 largest IT companies in Greece. Its number of employees exceeded 150.

In August 2003, the company was publicly listed on the Athens Exchange. In the following year it completed mergers through acquisition with BeCom and Analysis, as well as acquired a 70% stake in Globalsoft.

In 2007, the company began incorporating development of two large software products: the Financial Management System (FMS) and Universal Ticketing Solution (UTS).

By 2010, Profile had contracted such companies and organizations as National Bank of Greece, EFG Eurobank, ING, ABN AMRO, and public sector institutions.

Profile Systems and Software opened four new offices in major financial centers: Geneva, London, Dubai, and Singapore. It also expanded its promotional and marketing activities through a network of partners in Europe, the Middle East, and Asia.

In 2013, the company introduced the P2P Lending Software implemented in UK-based crowdfunding firms.

In 2014, the company launched Axia Suite, an investment management platform developed as the successor to its IMSplus system. Axia includes cloud-native architecture designed for custodians, wealth managers, and fund managers.

In 2017, Profile Software acquired 100% of the international Treasury specialised provider Login SA based in Paris, France.

In 2020, Profile Software established Profile Technologies in Thessaloniki, Greece, to serve as a regional software development hub.

In 2021, the company acquired a 100% stake in Euronext Centevo, a Nordic-based provider of asset and fund management software technology.

In 2024, Profile launched AI.Adaptive, a large language model (LLM)-agnostic platform designed to integrate artificial intelligence capabilities with existing financial infrastructure.

In 2025, Profile acquired Algosystems, a Greek-based technology company providing specialised solutions, automation and cybersecurity services to enterprise and mid-market clients. Algosystems brings MSSP, cybersecurity and cloud services to Profile’s ecosystem.

In 2026, Profile acquired the UK-based financial technology company Contemi Solutions (UK) Ltd, a provider of cloud-based wealth and investment management software. Following the acquisition, the entity was rebranded as Profile Solutions (UK) Ltd, with its features integrated into the Axia Suite platform.

In 2026, the company introduced ProfileOne, a Governed AI orchestration platform designed for financial institutions to centralize core banking, wealth management, and customer relationship management (CRM) workflows into a unified data environment.

The company was included in industry reports published by Gartner (Retail Banking Magic Quadrant Europe) and Forrester (Wealth Management providers Europe. In the IBS Intelligence Sales League Table, the company was listed in the Leadership Club and ranked second in the Investment & Fund Management, Islamic (Wholesale Banking), and Treasury & Capital Markets categories. In the Chartis FinTech Quadrant report, its wealth portfolio suite was identified as a category leader for Advisor Desktop technology.
