= CE.RE.TE.TH =

Greek nonprofit entity

Coordinates: 39.3711°N 22.8743°E

Center for Research and Technology Thessaly
- Native name: Κέντρο Έρευνας Τεχνολογίας και Ανάπτυξης Θεσσαλίας
- Type: Non-profit research entity
- Founded: January 2006
- Headquarters: Volos, Thessaly, Greece
- Parent: General Secretariat for Research and Technology (GSRT)
- Website: www.cereteth.gr

The Center for Research and Technology Thessaly, or CE.RE.TE.TH (Greek: Κ.Ε.Τ.Ε.Α.Θ), is a legal, nonprofit entity organized under the auspices of the General Secretariat for Research and Technology (GSRT), of the Greek Ministry of Development. CE.RE.TE.TH was established in January 2006. The center's main mission is to conduct basic, applied, and technological research that leads to new products and services with industrial, economic and social impact and supports the R&D needs of local, national, and European industrial and government institutions. CE.RE.TE.TH organization includes four institutes located in the capital cities of the four prefectures of Thessaly region and the central administration located in the city of Volos.

== Central Administration ==
The Central Administration is located in the city of Volos and it is responsible for the administrative operation of the center and the four Institutes. Volos was chosen as the total majority of industry and enterprises are located there.

== Mechatronics Institute (IMTRONICS) ==
The Mechatronics Institute (IMTRONICS) is responsible for the promotion of research and services for innovative applications in areas of Micromechanics, Materials, Nanomaterials, Nanostructures, Information and Telematic Systems, Robotics and control Systems, Embedded Systems and Sensors and Biomechatronics. The institute is located at CE.RE.TE.TH's headquarters in Volos.

== Institute of Technology and Management of Agricultural Ecosystems (ITEMA) ==
The Institute of Technology and Management of Agricultural Ecosystems (ITEMA) is responsible, for the promotion of research and services in the areas of sustainable agricultural production, rural environment and timber technology. It has two departments located in Volos and Karditsa. The Volos department of (ITEMA) addresses research issues related to integrated and organic production of agricultural products, water and land resources, information and computer technologies in agriculture, agricultural constructions and buildings (greenhouses, livestock buildings), safety management and certification, biomass and biofuel production and food health. The Karditsa department of ITEMA studies animal husbandry.

== Institute of Human Performance & Rehabilitation (PerfoTech) ==
The Institute of Human Performance & Rehabilitation (PerfoTech), is responsible for the advancement of research and technologies in areas of human movement biology, aiming at increases in bodily performance potentials and improvements in the quality of life.
