= Pyramis =

Pyramis Group
- Type: Public (S.A.)
- Industry: Kitchen Fixtures; Kitchen Appliances
- Founded: 1960
- Founder: Alexandros Bakatselos
- Headquarters: Thessaloniki, Greece
- Key people: Nikolaos Bakatselos (President & CEO)
- Products: Stainless Steel Sinks; Composite Sinks; Faucets; Kitchen Appliances
- Revenue: ▲€65.035 million (2016)
- Operating income: ▲€13.811 million (2016)
- Net income: ▲€229.551 thousand (2016)
- Total assets: ▲€66.085 million (2016)
- Total equity: ▲€50.863 million (2016)
- Number of employees: 420 (2016)
- Subsidiaries: Pyramis Polska; Pyramis Deutschland; Pyramis Romania; Pyramis UK; Pyramis Italia; Pyramis Bulgaria; Pyramis Russia; Pyramis UAE; Pyramis Marketing India
- Website: pyramisgroup.com

Pyramis Group /ˈpɪrɑːmɪs/ is a Greek multinational kitchen products corporation, headquartered in Thessaloniki, Greece.

== History ==
=== The Decade of Establishment: 1960–1968 ===
In 1960, Alexandros Bakatselos, Chairman of Pyramis, opened a small workshop specialising in metal-framed furniture. By the end of the decade, in 1968, he founded Pyramis A.E. and started to manufacture stainless steel sinks for the domestic market.

=== The Decade of Property Growth: 1969–1978 ===
The company moved to its current 286,000m² location, just outside Thessaloniki; Greece's’ second city. In 1972, a further production unit was added to develop stainless steel cookware.

=== The Decade of Exports Orientation: 1979–1988 ===
By now, Pyramis was already the market leader of stainless steel cookware and sinks in Greece. A strategic decision was made to export goods to the international marketplace, focusing on Europe in the main, and this derived immediate success with exponential growth.

=== The Decade of International Sales Growth: 1989–1998 ===
By the 4th decade of the business, sales for Pyramis products had doubled because of the International export market. In order to facilitate the increased demand, the company installed a new production line for monoblock sinks.

=== The Decade of Accomplishments: 1999–2008 ===
The 5th decade has encompassed the decade of accomplishments. During this period the company began building the Pyramis brand as opposed to offering own label products and has since concentrated its market in the premium goods sector. From the 1999 establishment of its first subsidiary in Poland, today 70% of the company’s annual turnover is achieved from exports. Pyramis now has an efficient export sales network in more than 50 countries worldwide, and eight commercial subsidiaries in Europe and the Middle East.

=== Acquisition of parts of PITSOS assets ===
Pyramis started production of electric appliances in a new factory near Athens, in December 2022, after acquiring parts of the infrastructure, as well as technology (and through hiring of former personnel) of the historic Pitsos appliances manufacturer, following the latter's shutdown of Greek production in 2021.

== Corporate structure ==
Pyramis Group has its headquarters in Liti (in Thessaloniki, Greece). The Department of Sales in Greece is incorporated in the mother company, Pyramis Metallourgia A.E. Sales to other countries are either through subsidiary companies to those (or neighbouring countries), or directly from the mother company to importers/distributors/wholesalers/kitchen-manufactures in those countries.

== Products ==
Kitchen

- Stainless steel sinks
- Composite sinks
- Minikitchens and Pantries
- Faucets
- Cookerhoods
- Hobs (electric, vitro-ceramic, gas)
- Fridges
- Ovens
- Microwave ovens
- Dish-washers

Bathroom

- Bathtubs
- Faucets
- Hydro-massage systems

== Corporate affairs ==
=== Historical logos ===
This logo was registered in 1989 and represented the corporate identity of Pyramis for 14 years. During this time Pyramis invested heavily, modernized its equipment and started building systematically its international network.

The logo used today became official in March 2002, and Pyramis turned into a more marketing oriented direction, building its brand name, upgrading its offering, and investing in research and development.

=== Corporate culture ===
The official business language of Pyramis is English.
