= Sergal (dairy) =

Dairy products company

Sergal (Greek: Σερραϊκή Βιομηχανία Γάλακτος), Serres Milk Industry, is the name of a Greek dairy products company based in Serres, Macedonia, Greece.

It was founded in 1964 by Agrotiki Bank and was sold to private sector in 1995.
