= Lavipharm =

Greek pharmaceutical company

Lavipharm S.A.
- Company type: S.A.
- Traded as: ATHEX was Lavi
- Founded: 1911
- Headquarters: Athens, Greece
- Key people: Telemaque Lavidas (CEO)
- Products: pharmaceutical, cosmetic, veterinary & Consumer health products
- Revenue: €61,001,000 (2024)
- Net income: €25,080,000 (2024)

Lavipharm S.A. is the largest integrated Greek pharmaceutical company that develops, manufactures, markets and distributes pharmaceutical, cosmetic, veterinary and consumer health products in Greece and internationally (France, Cyprus and the United States). It was founded in 1911, by the Lavidas’ family, and listed on the Athens Stock Exchange in 1995.
