= Terkenlis =

Greek chain of patisserie shops

- Industry: Confectionery
- Founded: 1948
- Headquarters: Thessaloniki, Greece
- Website: Terkenlis

Terkenlis (Greek: Τερκενλής) is a chain of patisserie shops in Thessaloniki, Macedonia, northern Greece, and fifteen outlets in the vicinity, and in Athens. Other services to the public include catering.

== History ==
Terkenlis was founded by Stavros Terkenlis in 1948 in Thessaloniki, northern Greece. The company has remained family-run; its owner and managing director is Pavlos Terkenlis.

The oldest of the shops is in central Thessaloniki, in the main square on the corner of Tsimiski Street and Aristotelous Square. Terkenlis has since opened its first Australian store in the small Hellenic shopping village of Earlwood in Sydney.

== Products ==
There is a wide range of products available at the stores; many are made according to traditional Greek recipes, such as baklava and kadaif. It also sells chocolate-covered tsoureki.
