= Tsantali =

Tsantali was a Greek wine and liquor producer. The company was founded in East Thrace (now part of Turkey), and originally produced ouzo and tsipouro. After its move westward to Macedonia, it increasingly focused on wine production, which by 2005 accounted for approximately four-fifths of its production volume and just under half its revenue, making it one of the two major wine companies of Macedonia (along with Boutari). As of 2005, it owned 260 hectares of vineyards and had another 1,250 ha under contract, and produced 16–20 million liters of wine per year. Of its exports, approximately 65% go to Germany. The company had a particular reputation for reviving wine styles with historical associations, of which the Rapsani and Agion Oros lines have been its most successful.
