= Kyknos S.A. =

Greek food company

KYKNOS
- Type: private
- Founded: 1915
- Headquarters: Nafplion, Greece
- Products: tomatoes
- Revenue: 20,715 million € (2014)
- Net income: 0,824 million € (2014)
- Number of employees: 70
- Website: kyknoscanning.com

KYKNOS S.A. (Greek: Κύκνος meaning swan) is the oldest Greek canning company, founded in 1915 in Nafplion.

It manufactures tomato paste, purée, ketchup and tomato sauces. It is one of the major tomato paste brands in the country and a supplier of tomato paste for many brands throughout the world.

In 2002 the company’s production and distribution centers were relocated to the village of Savalia, Elis.

== History ==
The company was founded by Michail Manoussakis while he was still physics teacher at the Piraeus High School. Michail and his brother Kostis Manoussakis manufactured the first 1000 cans of whole peeled tomatoes on the Kostis Farm in Asini, which is in the Argolis district of the Peloponnese.

== Logo ==
Its logo includes a swan over the sea. Its colour is red.

== See also ==
- List of companies in Greece
