= Pitsos =

Company

PITSOS S.A
- Type: Subsidiary
- Industry: Manufacturing
- Founded: 1865
- Founder: Pitsos family
- Defunct: Greek production ended in 2021, trading activity continues
- Headquarters: Kifissia, Athens, Greece
- Area served: Greece, Europe, Middle East
- Products: White goods
- Revenue: ▲€408.47 million (2014)
- Net income: ▲€32.95 million (2014)
- Number of employees: 1,400 (2014)
- Parent: BSH Hausgeräte
- Website: Official website

1968 Pitsos 50 cc 3-wheel truck

Pitsos A.E. (Πίτσος) was founded in Athens in 1865 and began as a company manufacturing small household appliances and oil heaters. In 1959 it began production of fridges in a new factory; it soon invested heavily on the development and production of a wide range of modern home appliances, including TV sets. Other metal structures, including 3-wheel pickup trucks were also produced. In 1976 it was bought by Bosch-Siemens Hausgeräte GmbH. In 1996 was rebranded to "BSH A.B.E. Ikiakon Syskeyon". Gaggenau and Neff joined the group in 1998 and 2002 respectively. The company was rebranded to "BSH Home Appliances" ("BSH Ikiakes Syskeves A.B.E"). It then boasted a leading position in the Greek household appliances market with a market share of approximately 40%. Its revenue reached €308 Million in 2005. Approximately one third of the total revenue came from exports mainly to Europe and the Middle East.

Production facilities were located in Rentis, near Piraeus, and the company employed 1200 personnel in 2007. By that time it remained the leading white goods manufacturer (such as refrigerators, fridges and ovens and, decreasingly, washing systems) in Greece producing 400,000 units per year, 30% of which for export. The company manufactured products that incorporated substantial innovations such as the "No Frost" and "Super Frost" technologies on refrigeration systems and "pyrolysis" system on cooking systems.

In 2020 the company announced the shutdown of its factory in Greece and its relocation in Turkey. The factory was permanently closed on March 31, 2021, and the company only retains trading activity, however, the Pitsos brand name is still used, on products manufactured outside Greece.

Parts of Pitsos infrastructure, as well as technology and former personnel, were transferred to Pyramis, a Greek appliances company, which started production of electric appliances in a new factory in December 2022.
