= Atcom =

Greek software company

ATCOM S.A.
- Type: Private Company
- Industry: Software & Programming, content management, Digital Transformation, Consulting, Cloud Infrastructure
- Founded: 2000
- Headquarters: Athens, Greece
- Area served: Europe
- Key people: Konstantinos Theotokas, Founder & CEO; Constantine Kamaras, Vice-President of the BoD; Vasilis Ntanas, Chief Financial Officer; Kyriakos Komvoteas, COO; Nikos Liokalos, Chief Technology Officer, Jason Kataropoulos, Chief Commercial Officer
- Products: Netvolution, Tapvolution, Cookiemon
- Number of employees: 140
- Website: https://www.atcom.gr/

ATCOM is a digital business agency based in Greece. The primary products of ATCOM are Netvolution, a web content management system and Tapvolution, a mobile content management system, both of which use the .Net Framework. ATCOM has its headquarters in Athens.

== Capabilities ==
- Commerce
- Technology
- Business Transformation
- Usability & UX
- Visual Design
- Mobile
- Experiential/IoT
- Performance Marketing
- Enterprise Architecture
- Cloud Infrastructure

== Education ==
Netvolution, ATCOM's content management system is being taught as a module at the Department of Informatics, of the University of Piraeus.

== History ==
- ATCOM becomes a Société Anonyme and a member of the Dionic Group of companies, listed in the Athens Stock Exchange, 2000.
- The first version of Netvolution is introduced, 2003. The second version follows on 2006
- ATCOM proceeded on the acquisition of Mindworks. Mindworks is a Digital Marketing Agency. The third version of Netvolution is introduced and ATCOM becomes a Gold Certified Partner of Microsoft.
- ATCOM acquired the Linkwise network. Linkwise is a Greek performance marketing and affiliate network, 2010
- ATCOM launch the first version of their mobile content management system, Tapvolution, 2010
- ATCOM wins the Business IT Award, for the specialization in Content Management Systems, 2012
- ATCOM wins two e-volution Awards, for best Ecommerce and M-Commerce platforms, 2012
- UXlab is introduced as a new business unit of ATCOM, focusing on Usabitily and User Experience services, 2012
- For the second time in a row, ATCOM wins a Business IT Award for the specialization in Content Management Systems, 2013
- ATCOM is named 2015 Microsoft Country Partner of the Year (Greece) at the Microsoft Partner Awards
- ATCOM is named 2017 Microsoft Country Partner of the Year (Greece) at the Microsoft Partner Awards
- ATCOM acquires new Business Unit in partnership with Akamai, as an official Partner Reseller
- ATCOM is named e-Commerce agency of the Year, at the e-volution awards 2019
- ATCOM is named e-Commerce agency of the Year, at the e-volution awards 2020, for the second consecutive year

== See also ==
- Content Management System
- List of content management systems
