= Izola (appliances) =

A 1952 advertisement for an Izola refrigerator. "Civilization at home" was then the company motto!

Izola was one of the most historic brand names in Greek industrial history. The company was founded in 1930 as a manufacturer of metal products (mostly metal tubing) and in 1934 was taken over by Panagiotis Drakos who since 1906 owned a company involved in hydraulic equipment trading. Panagiotis and his son Georgios are connected with the spectacular rise of this company that became a dominant manufacturer of home appliances in Greece after World War II.

Izola produced equipment for the Greek military during preparations after the outbreak of World War II, while during the Axis occupation its facilities were used by the occupying powers for vehicle repair and maintenance. It recovered soon after the war and in 1951 it introduced its first electric home appliances. Soon an extended range of products was introduced (kitchen ovens, refrigerators, freezers, heaters, TV sets etc.) and the company became a legendary success story in Greek industrial history. These were the times of the Greek economic miracle and industries like Izola benefited greatly from improving living standards. Izola was a classic case of a brand name associated in people's minds with progress, modernity and a more comfortable life. Its demise, however, is equally spectacular and is in a way representative of the sad evolutions in Greek industry in general, after 1980. The beginning of the end came with the disastrous merger with Eskimo, a former competitor, in 1977, after the company had already started facing some economic problems. The new company (Elinda, for [H]ellenic Industry of Appliances) was a financial ruin only a few years later, and in 1991 it effectively went out of business altogether. Today, a huge, idle and run-down factory near Thiva bears testimony to the downfall of one of Greece's most beloved and (once) successful brand names.

== References/External links ==
- A Greek fairy tale without a happy end, article in Imerisia newspaper (in Greek)
- Home Appliances Assembly Line & Conveyor Manufacturer
- L.S. Skartsis, "Greek Vehicle & Machine Manufacturers 1800 to present: A Pictorial History", Marathon (2012) ISBN 978-960-93-4452-4 (eBook)
