= List of companies listed on the Athens Stock Exchange =

This is a list of companies ever listed on the Athens Stock Exchange, since its foundation date back in 1876.

== Airlines ==
Company	Symbol	Trading Status	ISIN
Aegean Airlines S.A.	AEGN	since 2007	GRS495003006

== Banks ==
Company	Symbol	Trading Status	ISIN
Alpha Services and Holdings S.A	ALPHA	since 1925	GRS015003007
Attica Bank	TATT	since 1964	GRS001003029
Bank of Cyprus	BOCHGR	since 2024	IE00BD5B1Y92
Bank of Greece	TELL	since 1930	GRS004013009
Eurobank Ergasias Services and Holdings S.A	EUROB	since 1926	GRS323003012
National Bank of Greece	ETE	since 1905	GRS003003035
Optima bank	OPTIMA	since 2023	GRS533003000
Piraeus Bank S.A	TPEIR	since 1918	GRS831003009

== Casinos & Gambling ==
Company	Symbol	Trading Status	ISIN
OPAP S.A.	OPAP	since 2001	GRS419003009
Intralot S.A.	INLOT	since 1991	GRS343313003

== Chemicals ==
Company	Symbol	Trading Status	ISIN

== Commercial Vehicles & Parts ==
Company	Symbol	Trading Status	ISIN
AutoHellas S.A.	OTOEL	since 1999	GRS337003008
Petros Petropoulos S.A.	PETRO	since 1999	GRS345503007
Sfakianakis S.A.	SFAG	deleted 2019	

== Construction ==
Company	Symbol	Trading Status	ISIN
AEGEK S.A.	AEGEK	under suspension	GRS182003004
AVAX.S.A.	AVAX	since 1994	GRS213213002
BIOTER S.A.	Biot	since 1975	GRS135003002
Domiki Kritis S.A.	DOMIK	since 2000	GRS364253005
EKTER S.A.	Ekter	since 1994	GRS222213001
Ellaktor S.A.	Ellaktor	since 1994	GRS191213008
Intrakat S.A.	INKAT	since 2001	GRS432003028
Proodeftiki Technical Company S.A.	PRD	since 1993	GRS184003002

== Electricity ==
Company	Symbol	Trading Status	ISIN
ADMIE S.A.	ADMIE	since 2017	GRS518003009
Public Power Corporation S.A.	PPC	since 2001	GRS434003000

== Energy ==
Company	Symbol	Trading Status	ISIN
Terna Energy S.A.	TENERGY	since 2007	GRS496003005

== Food & Beverages ==
Company	Symbol
Coca-Cola HBC AG	ΕΕΕ

== Gaming and lodging ==
Company	Symbol
Astir Palace	ΑΣΤΗΡ
GEKE	ΠΡΕΖΤ
Lampsa	ΛΑΜΨΑ

== General Mining ==
Company	Symbol	Trading Status	ISIN
Iktinos Hellas S.A.	IKTIN	since 2000	GRS372003004
Mermeren Kombinat A.D. Prilep	MERCO	since 2004	GRK014011008

== Healthcare ==
Company	Symbol	Trading Status	ISIN
Athens Medical C.S.A.	IATR	since 1991	GRS147233001
IASO S.A.	IASO	since 2000	GRS379233000
Lavipharm S.A.	LAVI	since 1995	GRS246073001
Medicon Hellas S.A.	MEDIC	since 2001	GRS424003002
Vidavo S.A.	VIDAVO	since 2010	GRS511003006

== Holding companies ==
Company	Symbol
Albio Holdings	ΑΛΜΠ
Alfa-Alfa Holdings	
Attica Holdings	ΑΤΤΙΚΑ
AXON Holidings	ΑΧΟΝ
Lamda Development	ΛΑΜΔΑ
Marfin Investment Group	ΜΙΓ
Mytilinaios Holdings	ΜΥΤΙΛ
Sciens International Investments and Holdings	
Viohalco	ΒΙΟ
Delta Holdings	
Intracom Holdings	INTRK
Technical Olympic	ΟΛΥΜΠ
Fourlis Holdings	ΦΡΛΚ
Hadjioannou Holdings	ΧΑΤΖΚ
Mevako	ΜΕΒΑ
Venmann
GEK Terna	ΓΕΚ
Cenergy Holdings	CENER

== Insurance ==
Company	Symbol
Aspis Pronoia	ΑΣΑΣΚ
Europaiki Pisti	EYΠΙΚ
Phoenix Metrolife	

== Leasing ==
Leasing
Company	Symbol
Piraeus Leasing	

== Media & Entertainment ==
Company	Symbol	Trading Status	ISIN
Attica Publications S.A.	ATEK	since 1999	GRS340263003
AVE S.A.	AVE	since 2005	GRS489003004
Livanis S.A.	LIVAN	since 2002	GRS446003014

== Oil & Gas ==
Company	Symbol	Trading Status	ISIN
Elinoil Hellenic Petroleum Company S.A.	ELIN	since 2004	GRS477003008
Hellenic Petroleum S.A.	ELPE	since 1998	GRS298343005
Motor Oil Hellas Corinth Refineries S.A.	MOH	since 2001	GRS426003000
Revoil S.A.	REVOIL	since 2004	GRS473003002

== Personal and household goods ==
Durable household goods
Company	Symbol
Fourlis	
FG Europe	
Zamba	
Benrubi	
Sanyo Hellas	
Sarantis	ΣΑΡ
Vell Group	
Yalco Konstantinou	
Loulis	
Kri-Kri	

Furnishings
Company	Symbol
Dromeas	
SATO
Biokarpet	

Clothing and accessories
Company	Symbol	
Alsinco		
DUR		
Elmec Sport		
ETMA		
Elfico		
ELFE		
ELVE SA	ΕΛΒΕ	
Epilektos		
Fashion Box		
Fieratex		
Fintexport		
Folli Follie		under suspicion
Hadjioannou		
Hellenic Fabrics		
Lanakam		
Maxim Pertsinidis		
Mouzakis		
Minerva		
Nafpaktos Textile		
Texapret		
Eriourgia 3A		
United Textiles		
Varvaressos		

Toys
Company	Symbol
Centric Multimedia	ΣΕΝΤΡ

== Passenger shipping ==
Company	Symbol
ANEK Lines	
Blue Star Group	
Minoan Lines	
Nautiliaki Etaireia Lesvou	

== Plastics Industry ==
Company	Symbol
Crete Plastics	ΠΛΑΚΡ
Daios Plastics	ΔΑΙΟΣ
Elton	ΕΛΤΟΝ
Eurodrip	ΕΔΡΙΠ
Spirou	ΣΠΥΡ
Thrace Plastics	ΠΛΑΘ

== Retail trade ==
Company	Symbol
Jumbo S.A.	Mpela
Microland	
Moda Bagno	
Alfa-Beta Vassilopoulos	
Vardas	
Eikona Hxos	
Phillipos Nakas	
AS Toys Company	
Microland Computers	
Hellenic Duty Free Shops	
Motodynamiki	
Vivere Entertainment	
My Market	
Sklavenitis Hyper Market	

== Telecommunications ==
Company	Symbol
OTE	

== Technology ==
Company	Symbol
Plaisio Computers	
Vodafone Greece	
MLS (Making Life Simple) S.A.	
Quest Holdings	
Space Hellas	
Profile Tzirakian	
Altes Holdings	
Byte Computer	
Ideal Group	
ILYDA	
PC Systems	
Pagalidis Bros	

== Tobacco ==
Company	Symbol	Trading Status	ISIN
Karelia Tobacco Company INC. S.A.	KARE	since 1976	GRS120003009

== Water ==
Company	Symbol	Trading Status	ISIN
Athens Water Supply & Sewage Co	EYDAP	since 2000	GRS359353000
Thessaloniki Water & Sewage Company S.A.	EYAPS	since 2001	GRS428003008
