= FTSE/Athex Large Cap =

Greek stock market index

FTSE
- Foundation: 23 September 1997
- Exchanges: Athens Stock Exchange
- Trading symbol: FTSE (Athens Exchange); FTS:ATH (Financial Times); FTSE.AT (Yahoo! Finance)
- Constituents: 25
- Type: Large cap
- Website: helex.gr
- ISIN: GRI99201A006
- Bloomberg: FTASE

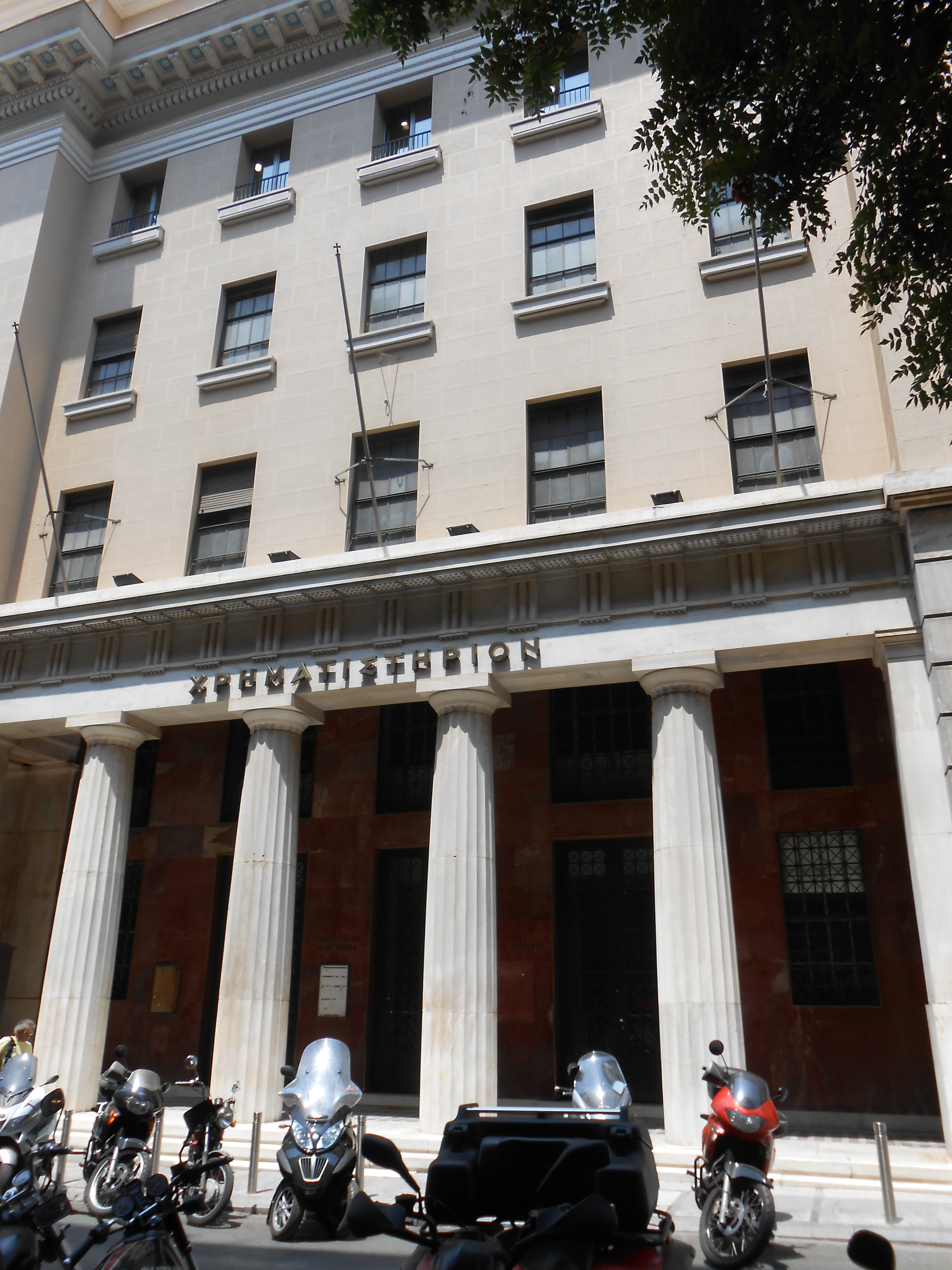
Old Athens Stock Exchange Sofokleous

The FTSE/Athex Large Cap is the stock index of the twenty-five largest companies on the Athens Stock Exchange.

As of 26 May 2018 the stocks comprising this index are: Viohalco, Coca-Cola HBC AG, EYDAP, Terna Energy, Lamda Development S.A., Hellenic Petroleum, Gr. Sarantis S.A, GEK Terna, Titan Cement, ADMIE Public Power Corporation, Mytilineos Holdings, OTE, OPAP, Motor Oil Hellas, Jumbo S.A., Piraeus Port Authority (OLP), Eurobank Ergasias, Alpha Bank, National Bank of Greece, Piraeus Bank, Folli Follie, Hellenic Exchanges Group, Grivalia Properties R.E.I.C., Aegean Airlines.

Former members in recent history include Ellaktor, Metka (Metal Constructions of Greece S.A.), Attica Bank, Fourlis S.A., ATEbank, Bank of Cyprus, Cosmote, Corinth Pipeworks, Emporiki Bank, EYDAP, Frigoglass, Intralot, Marfin Investment Group, Marfin Popular Bank/Cyprus Popular Bank, Greek Postal Savings Bank/TT Hellenic Postbank etc.

== History ==
The index was launched on 23 September 1997 (29 years ago); it was created by FTSE International Ltd. Until December 3, 2012 this index consisted of 20 companies and it was called FTSE/Athex 20. From 3 December 2012 to 19 June 2017 it consisted of 25 stocks. From 19 June 2017 to 18 December 2018 it consisted of 26 members. Since 18 December 2018, it consists once again of 25 members.

== Overview ==
As of December 2023:

Company	Traded as	Market Sector
Aegean Airlines	Athex: AEGN	Airlines
Alpha Bank	Athex: ALPHA	Banks
Jumbo	Athex: BELA	Toys
Cenergy Holdings	Athex: CENER	Industrial Goods & Services
Coca-Cola HBC AG	Athex: EEE	Soft Drinks
Ellaktor	Athex: ELLAKTOR	Construction & Materials
ElvalHalcor	Athex: ELHA	Basic Resources
Hellenic Petroleum	Athex: ELPE	Integrated Oil and Gas
National Bank of Greece	Athex: ETE	Banks
Eurobank Ergasias	Athex: EUROB	Banks
EYDAP	Athex: EYDAP	Water
GEK Terna	Athex: GEKTERNA	Heavy Construction
OTE	Athex: HTO	Fixed Line Telecommunications
Lamda Development	Athex: LAMDA	Real Estate Holding & Development
Motor Oil Hellas	Athex: MOH	Exploration & Production
Mytilineos Holdings	Athex: MYTIL	Nonferrous Metals
OPAP	Athex: OPAP	Gambling
Autohellas	Athex: OTOEL	Consumer Products & Services
Public Power Corporation	Athex: PPC	Conventional Electricity
Quest Holdings	Athex: QUEST	Technology
Gr. Sarantis S.A.	Athex: SAR	Personal Products
Terna Energy	Athex: TENERGY	Alternative Electricity
Titan Cement	Athex: TITC	Construction Materials and Fixtures
Piraeus Bank	Athex: TPEIR	Banks
Viohalco	Athex: VIO	Diversified Industrials

== Notes and references ==
- "FTSE: Index composition (May 25, 2018)". Hellenic Exchanges Group. 25 May 2018.
- "Symbols of the companies in the Athens Stock Exchange". Hellenic Exchanges.
- "FTSE/Athens Stock Exchange Large Cap Index". Bloomberg.
- "FTSE/ATHEX Index Series Semi-Annual Review". FTSE. 10 November 2014. Archived from the original on 15 January 2015.
- "FTSE/ATHEX Index Series homepage". FTSE. Archived from the original on 15 January 2015.
