= Kokkalis =

Kokkalis feminine: Kokkali is a Greek surname.

- Petros Kokkalis (1896-1962), Greek physician, surgeon
- Petros S. Kokkalis (born 1970), Greek businessman and politician
- Sofia Kokkali (born 1988) Greek actress
- Sokratis Kokkalis (born 1939), Greek businessman
