= Metka ATE =

- Industry: Construction
- Founded: 1962
- Founders: Evangelos Mytilineos
- Headquarters: Athens, Greece
- Area served: International
- Key people: Ioannis Mytilineos (Chairman)
- Revenue: €445.09 million (2016)
- Operating income: €71.09 million (2016)
- Net income: €56.01 million (2016)
- Total assets: €1.145 billion (2016)
- Total equity: €600.53 million (2016)
- Number of employees: ▲471 (2016)
- Divisions: Energy (EPC); Infrastructure; Defence; Industrial; Manufacturing
- Website: www.metka.com

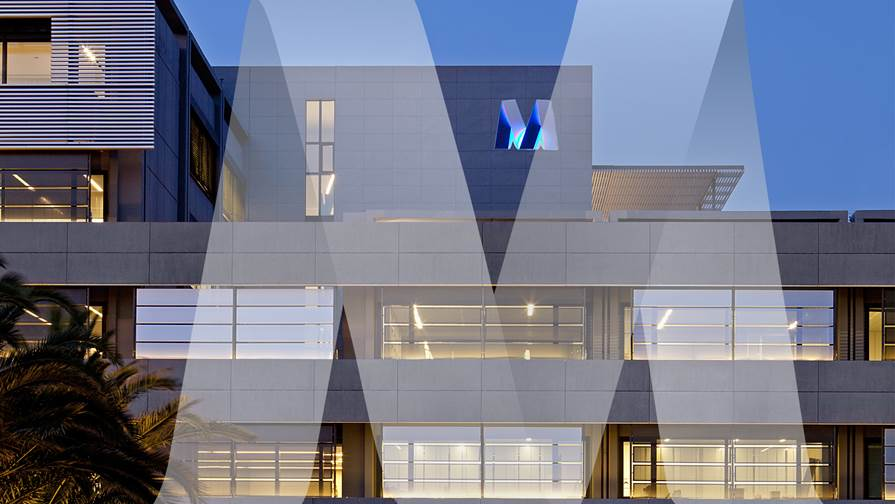

METKA ATE is the business unit of the Greek company Mytilineos S.A., undertaking the construction of large-scale projects in the sectors of energy, infrastructure and defence.

Metka’s main business activity is in construction of large power generation plants, most notably highly efficient combined cycle power plants. The company also has significant industrial manufacturing facilities, which enables it to produce specialized mechanical equipment, fabrications and machinery used in industrial and defence applications.

Metka is also classified in the highest category of construction contractors for major public works projects in Greece.

== History ==
=== 1962–1980 ===
Metka was founded in 1962 by the Hellenic Industrial Development Bank in the port city of Volos, Central Greece.

In 1964 Metka’s manufacturing plant for metal constructions initiated its operation, with its activities relating mainly to the construction of large and sophisticated metal and mechanical projects.

In 1971 Metka was privatized and in 1973 its shares were listed on the Athens Stock Exchange, a move which was followed by acquisitions that enabled Metka to become a contractor for large-scale projects. Metka carries out its first international projects.

=== 1980–1998 ===
In 1980 the company absorbed the technical contracting firm Technom S.A. thus acquiring the capacity to build and assemble items at an industrialized level and obtaining the ability to undertake and implement large-scale public works.

In 1989 followed the acquisition of the “Hellenic Steel Process Industry” (Servisteel) and with its modern automated equipment, Metka could start industrializing metal works (blasting, cutting, drilling).

After 39 consecutive years of operation, Metka opens up to new areas of activity such as: energy, defence, renewable energy sources, exports and refineries.

=== 1998–2009 ===
During the period of July 1998 through to January 1999, Mytilineos gradually acquired a controlling interest in the company and in early 1999 the acquisition was officially completed.

In December 1999, Metka proceeds to a 40% share acquisition of EKME. The company deals mainly with the design and construction of units for petrochemical and power production plants.

In 2006 Metka acquires Elemka, a company specialized in civil engineering applications.

=== 2009–2014 ===
In 2009 takes place the establishment of Power Projects Limited, subsidiary of Metka, in Turkey.

In 2012 Metka opens a Representation Office in Algeria and develops a series of energy projects, particularly with mobile power generating units, on a fast-track basis.

=== 2015–2016 ===
In 2015 Metka establishes a new Representation Office in Ghana, following the company's strategic focus on African markets with booming energy needs.

Also in 2015, Metka establishes the new affiliated company Metka EGN, as a result of the joint venture with Egnatia Group, aiming to further strengthen the company’s portfolio of activities, as well as its positioning on the rapidly growing solar power market.

In 2016 Metka undertakes its second major project in Ghana, in consortium with General Electric, for the engineering, procurement, construction and commissioning of a 192MW combined cycle power plant in Takoradi. New solar and hybrid power EPC contracts for Metka EGN with a total capacity of 75MW.

Also in 2016 a strategic partnership in the off-grid power market with International Power Supply (IPS), the manufacturer of the award-winning all-in-one modular power conversion system EXERON.

=== 2017 ===
In 2017 the merger was announced of Mytilineos Holdings S.A. with its principal subsidiaries Metka S.A., Protergia S.A. and Aluminium of Greece I.C.S.A.

== Operations ==
Metka's main offices are in Athens, Greece with operations in several countries through the Middle East and Africa. The company's industrial facilities are located in the port city of Volos.

Metka focuses mainly on serving the needs of international customers and markets, mainly in Europe, the Middle East and Africa.

== See also ==
- List of Greek Companies
