= Greek National Road 39 =

Trunk road in Greece

Coordinates: 37.1121°N 22.4320°E

National Road 39
- Εθνική Οδός 39
- Route of the EO39 road, in blue

Route information
- Part of E961 (except around Sparta)
- Length: 99.7 km (62.0 mi)
- Existed: 9 July 1963–present

Major junctions
- North end: Tripoli
- South end: Gytheio

Location
- Country: Greece
- Regions: Peloponnese
- Primary destinations: Tripoli; Sparta; Gytheio

Highway system
- Highways in Greece; Motorways; National roads
← EO38	→ EO40

Greek National Road 39 (Greek: Εθνική Οδός 39), abbreviated as the EO39, is a national road in the Peloponnese region of Greece. The road runs between Tripoli and Gytheio, via Sparta, and is mostly part of European route E961.

== Route ==
The EO39 is officially defined as a north–south road through the Peloponnese: from the junction with the EO7 in Tripoli, the road heads south to Gytheio, via Sparta.

Most of EO39 is part of European route E961, except around Sparta due to the policy of E-roads following the highest quality roads available. The EO39 also connects with: the A7 motorway, south of Tripoli; the A71 and EO82 in Sparta; and the EO86 in Dafni.

== History ==
Ministerial Decision G25871 of 9 July 1963 created the EO39 from the old EO60, which existed by royal decree from 1955 until 1963, and followed the same route as the current EO39.

Since 18 April 2016, it is possible to travel between Tripoli and Sparta by motorway instead of using the EO39, but the tolled route is less direct because it requires using the A7 motorway from Tripoli to Megalopolis, then the A71 motorway from there to Sparta.

== See also ==
- European route E961
