= A71 motorway (Greece) =

Road in southern Greece

A71 motorway
- Αυτοκινητόδρομος Α71
- Route of the A71 motorway, in green

Route information
- Length: 46 km (29 mi)

Major junctions
- North end: Megalopolis (A7)
- South end: Sparta

Location
- Country: Greece
- Regions: Peloponnese
- Primary destinations: Megalopolis; Sparta

Highway system
- Highways in Greece; Motorways; National roads
| ← A7 | → A8 |

The A71 motorway, also known as the Lefktro–Sparti branch (Greek: Κλάδος Λεύκτρο–Σπάρτη), is a branch of the A7 motorway from Lefktro near Megalopoli, connecting it with Sparti. The motorway was opened on April 18, 2016. It is a toll road.

== Operation and maintenance ==
Moreas S.A. (Greek: Μορέας Α.Ε) is responsible for the operation and maintenance of both the A7 and A71 motorways, which are sometimes known collectively as the Moreas Motorway (Αυτοκινητόδρομος Μωρέας). The company was founded in Nestani on 22 December 2006, and is a consortium of the Aktor Group (formerly Intrakat) as the majority shareholder (85%) and the Avax Group as the minority (15%): Ellaktor used to own 71.67% of the company, until it sold Aktor Concessions to the Aktor Group in September 2025.

Moreas S.A. operates the A7 and A71 under a 30-year public–private partnership agreement with the Greek government, from 3 March 2008 to 3 March 2038.

== Interchanges ==
The exits of the A71 motorway:

| Regional unit | km | mi | Exit | Name | Destinations | Notes |
|---|---|---|---|---|---|---|
| Arcadia | 0.00 | 0.00 | 14 | Lefktro | A7 / E65 – Kalamata A7 / E65 – Athens, Tripoli | |
| Arcadia | 10.56 | 6.56 | Petrina Toll Station | | | |
| Laconia | 14.70 | 9.13 | 15Ε | Longanikos | Longanikos | |
| Laconia | 22.00 | 13.67 | 15Ε-Α | Agios Konstantinos | Founteika, Agios Konstantinos | |
| Laconia | 28.90 | 17.96 | 16Ε | Pellana | Pellana, Kastoreio | |
| Laconia | 30.00 | 18.64 | Pellana Rest Area | | | |
| Laconia | 44.70 | 27.78 | 17Ε | Sparti | EO39 – Sparta EO39 / E961 – Athens (no tolls) | |
| Laconia | 45.41 | 28.22 | — | — | E961 – Geraki Agriani, Sparta | |
1.000 mi = 1.609 km; 1.000 km = 0.621 mi: Tolled
