= EEY =

EEY may refer to:

- Ελληνική Εταιρεία Υδάτων (Hellenic Water Company), merged into the EYDAP
- EEY, identification code for manual transmission in the Audi C5 powertrain
