= Aktor Group =

Greek construction company

- Native name: Όμιλος Άκτωρ
- Type: Public (Societe Anonyme)
- Traded as: Athex: AKTR
- Industry: Construction
- Founded: 18 December 1987
- Founder: Sokratis Kokkalis
- Headquarters: Paiania, Attica, Greece
- Key people: Feroniki Tzavella (Chairwomen); Alexandros Exarhou (Vice president & CEO)
- Services: Construction, infrastructure projects, renewable energy, environmental projects and real estate development
- Revenue: €214.84 million (2021)
- Operating income: €11.88 million (2021)
- Net income: €(22.58) million (2021)
- Total assets: €365.60 million (2021)
- Total equity: €41.77 million (2021)
- Owner: Winex Investments Limited (34.78%); Castellano Properties Limited (15.74%); Blue Silk Limited (13.63%); Intracom Holdings (5.09%)
- Number of employees: 520 (2021)
- Subsidiaries: IntraDevelopment S.A. Fracasso Hellas S.A. AKTOR

The Aktor Group (Greek: Όμιλος Άκτωρ), formerly known as Intrakat, one of the biggest construction companies in Greece, established in 1987, is involved in large-scale construction projects, including civil engineering, infrastructure, telecom network, renewable energy, environmental and real estate development projects in both the public and private sectors.

Following the delivery of Paros and Karpathos airports (airport terminal, airside), Intrakat has been awarded in March 2017 by Fraport Greece as the contractor to design and built all the refurbishment, remodelling and expansion works in 14 peripheral airports in Greece.

In November 2023, Intrakat acquired Aktor from Ellaktor for a total of €224.8 million ($243.07 million): Intrakat then renamed itself to the Aktor Group, in October 2024. In September 2025, the Aktor Group acquired Aktor Concessions from Ellaktor for €194.6 million ($210.41 million).

== Company structure ==
The Aktor Group has six subsidiaries: Aktor Concessions, Aktor Construction, Aktor Equity Participations, Aktor Real Estate, Aktor Renewables, and Aktor Facility Management. Aktor Concessions became part of the company in September 2025: the remainder were created in October 2024, when Aktor adopted its current name.

=== Motorway concessions ===
As of January 2026, the Aktor Group has a stake in the following motorway and expressway concessions:

- 22.22% of Aegean Motorway, operator of part of the A1 motorway between Raches and Kleidi;
- 27.70% of Gefyra S.A., operator of the Rio–Antirrio Bridge;
- 85% of Moreas, operator of the A7 and A71 motorways; (Note: Until September 2025, the Aktor Group (as Intrakat) owned 13.33% of Moreas.)
- 20.48% of Olympia Odos, operator of the A5 motorway south of Rio, and the A8 motorway;
- 45% of Pasiphae Odos, constructor of the A90 motorway between Hersonissos and Neapoli.

While it was part of Ellaktor, Aktor Concessions owned 65.75% of Attiki Odos S.A., the operator of the Attiki Odos motorway network until 6 October 2024, when the GEK Terna-led Nea Attiki Odos took over the concession.

== Controversies ==
In 2017, Intrakat was fined €18.3 million ($20.67 million) for colluding with other major Greek construction companies for 23 years (1989–2012) to rig the tenders for public work projects in their favour, including projects that received funding from the European Union: Aktor – which Intrakat acquired from Ellaktor in 2023 – was fined €38.5 million ($43.49 million).

In 2026, the Wall Street Journal reported that former US ambassador to Greece Kimberly Guilfoyle travelled on private jets belonging to Greek business figures, including Alexandros Exarchou, head of Aktor.
