= Angelo Dalli =

Maltese computer scientist (born 1978)

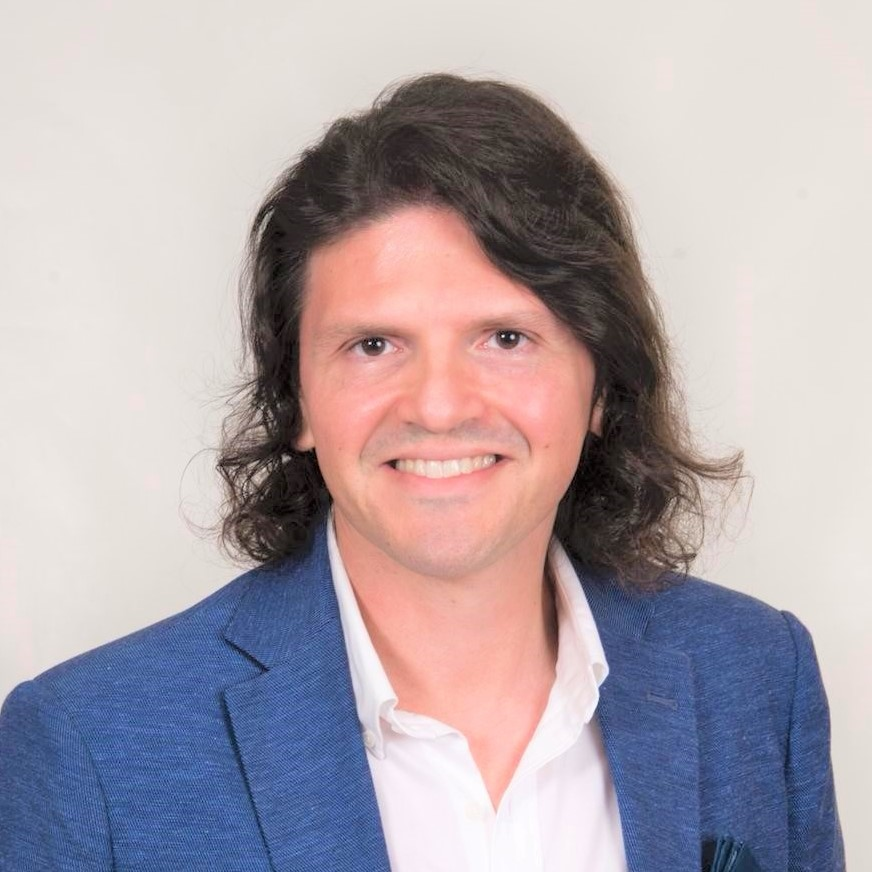
- Dalli in 2018
- Born: 14 April 1978 (age 48); Pietà, Malta
- Education: University of Malta (BSc); University of Malta (MSc); University of Sheffield (PhD)
- Known for: Umnai; Intralot Bit8; Q-Free Traffiko
- Awards: Malta Top Entrepreneur (2019); Malta Top Entrepreneur (2014); International Olympiad in Informatics, Bronze Medal (1995)
- Scientific career
- Fields: Artificial intelligence; natural language processing
- Thesis: Timeline and Named Entity Extraction for Hyperlinked Corpora (2010)
- Doctoral advisor: Yorick Wilks
- Website: medium.com/@angelodalli

Angelo Dalli (born 14 April 1978) is a computer scientist specialising in artificial intelligence, a serial entrepreneur, and business angel investor.

== Early life and education ==
Dalli was born in Malta and grew up in the town of Birżebbuġa. Dalli was educated at the Archbishop's Seminary, Malta and represented Malta in the Young European Environmental Research contest held in Cologne in 1994. Dalli represented Malta in the International Olympiad in Informatics held in Eindhoven in 1995, where he won a bronze medal. Dalli started selling computer software as a teenager, and worked for the International Data Group as a freelance contributor for PC World.

== Academic work ==
After graduating from the University of Malta, Dalli spent time lecturing on artificial intelligence and natural language processing before reading for his PhD at the University of Sheffield under the supervision of Yorick Wilks. Dalli has published over 23 peer reviewed papers in the artificial intelligence and natural language processing fields, including one of the earliest methods on timestamp extraction from documents that is now commonly used in most email applications. Angelo has also contributed to the encoding of European languages in Unicode, in particular for the Common Locale Data Repository.

In the field of Bioinformatics Dalli has found a particularly useful integer sequence (sequence A062208 in the OEIS) which efficiently computes all alignments of strings of length 3 together with other generalisations (sequence A062204 in the OEIS), (sequence A062205 in the OEIS) for applications in natural language and sequence alignment. Dalli has an Erdős number of 3.

Dalli has led the Maltese national informatics team in the International Olympiad in Informatics at IOI 2002 in Seoul, South Korea and IOI 2004 in Athens, Greece.

== Artificial intelligence ==
=== Trustworthy AI and Hybrid Intelligence ===
Angelo has been a vocal proponent of trustworthy AI that impacts society positively and believes that AI should be properly regulated. Angelo has co-founded UMNAI in 2019, with the aim of creating a new form of trustworthy AI that can explain the decisions and steps that the AI has taken to output an answer, based on a neurosymbolic AI architecture that combines neural and symbolic AI in an auditable and certain manner.

=== AI and society ===
Angelo led the Government of Malta taskforce that produced Malta's new AI regulation and national AI strategy, and is an active member of the IEEE, AAAI, ACM and the ACL.

=== AI in transport ===
Angelo had led the introduction of different machine learning techniques in intelligent transport systems (ITS), including parking, controlled vehicle access zones and dynamic traffic interchange control. His intelligent transport company, Traffiko, operated in Europe, Australia and the Middle East, and was eventually sold to Q-Free in Norway in 2015.

=== AI in gaming ===
Angelo is a well known speaker in the online gambling industry.

Angelo setup one of the first companies that applied artificial intelligence in the online gambling industry, called Bit8 (now part of Intralot), with the most notable work being on algorithms that estimate and maximise player lifetime value and personalised bonusing systems. These techniques have since been widely adopted by the online gambling industry Intralot subsequently bought Bit8 in 2017.

=== AI and creativity ===
Angelo has been collaborating various artists and creatives to teach AI about creativity. The results of this collaboration is the UMA AI entity, short for Universal Machine Artist. Angelo has also co-founded the Creative Science and Arts Institute to act as a foundation for future research into AI, science, technology and creativity.

UMA is creating original artwork using a modified Generative adversarial network has a third component, the human artist, to produce different learning results than standard generative AI models. The underlying discriminator in UMA started from an anti-fraud detection system and has now gradually evolved to add stable diffusion and procedural generation methods.

The first two artworks generated by UMA were auctioned in October and November 2018 respectively, with all proceeds donated to charity and good causes.

Ongoing work in improving UMA and furthering collaboration with other artists is ongoing. Notable exhibitions include Tomorrow's Blossoms with Selina Scerri at Esplora Museum in 2024, which explored the theme of AI and emotions.

== Angel investor ==
Angelo is an angel investor active in the high-tech startup scene, and is a member of EBAN, and World Business Angel Forum senator. Angelo has been encouraging Maltese startups via various public events including the Zest and Budding Rockstars conferences and co-founded BAM, the Malta Business Angel network, in 2019.

== Awards and honours ==
=== Entrepreneurial and scientific ===
- Bronze Medal, International Olympiad in Informatics (1995)
- Malta Top Entrepreneur Award (2019)
- Malta Top Entrepreneur Award (2014)
- WIPO IP Enterprise Award for the UMNAI Neuro-symbolic AI architecture (2022)

=== Corporate awards ===
- Intralot Bit8 EGR Rising Star Award (2014)
- Intralot Bit8 Malta Communication Authority eBusiness Award for the Best B2B application (2015)
- Intralot Bit8 Malta iGaming Award for Excellence (2017)
