= Karelia Tobacco Company =

International tobacco company centered in Kalamata, Greece

Karelia Tobacco Company, Inc.
- Type: Public incorporated company
- Traded as: Athex: KARE
- Industry: Tobacco
- Founded: 1888
- Headquarters: Kalamata, Greece
- Area served: Worldwide
- Key people: Andreas G. Karelias, (Managing Director)
- Products: Cigarettes, Rolling papers, Cigarillos
- Revenue: €1.035 billion (2019)
- Operating income: €108.18 million (2019)
- Net income: €67.4 million (2019)
- Total assets: €619.48 million (2019)
- Total equity: €513.01 million (2019)
- Owner: Ioanna Karelia (31.96%); Andreas Karelias (21.59%); Efstathios Karelias (20.94%); Spyropoulou Asimina (12.82%); George & Victoria Karelia Foundation (7.15%)
- Number of employees: 565 (2024)
- Subsidiaries: Karelia Tobacco Company (U.K.) Ltd. Karelia Bulgaria EOOD; GK Distributors EOOD; Karelia Tütün ve Ticaret A.S. Meridian S.A. Duty Free Specialists; Karelia Investment; Karelia Belgium
- Website: www.karelia.gr

Karelia Tobacco Company Inc. (Karelia) is an international tobacco company headquartered in the city of Kalamata, Greece. It is also the country's largest tobacco manufacturer and exporter of fine tobacco products.

Karelia brands are sold in more than 65 countries around the globe in Western and Eastern Europe, the Far East, the Middle East, the Persian Gulf and Africa. Its brands include George Karelias and Sons, Karelia Slims, Omé, Karelia Family, Karelia Royal, Rex, American Legend and Leader. The Company produces an average of 15 billion cigarettes per year and employs approximately 500 people worldwide.

Karelia has a primary listing on the Athens Stock Exchange (KARE).

== History ==
=== 1888 to 1991 ===
The company's roots date back to 1888, when the first generation of the Karelia family established itself as a small tobacco business in Kalamata, Greece. Its activities were largely regional in the first few decades of its operations, until the political and economic outlook in the country became more stable allowing Karelia to expand the markets for its brands on a nationwide level. From the 1950s until today, numerous Karelia brands have gained popularity resulting in a wide circulation and substantial market share in all of Greece. The corporate headquarters and manufacturing facilities have been traditionally located in Kalamata, and since 1971 have been situated in the current premises that were built, totaling an area of 80,000 square meters. The sales and marketing offices are located in the Karelia Building in Athens. The company entered the Athens Stock Exchange in 1976, and was publicly traded under the name Karelia Brothers. That same year, Karelia became the Greek licensed manufacturer for RJ Reynolds (currently Japan Tobacco International), by producing and distributing the brand Winston, and subsequently in 1981, with the Camel brand. Since the early 1990s the group has been transformed from a predominantly Greek company into an international group. In 1991 the company adopted its current name, the Karelia Tobacco Company Inc. In 1994 Karelia established an office in Sofia, Bulgaria. Karelia's wholly owned subsidiary Meridian Duty Free Specialists, a shipchandling company was acquired in 1995 and Karelia Belgium was established. Karelia Investment was established in 1997.

=== 2000 to present ===
In the year 2000, Karelia ended its cooperation with Japan Tobacco International, in order to concentrate on developing its own trademark brands. In 2003, the company established a subsidiary in the UK called Karelia Tobacco Company (UK) Ltd. for the distribution of its brands in that market. In 2007, the subsidiary in Bulgaria was upgraded to a commercial import company called Karelia Bulgaria EOOD, and then its subsidiary GK Distributors EOOD was established. In 2008, a subsidiary was established in Turkey, called Karelia Tütün ve Tiçaret A.S. In that same year, Karelia acquired the Backwoods cigar brand from Altadis S.A., for the Greek domestic and duty free markets. Today, Karelia Tobacco Company is Greece's largest cigarette manufacturer and exporter. It operates offices all over Greece, and distributes its brands to a sales network covering more than 26,000 points of sale. Its current annual sales turnover is 876 million euros.

== Products ==
The company's brands include:

=== Cigarettes ===
- George Karelias and Sons Excellence
- George Karelias and Sons
- Karelia Slims
- Omé
- Rex
- Karelia Family
- Karelia Blue
- Karelia White
- Karelia Royal
- Karelia Yellow
- American Legend
- Leader
- Traditional brands: Karelia Filter Kasetina, Karelia Agriniou, Rex

=== Roll Your Own - Hand Rolling Tobacco ===
- George Karelias and Sons
- Oriental Mist

=== Rolling papers ===
- George Karelias and Sons Cigarette Papers
- George Karelias and Sons Ciel

=== Cigarillos ===
- Backwoods Authentic and Blue 5S (acquired from Altadis S.A. for the Greek domestic and duty free markets).

== Operations ==
=== Branches ===
More than 87% of the company's production is directed to international markets, classifying Karelia as one of Greece's largest export businesses. The Company's total output is produced entirely at its facilities in Kalamata. In addition to the headquarters located in Kalamata and its international subsidiaries, Karelia operates two branches in Athens (Megaron Karelia Building) and Thessaloniki.

=== Executive Management ===
Victoria G. Karelias, Chairwoman of the Board
Stathis G. Karelias, Vice Chairman of the Board
Andrew G. Karelias, Managing Director

=== Corporate Social Responsibility and Sponsorships ===
Karelia has a long history of providing support to organizations and activities in its local community. Many donations help to support schools, municipal health centers including the local hospital, youth organizations, the disabled and art, music and other cultural activities. Karelia has been a longstanding benefactor of initiatives promoting Greek culture and civilization with the specific support of organizations preserving Greek regional & national song, dance and costume.
