= European Reliance =

Greek insurance company

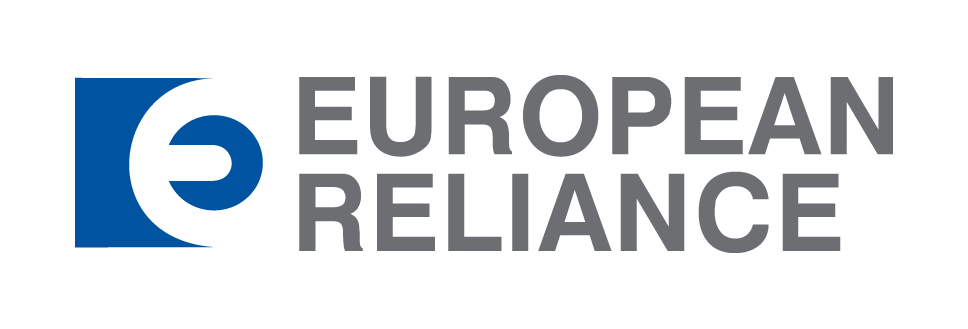
- Industry: Insurance
- Founded: 1977
- Headquarters: Athens, Greece
- Products: Commercial insurance
- Revenue: ▲€223.3 million (2020)
- Website: Official website

European Reliance General Insurance Co. (Greek: Ευρωπαϊκή Πίστη Α.Ε.Γ.Α) is a Greek insurance company which is based in Athens, Greece.

== History ==
Founded in 1977, it is one of the largest insurance companies in Greece. It is listed on the Athens Stock Exchange and has as a slogan the phrase "Pays immediately", which expresses how it prioritizes consistency at the difficult moments.

The Company manages a portfolio of more than 650,000 insurance policies, a turnover of more than € 223 million and an investment portfolio that exceeds € 408 million, with A− to AA+ credit rating. Over the past 43 years, it has zero overdue debts, a high solvency ratio and sufficient insurance reserves.

With a sales network that counts more than 5,600 Insurance Agents and more than 110 Retail Offices, serving the needs of more than 662,972 contracts, the Company stands strong in the Greek insurance market, to meet its obligations, according to client's requests.

In February 2022, it was announced the German multinational financial services company, Allianz, had acquired 72% of European Reliance for €207 million.
