= Jumbo S.A. =

Greek supermarket

Jumbo
- Type: Public
- Traded as: Athex: BELA
- Industry: Retail
- Founded: 1986
- Headquarters: Moschato, Greece
- Key people: Apostolos E. Vakakis (Chairman)
- Revenue: € 1.232.904.830 (2025)
- Operating income: €172.12 million (2020)
- Net income: €320.309.417 (2020)
- Total assets: €1.872.429.412 (2025)
- Total equity: €1.219 billion (2020)
- Owner: Apostolos Vakakis (19.36%)
- Number of employees: 7,232 (2025)
- Website: Official website

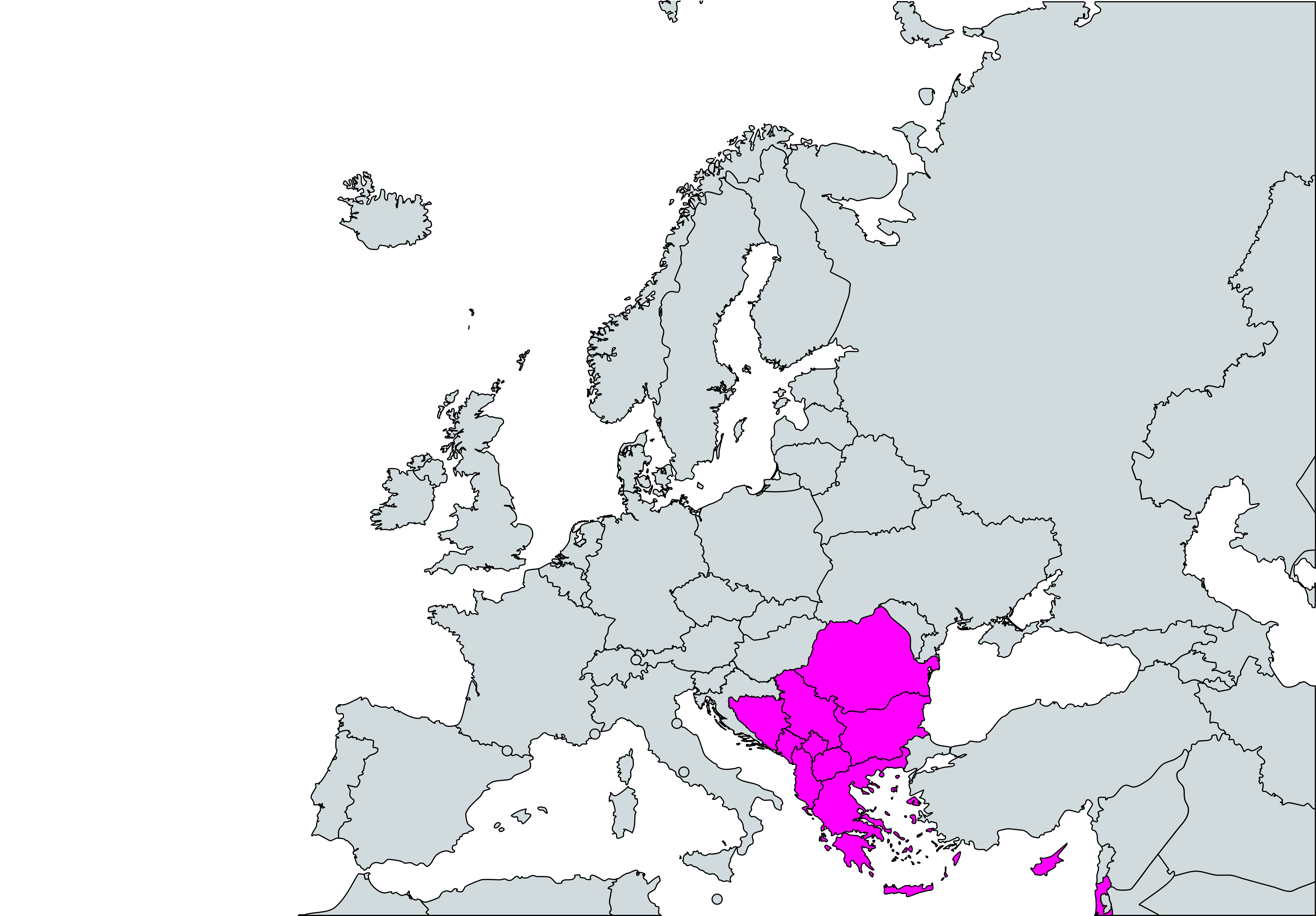
Countries that have Jumbo store.

Jumbo Anonymi Etairia is a Greek company whose main operation is retail sale of toys, baby items, seasonal items, decoration items, books and stationery. The company was incorporated in 1986 and has its headquarters in Moschato, part of the Athens Urban Area.

Jumbo Group operates 87 stores, 55 of which are located in Greece, 6 in Cyprus, 10 in Bulgaria and 16 in Romania. Furthermore, by 2025, the company had franchise agreements for 27 stores under the Jumbo brand in seven countries; with Balfin Group in Albania, Bosnia and Herzegovina, Kosovo and Montenegro, Veropoulos in North Macedonia and Serbia, and Fox Group in Israel. In 2026, Fox Group announced plans to bring the Jumbo brand to Canada through the acquisition of a former Toys "R" Us store.

The company has been listed on the Athens Exchange since July 19, 1997, and since June 2010 it has participated in the FTSE/Athex 20 index.

== Countries with Jumbo branches ==
Country	Year Opened	Number of stores
Greece	1986	55
Romania	2013	18
Bulgaria	2007	10
Albania	2011	9
Kosovo	2014	7
Bosnia and Herzegovina	2017	7
Cyprus	1991	6
Serbia	2016	6
Israel	2023	5
North Macedonia	2010	4
Montenegro	2019	4
