= Avin International =

- Company type: private
- Industry: Shipping
- Founded: 1977
- Headquarters: Maroussi, Athens, Greece
- Area served: Europe, Africa, South America
- Key people: Giannis Vardinogiannis (President); George A. Mylonas (CEO)
- Products: Petroleum; Gas
- Services: Oil & Gas transportation
- Parent: Motor Oil Hellas
- Website: www.avin.gr

Avin International S.A. is active in the transportation of crude oil, gas and petroleum products. Avin is one of the world's independent shipment oil operators owned by the Vardinoyannis family.

== Other activities ==
The company has been active in undertaking various shipbuilding programs, in USA, Split, Japan, Ukraine, South Korea, and recently China.

== See also ==
- Energy in Greece
