= Petros Kokkalis =

Secretary of Health and Social Welfare in the Provisional Democratic Government
- In office 1947–1949

Personal details
- Born: September 18, 1896 Livadeia, Greece
- Died: January 15, 1962 (aged 65) East Berlin, German Democratic Republic
- Party: Communist Party of Greece
- Spouse: Niki Kouletsi
- Children: Socrates Kokkalis; Avgi-Polyxeni Kokkalis
- Parent(s): Socrates Kokkalis (1856–1944); Polyxeni Nakou (1866–1937)
- Relatives: Petros S. Kokkalis (grandson)
- Education: University of Athens; Humboldt University of Berlin
- Occupation: Physician, surgeon, professor
- Known for: Advances in thoracic surgery; pioneering heart and lung transplantation

Petros Kokkalis (Greek: Πέτρος Κόκκαλης; 18 September 1896 – 15 January 1962) was a distinguished professor of medicine in the University of Athens has been one of the leading figures of Medicine in pre WWII Greece, introducing pioneering methods in thoracic surgery and neurosurgery. His main medical achievements include the introduction of thoracoplasty in Greece and removal of the phrenic nerve for the treatment of tuberculosis, as well as the first pneumonectomy with the Tourniquet method and the first pericardiectomy for the release of compressive pericarditis.
