= Viohalco =

Greek Heavy Industry Corporation

- Type: Public
- Traded as: Athex: VIO; Euronext: VIO
- ISIN: BE0974271034
- Industry: Metals, manufacturing
- Founded: 1937
- Headquarters: Brussels, Belgium
- Key people: Nikolaos Stassinopoulos (Chairman)
- Products: Aluminium, Copper, Steel, Steel Pipes, Cables, Technology and R&D, Recycling and waste management services, Real estate development.
- Revenue: €5.375 billion (2021)
- Operating income: €514.29 million (2021)
- Net income: €219.99 million (2021)
- Total assets: €5.238 billion (2021)
- Total equity: €1.656 billion (2021)
- Owner: Ippokratis I. Stasinopoulos (30.31%); Nikolaos Stassinopoulos (27.43%); Evangelos Stassinopoulos (19.20%); Michail Stassinopoulos (7.01%)
- Number of employees: 9,782 (2021)
- Website: www.viohalco.com

Viohalco S.A. (Greek: Βιοχάλκο Α.Ε.) (Viomichania Chalkou kai Alouminiou Company), a Greek heavy industry corporation, was established in 1937, made its debut on the Athens Stock Exchange in 1947 and is included in the FTSE/Athex Large Cap stock exchange index. The company is composed of tens of different companies active in the metal production, steel and aluminum trade. Its president, Nikos Stasinopoulos, is one of the richest businessmen in Greece. The magnitude of this corporation is visible in the fact that 7 percent of Greek exports are made by it. Viohalco’s overall sales for 2021 came to around 5.4 billion euros, with profits of 220 million euros.

Viohalco has heavily invested in Romania, Bulgaria and the UK, and recently achieved a major deal in steel manufacturing with a US-based company. Among the company’s publicly stated plans are the development of operations in Russia and Serbia and the construction of an energy plant in mainland Greece by early 2010. Viohalco is a large land owner in Greece and in the Balkans. There has been talk of the eventual creation of a real estate division or company by Viohalco.

In 2013, Viohalco moved its headquarters from Athens to Brussels. On 22 November 2013 it was listed on Euronext Brussels.
