= A7 motorway (Greece) =

Motorway in Greece

A7 motorway
- Αυτοκινητόδρομος Α7
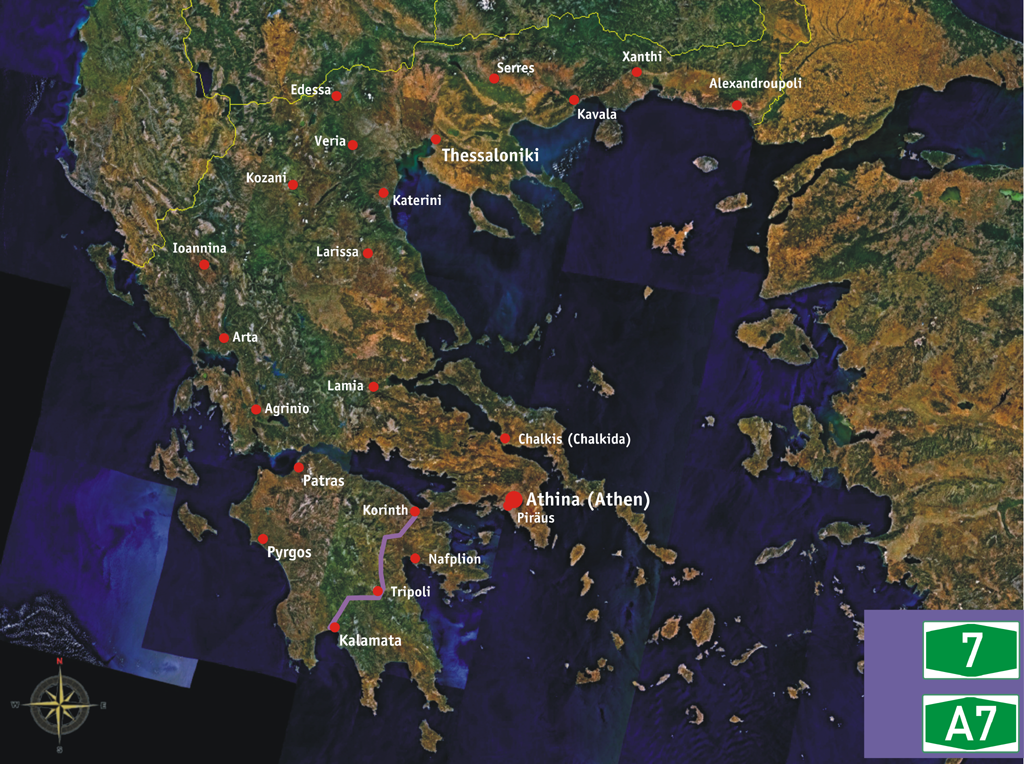

Route information
- Part of E55 (Tsakona–Kalamata) and E65
- Length: 205 km (127 mi)

Major junctions
- North end: Corinth
- South end: Kalamata

Location
- Country: Greece
- Regions: Peloponnese
- Primary destinations: Corinth; Tripoli; Megalopolis; Tsakona; Kalamata

Highway system
- Highways in Greece; Motorways; National roads
| ← A65 | → A71 |

The A7 motorway, also known as the Moreas Motorway, or the Corinth–Tripoli–Kalamata Motorway (Greek: Αυτοκινητόδρομος Κόρινθος–Τρίπολη–Καλαμάτα), is a controlled-access highway in the Peloponnese, Greece. The A7 begins just west of the Isthmus of Corinth, branching off from Greek National Road 8A (which is now integrated into the Olympia Odos). It connects Corinth and Kalamata via Tripoli.

As part of the concession agreement between the Greek state and the consortium operating the motorway (Moreas S.A.), the latter is responsible for constructing, operating, maintaining and modernizing the A7. In existing sections of the motorway, improvements include the straightening of dangerous curves, constructing new tunnels, completing the Artemision tunnel, adding more light fixtures and upgrading the median throughout.

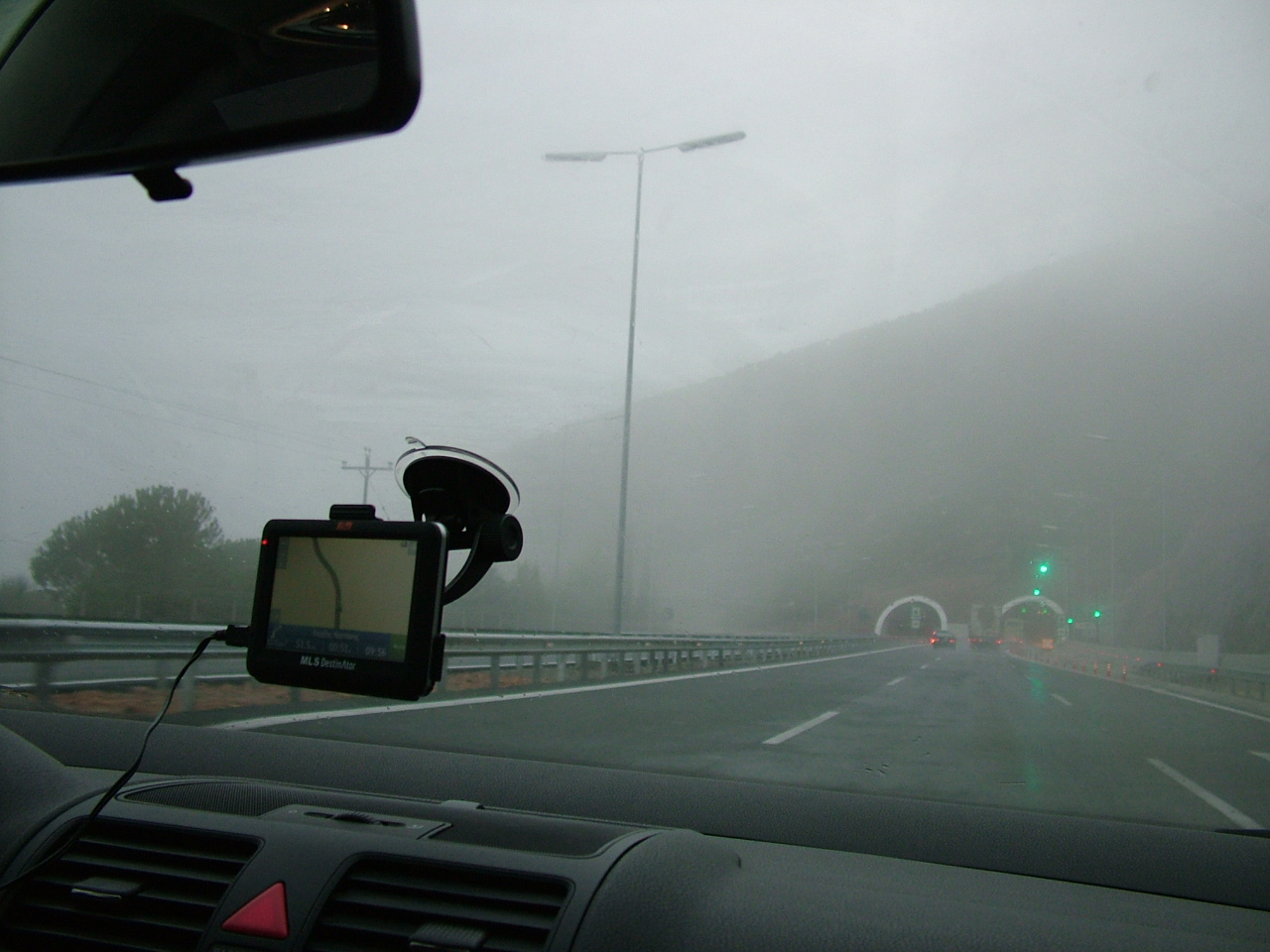
Moreas Motorway.

== Length ==
- Corinth to Tripoli: 74 km (46 mi)
- Corinth to Kalamata: 147 km (91 mi)
- Lefktro to Sparta: 45,5 km (28 mi)
- Total length: 205 km (127 mi)

== History and additional information ==
The Corinth-Tripoli segment was constructed between 1984 and 1990. It officially became part of the Greek road network in 1992. Prior to that, Greek National Road 7 was the only road connecting Corinth and Tripoli via Nemea / Dervenakia, Argos and Achladokampos. This was a two-lane road with dangerous curves, especially in the "Kolosoúrtis" (Κωλοσούρτης) section west of Myli; the road exists to this day and is open to local traffic. The A7 motorway has been credited with spearheading Tripoli's economic growth. The southern end is also the ring road of Kalamata city, distributing to the local agriculture and industrial economy, as well. In the late months of 2016 the road became fully operative from one end to the other.

== Operation and maintenance ==
Moreas S.A. (Greek: Μορέας Α.Ε) is responsible for the operation and maintenance of both the A7 and A71 motorways, which are sometimes known collectively as the Moreas Motorway (Αυτοκινητόδρομος Μωρέας). The company was founded in Nestani on 22 December 2006, and is a consortium of the Aktor Group (formerly Intrakat) as the majority shareholder (85%) and the Avax Group as the minority (15%): Ellaktor used to own 71.67% of the company, until it sold Aktor Concessions to the Aktor Group in September 2025.

Moreas S.A. operates the A7 and A71 under a 30-year public–private partnership agreement with the Greek government, from 3 March 2008 to 3 March 2038.
