= Vardinogiannis family =

Greek family

The Vardinogiannis family (Greek: Βαρδινογιάννης) is one of the most powerful families in the shipping world both in Greece and internationally, originating from Crete.

== Information ==
Members of the Vardinoyannis family have distinguished themselves in shipping, business, politics and the Armed Forces. The family's origins are from Sfakia, specifically from the village of Mountros in Rethymno, while in the early 20th century they settled in the Episkopi Lappaion in Rethymno. According to estimates, the total wealth of the family is close to 11 billion euros and it is among the 50 richest families in Europe. During the period of Turkish rule, based in the autonomous Sfakia, the ancestors of the family played a leading role in various revolutionary movements, while after the unification of Crete with Greece they distinguished themselves mainly as officers of the Navy.

Since the 1960s, when Nikos Vardinoyannis created the ship supply station at Kaloi Limenes in Crete and the Motor Oil refinery, they have also been in a dominant position in Greek business.

The patriarch of the family is considered to be Vardis Papadakis or Pasaramantis, who was hanged in 1833 by the Egyptians of Muhammad Ali of Egypt, father of Ibrahim, for leading a revolutionary movement. In 1877-78, Yannis Vardinakis led a Cretan uprising against the Ottomans and since then, in his honor, the family surname has been changed to Vardinoyannis.

Pavlos Vardinoyannis was involved in politics, initially elected with the Liberal Party of Sofoklis Venizelos and then with the Center Union of Georgios Papandreou. The family owned the largest share of Panathinaikos FC from 1979 to 2012. In addition to their business activities, they also participate in charitable events, while members of the family were also active in the Navy Movement. A relative of the family (nephew of Chrysi Theodoroulaki, wife of Ioannis Vardinoyannis) was the vice-admiral and head of the General Staff, Georgios Theodoroulakis.

== The Vardinoyannis Group ==
The first company of the group was SEKA, founded in 1963 in Kaloi Limenes, Crete, through a joint venture between the Vardinoyannis family, Mobil Corporation and Aristotle Onassis, to operate a marine fuel supply station for ships passing through the eastern Mediterranean. This was followed by the establishment of a lubricants production unit that evolved into the current refineries of MOTOR OIL HELLAS, in Agioi Theodoroi in Corinth.

The Vardinoyannis group currently comprises many companies and businesses both in Greece and abroad. These companies operate in various sectors such as, among others: shipping, oil refineries (Motor Oil Hellas), petroleum distribution (Avin and Shell plc), ship refueling (SEKA), hotels (Athens Plaza), finance, media (STAR, ALPHA), sports, dealerships (Ferrari cars), entertainment (cinemas) and shopping malls.

== Notable people ==
- Giannis Vardinakis or Vardinoyannis (?-?), patriarch of the family
- Nikos Koundouros (1926-2017), great-grandson of Giannis Vardinakis or Vardinoyannis
- Vardis Vardinogiannis (1931-2024), Greek oil and shipping tycoon
- Yiorgos Vardinogiannis (1936-2026), Greek shipping magnate
- Marianna Vardinogiannis (1937-2023), wife of Vardis Vardinogiannis
- Giannis Vardinogiannis (born 1962), son of Vardis Vardinogiannis
- Olga Kefalogianni (born 1975), daughter of Ioannis Kefalogiannis and wife Eleni Vardinogiannis, niece of Vardis Vardinogiannis
- Chrysí Vardinogiánni (born 1981), daughter of Yiorgos Vardinogiannis
