= Corinth Refinery =

Oil refinery in Greece

Corinth Refinery(Διυλιστήρια Κορίνθου)
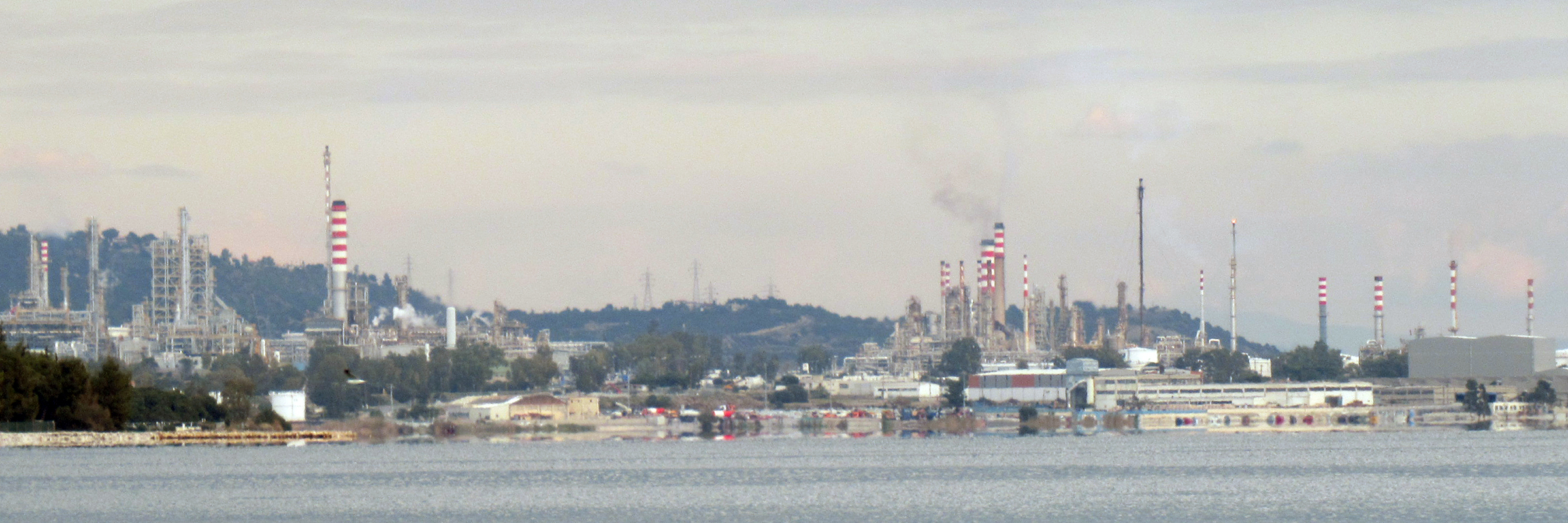
- Interactive map of Corinth Refinery(Διυλιστήρια Κορίνθου)
- Location: Corinth, Peloponnese, Greece; 37.9222°N 23.0707°E

Refinery details
- Operator: Motor Oil Hellas
- Owner: Motor Oil Hellas
- Opened: 1970
- Capacity: 255,000 barrels per day (40,500 m^{3}/d)
- No. of employees: Refinery approx. 2,000 (2015)

Corinth Refinery is an oil refining complex in Greece, the largest industrial complex in the country with a capacity of 255,000 barrels per day (40,500 m^{3}/d), and it is operated by Motor Oil Hellas.

== Facilities ==
=== Fuels production ===
Crude oil is processed in the crude distillation unit, from which liquified petroleum gas (LPG), naphtha, kerosene, diesel and fuel oil are produced. Kerosene and Diesel are further treated mainly in order to remove sulfur thus complying with the required specifications and to produce jet fuel and diesel fuel respectively (both automotive and heating grades).

=== Gasoline production ===
Naphtha is treated to produce gasoline of a high octane number, eliminating the need for adding tetraethyllead to gasoline.

=== Hydrocracker complex ===
This unit is the most recent investment project undertaken by the Company the capital expenditure of which amounted to € 350 million completed in 2005. The operation of the Hydrocracker enabled the production of the new clean fuels with low sulfur content according to the specifications of the European Union effective as of 2005 and 2009 (Auto Oil II). Furthermore, the unit contributed decisively to the improvement of the environmental conditions at the Refinery as the emissions from Fluid catalytic cracking (FCC) were drastically reduced.

=== Fluid catalytic cracking complex ===
Atmospheric Fuel Oil is fed to the FCC complex to produce LPG, Gasoline, Diesel, and Fuel Oil. Parts of the LPGs are sent to downstream units and are converted into high quality gasoline components.

=== Lubricants production ===
Atmospheric Fuel Oil is also fed to the Lubes Vacuum Unit. After a series of processes in order to improve properties of the lubricants, such as viscosity index, pour point, cloud point, the final base lubes are produced and stored. Additionally, asphalt can be produced from the Lubes vacuum unit, whereas the bottoms of both vacuum units are routed to the visbreaker for further upgrading and production of fuel oil.

== See also ==
- Aspropyrgos Refinery
