= European route E961 =

Road in trans-European E-road network

E961

Route information
- Length: 101 km (63 mi)

Major junctions
- North end: Tripoli
- South end: Gytheio

Location
- Countries: Greece

Highway system
- International E-road network; A Class; B Class

European route E961 is a Class B European route in the Greek regional units of Arcadia and Laconia, running from Tripoli to Gytheio. Introduced as part of the original alignment of the E65 in 1983, it is part of the International E-road network, a network of main roads in Europe.

== History ==
The E961 was originally part of the E65, a reference Class A European route that at the time ran from Ystad in the north to Gytheio in the south (instead of Malmö and Chania respectively), via Poland, Czechoslovakia, Hungary and Yugoslavia: the E65 was introduced with the current E-road network, which was finalised on 15 November 1975 and implemented on 15 March 1983.

On 12 September 1986, the Tripoli–Gytheio section of the E65 was spun off to form the current E961. The southern end of the E65 was then revised to terminate at the E75 at Chania, via Kalamata and Kissamos.

== Route ==
According to the 2016 revision of the European Agreement on Main International Traffic Arteries (AGR), the E961 is a branch of the E65 that currently runs from Tripoli in the north to Gytheio in the south, via Sparta. In relation to the national road network, the E961 currently follows the EO39 road (and not the A71 motorway, which terminates at Megalopolis instead of Tripoli) for almost its entire length: it only deviates from the EO39 around Sparta, where a higher-quality bypass to the east of the city was built.

== See also ==
- International E-road network in Greece
