= Sokratis Kokkalis =

Greek businessman

- Σωκράτης Κόκκαλης
- Born: 27 May 1939 (age 87); Athens, Greece
- Education: Humboldt University, Berlin
- Occupation: Businessman
- Years active: 1964-
- Board member of: Founder, chairman, CEO, and major shareholder of Intracom Holdings; Founder, and chairman of Intralot
- Children: 3, including Petros S. Kokkalis
- Father: Petros Kokkalis

Sokratis Kokkalis (Greek: Σωκράτης Κόκκαλης; born 27 May 1939) is a Greek businessman, founder and principal shareholder of Intracom Holdings.

He was the son of Petros Kokkalis and spent his youth as a political refugee in East Germany until 1965, when he relocated permanently to Greece. During the 1990s and 2000s, the company was a significant business entity in Greece, becoming the primary supplier to the public sector, particularly in the nascent IT. The company's portfolio includes the modernization of the Greek telecommunications network, the installation of the national "TAXIS" tax system, the online computer network of OPAP, the network infrastructure for mobile telephony providers, participation in joint ventures as suppliers of IT equipment for the 2004 Athens Olympics, and involvement in significant railway infrastructure and road construction projects for the public sector.

However, he became more widely known to the general public with the acquisition of Olympiacos in 1993, which occurred during a challenging period for the club. Over the course of his ten-year tenure as president, he was instrumental in revitalizing Olympiacos and establishing the foundation for the club's subsequent success on the European stage.

In 2001, he was ranked 421st on the Forbes list of the 500 richest individuals in the world, with an estimated net worth of US$1.2 billion. He was subjected to considerable criticism for the opaque and gratuitous contracts he concluded with state organizations, as reported by the media. On several occasions, he was faced with criminal prosecutions, which were ultimately dismissed. Due to his close association with state-dependent enterprises, he was derisively referred to as "the supplier of the Nation". Kokkalis was also associated more than any other businessman of the period 1980-2000 with the phenomenon of political corruption (|interwoven interests, embezzlement) in the country.

== Personal life ==
Socratis Kokkalis was born in Athens on 27 May 1939. He was the first child of Petros Kokkalis, a prominent physician, and Niki Kouletsi, an academic teacher. He also had a sister, Avgi-Polyxeni.

He spent part of his childhood in Fourna, Evritania, where his father was a member of the Political Committee of National Liberation (PEEA) as "Secretary of Social Welfare" and temporarily that of "Education" of the so-called "Government of the Mountain". At the end of the German occupation the family will settle in Athens again, but his parents' participation in the Greek Civil War on the side of the Greek Democratic Army will force them to flee to communist Belgrade, where the children will settle in Bulkeszi to go to school and the father will take part in the Civil War as a member of the Provisional Democratic Government.

The family were reunited in 1949 when they settled in Romania as political refugees. In 1955 the family leaves Romania for East Berlin, where his father is appointed "Director of Experimental Surgery of the Circulatory System" of the German Academy of Sciences. At the end of his secondary education, he will be registered as a student at the Faculty of Physics of the Mikhail Lomonosov State University. Ηe will complete his studies at Humboldt University from which he will receive a degree in physics specializing in telecommunications and electronic technology. Ιn 1963 begins working as an electronic engineer at the Deutscher Fernsehfunk.

Socratis Kokkalis returned to Greece for a while on the occasion of his father's death. The surgeon died on Monday 15 January 1962 and following a request from his wife, which was accepted by the then Prime Minister Konstantinos Karamanlis, his body was buried on 28 January 1962 at the First Cemetery of Athens.

In 1965, he was able to settle in Greece, after he managed, with the help of the MP of the Centre Union, Athanasios Papageorgiou, to benefit from the favorable regulations for political refugees ^{a} implemented by the government of Georgios Papandreou and regain Greek citizenship. From this period onwards he started his business activity between East Germany and Greece.

He married twice, the first time in 1969 to Sophia Skouras, daughter of Spyros Skouras, owner of the film company "Skouras Film", and relative of Spyros Skouras. whom they acquired Petros Kokkalis in 1970. In a second marriage he married Eleni Farmaki-Kokkali. They have two sons Konstantinos and Socrates Jr. Socratis Kokkalis Jr. died on 14 July 2018, aged 34, in Cleveland, US, having consumed cocaine adulterated with heroin and fentanyl.

== Business ==
Sokratis Kokkalis commenced business operations in Greece in 1967. The son of Petros Kokkalis was embraced by the business community in the country, particularly those linked with the Center Union party. One of them was Aris Voudouris. "Boudouris-Kokkalis OHG" was established in February 1967, under the trade name "GIMEX", focusing on the trade of electrical engineering and transportation machinery. The company represented East German companies "RTF" and "Elektrotechnik". During that period, they finalized significant agreements, including providing telephone sets and coupling stations to the PPC network. Additionally, in 1976-77, they delivered excavators and bunkers for the extensive lignite mine in Ptolemaida, which was constructed by the East German export organization "Machinen Export" with a total value of approximately 100 million DDM.

The collaboration between the two entities came to an end in 1974, when irreconcilable differences resulted in the dissolution of the company. Kokkalis retained "RTF" and "Elektrotechnik" and proceeded to establish a new company, "INTEGRA", with Konstantinos Dimitriadis, a mechanical engineer, as a partner. Thanks to his contacts he achieved a fairly high turnover. His main clients are OTE and, in the electrical equipment sector, PPC.

In 1977, along with Dimitriadis and with the approval of AHB Elektrotecnik's director, Roland Winkler, he established "INTRAKOM S.A." The company commenced operations with just 10 staff members who they assembled Elektrotecnik's telecommunications components and an initial capital of 5 million drachma. KKE was among the initial clients. From 1977 to 1982, the company diversified into the design, development, and manufacture of telecommunications products and systems, consistently reinvesting almost all of its yearly earnings.

The ascension of the Left to power in 1981, which saw the election of PASOK, led to a unique and privileged relationship between Sokratis Kokkalis and the new government officials. Given his father's background and the connections he had fostered with the Centre Union, many of whose members, led by Prime Minister Andreas Papandreou, had aligned with PASOK in the post-war era, the businessman was regarded as a supportive figure by the new government, which extended him a favourable treatment.

The significant business opportunity for Sokratis Kokkalis arose in the mid-1980s with the decision to modernize and digitize the Greek national telecommunications network. In accordance with the 1977 legislation, multinational companies were permitted to bid for government contracts if they held at least 30% of their shares in a Greek company. In this context, INTRAKOM started a multi-year partnership with SIEMENS. The agreements with OTE generated revenues of approximately GRD 560 billion or EUR 1.65 billion for Siemens and Intracom. It is estimated that, including the extensions of the contracts, particularly after 1997, the total revenue eventually reached approximately EUR 2 billion, with Intracom generating approximately EUR 1.1 billion and Siemens approximately EUR 900 million.

Kokkalis' subsequent strategic initiative was the establishment of the subsidiary "INTRALOT" in 1992. In 1993, it commenced operations with OPAP under circumstances that again prompted concerns about the transparency of the contractual arrangements and led to judicial investigations into the procurement process. In 1993, INTRALOT assumed responsibility for the production, management, operation, and promotion of KSISTO in a joint venture with "Scientific Games". It is estimated that through KSISTO, Kokkalis's subsidiary managed approximately 800 billion drachmas between 1993 and 2003, when the contract expired. In 1999, Intralot's subsidiary, "Betting Company S.A.", assumed responsibility for the management and operation of OPAP's football betting business, including the provision of necessary equipment. The 'PAME STOIXIMA' became OPAP's most popular game, generating significant revenue for both Intralot and OPAP.

It is notable that in 2000, the total turnover of the group was 242.1 million, with the parent company generating 30.4 million in revenue.
In 2003, the group's turnover reached 316.6 million, with 109 million generated by the parent company, 102.4 million by KSISTO, 148.3 million by PAME STOIXIMA and 41.2 million from international operations.

In 2013, Kokkalis opted to relinquish his position on the board of directors of Intracom. Concurrently, his son, Konstantinos (Dinos) Kokkalis, was appointed to the board. In 2013, he also relinquished his role as chairman of the group. Dimitris Klonis, who had been an executive of the group since 1994, was appointed as the group's new chairman. This was interpreted by market participants as a strategic withdrawal from business operations, a move that was seen as paving the way for the succession of his two sons, Konstantinos and Sokratis. The untimely demise of Sokratis Kokkalis, who was poised to assume the helm of Intracom Holdings, coupled with liquidity challenges and mounting concerns about the trajectory of the business group's companies, prompted him to resume his role in 2019, assuming the position of executive chairman at Intracom Holdings.

Kokkalis's strategy involved a revision of the Intracom Group's activities, including the sale of numerous subsidiaries, such as "INTRAKAT", "INTRASOFT" International, and "INTRAKOM DEFENCE". Additionally, the company underwent a transformation into a listed private equity fund, a move that was driven by the need to adapt to the evolving global economic landscape. He attributes this shift to the ascendance of financial capitalism, which has eclipsed the primacy of the productive process. In this new economic landscape, assets and investments have assumed a dominant role. In light of these developments, Intracom Group has taken the strategic decision to transform Intracom Holdings into an investment company, following the divestment of its subsidiaries Intrasoft and Intrakat and the subsequent acquisition of substantial liquidity.

=== Olympiacos ===
In 1991, he commenced his involvement with Olympiacos, assuming the role of president of the basketball team. Following the success of the Greek national team at the 1987 Eurobasket, there was a notable increase in the popularity of basketball in Greece. In response to this, Kokkalis undertook a series of strategic reorganisations and appointments, including the selection of Giannis Ioannidis and Dušan Ivković as coaches. These decisions contributed to the team's ability to participate successfully in both the Greek and European Championships. For the first time in its history, the team achieved a series of five consecutive Greek championship titles (1993, 94, 95, 96, 97), three cup victories (1994, 97, 2002), and the Champions Cup at the Rome Final Four (1997).

He resigned from his position as president of the basketball team in 2004 due to a divergence of opinions with the then-president of the Hellenic Basketball Federation George Vassilakopoulos. The then mayor of Piraeus, Panagiotis Fasoulas, acted as mediator for Giorgos and Panagiotis Angelopoulos with a view to their assuming positions within the administration. The Angelopoulos brothers assumed responsibility for the team's financial obligations, co-managing with Kokkalis until approximately 2010, when they assumed control of the team on their own.

In 1993, he also assumed control of the football team at a pivotal moment in its history. The team, already bankrupt in fact, was morally and financially discredited as a consequence of the mismanagement of the previous presidents, George Koskotas, who was entangled in the Koskotas scandal, and Argiris Saliarelis. In March 1992, the Court of First Instance of Piraeus appointed a new Board of Directors for Olympiacos, including Stavros Daifas as chairman and Sokratis Kokkalis as member. Daifas was successful in obtaining legislative regulation for the repayment of the club's considerable debts. The regulation was made by "Law 2021/1992" of Stefanos Manos, Minister of National Economy in the government of Konstantinos Mitsotakis, which was passed by all parties of the Parliament, except the KKE. Among other things, the law provided for the cancellation of debts amounting to 3 billion drachmas.

In March 1993, after "Law 2166/93" provided for the repayment of the debt in 120 instalments, Stavros Daifas, who was suffering from health problems, left the presidency and Kokkalis took over.

During the next eight years, the club paid to the Greek State 3,110,206,402 drachmas to repay the debts created by the Olympiacos administrations from 1987 to 1992.

During his tenure, the club achieved a total of 37 Greek Championships and 24 Greek Cups. Additionally, the team's infrastructure was enhanced with the establishment of a new training centre in Rentis and the construction of the new Karaiskakis Stadium, which, at the time, was of a similar standard to the Olympic Stadium.

The financial crisis that Greece experienced from 2009 onwards prompted the Kokkalis family (his son, Petros S. Kokkalis, had been the Vice President of the team at the time) to implement a strategy of cost reduction, while simultaneously seeking the involvement of other businessmen with an interest in Olympiacos in the shareholding. When this objective was not met, he sold his majority stake to Evangelos Marinakis on 18 June 2010.

== Links with Stasi ==
As per historical records, Socrates Kokkalis was first approached by the Stasi in January 1963. He consented to collaborate and share information about his social circle and individuals who could potentially be recruited by the Stasi. In exchange, the agency permitted him to sustain his small-scale illicit trade of consumer goods from West to East Berlin. Reportedly, during this period, he was employed as a technician for East German television.

During his trip to Greece in 1962 for his father's funeral, he spoke with a Stasi agent about the prospect of establishing residency there and fostering commercial ties between Greece and East Germany, following his interactions with some local businesspeople.

The feedback from the discussions was favorable. Subsequently, in 1965, he established permanent residency in Greece with the assistance of Ioannis Papageorgiou, who was then a member of the Centre Union, and expanded his network within the country's political circles. During that year, his role as an informant was terminated, and on 11 December 1968, the file with the codename "Rocco" was officially closed by decision.

The information that has been made public thus far indicates that Kokkalis continued to maintain his connections with the Stasi. Kokkalis is referenced in the decoded HVA digital file, SIRA, from 1998, where he is identified by the code names "Kaskade" and "Krokus".

In particular, the first reference to "Directorate 3" of the HVA's intelligence sector is made in 1982. In 1985, he is purported to have been assigned to the mission of circumventing the technology embargo on East Germany transferring western know-how.

Kokkalis was known as "Crocus" during the final stage, which continued until 1989.

=== Disclosures ===
In 1996, the parliament of the newly reunified Germany established the Independent Commission on Property of Political Parties and Mass Organizations of the GDR with the objective of tracing and confiscating the assets of the former East German SED, even if these assets had been transferred to private individuals. In this context, the financing of INTRACOM (in particular, the source of INTRACOM's initial capital, derived from the SED) is investigated, and the connection between Socrates Kokkalis and the Stasi is revealed for the first time.

The investigation yielded no conclusive evidence. The final conclusion of the Commission, published on 28 May 1998, states: In January 1963, Sokratis Kokkalis was recruited by the Stasi under the code name "Rocco" as a GI (secret informant, then known as IM). However, the evaluated documents of the MfS contain no evidence that Kokkalis was ultimately actively recruited as an IM or committed himself as such. Furthermore, it was not possible to definitively determine whether Integra and Intrakom should be attributed to GDR assets. No evidence could be found to suggest the involvement of the GDR or the SED/PDS in the companies in question.
Simultaneously, Commission member Friedhelm Beucher, a member of the Bundestag for the SPD, publicly accused the Federal Government of Germany of obstructing the investigation of Kokkalis. Beucher offered the following explanation: it would appear that there was a consultation between Prime Ministers Kohl and Mitsotakis at the joint funeral of Willy Brandt in 1992. Kohl, who was seeking extradition from Greece to Germany, had promised Stasi agent Helmut Voigt that he would not investigate INTRACOM.

In 2002, the investigative journalist Aristea Bougatsou, writing for the Greek newspaper Kathimerini, published documents from the archives of the East German Ministry for State Security which appeared to link Sokratis Kokkalis to the service initially as an informer and subsequently as a spy.
These allegations led to the intervention of the First Instance Prosecutor Dimitris Papangelopoulos in February 2002 who brought criminal charges against Sokratis Kokkalis for five felonies and two misdemeanours.^{b} In 2003, at the conclusion of the pre-trial proceedings, the Prosecutor, with the agreement of the Magistrate, closed the case about espionage, on the grounds that the offence for which they were accused had become statute-barred due to the lapse of fifteen years since their commission. For the remaining offences, the judicial investigation ended in 2007 with an order of the Council of Appeal.

== Notes ==
- ^a Following the defeat of the Democratic Army of Greece in the civil war, approximately 100,000 individuals fled to Eastern Bloc countries in order to evade imprisonment and execution. The Greek state revoked their citizenship, thereby precluding their return to Greece in the subsequent years. The government of Georgios Papandreou introduced a more lenient approach, whereby applications for repatriation were no longer considered on an individual basis but rather as part of a broader policy shift. This new approach involved a more systematic screening process to assess the potential risks associated with each applicant and determine whether they posed a threat to the state.
- ^bThe charges against him were:

Espionage against Greece as a Stasi agent until 1989, initially as an informer and then as an associate of the East German Ministry of State Security.
Felony fraud against Intracom shareholders allegedly committed through the concealment and encapsulation of the proceeds of contracts entered into in the context of the development of the Russian Lotto
Embezzlement of several billion drachmas derived from contracts with the Russian and Romanian states.
Possession, trafficking and ultimately money laundering of proceeds of criminal activities falling under the money laundering provisions. :Bribery to the extent of a felony in connection with the law on the embezzlement of the state.
Bribery in the degree of felony committed to public officials, such as executives of OTE.
