= Avax Group =

Greek construction company

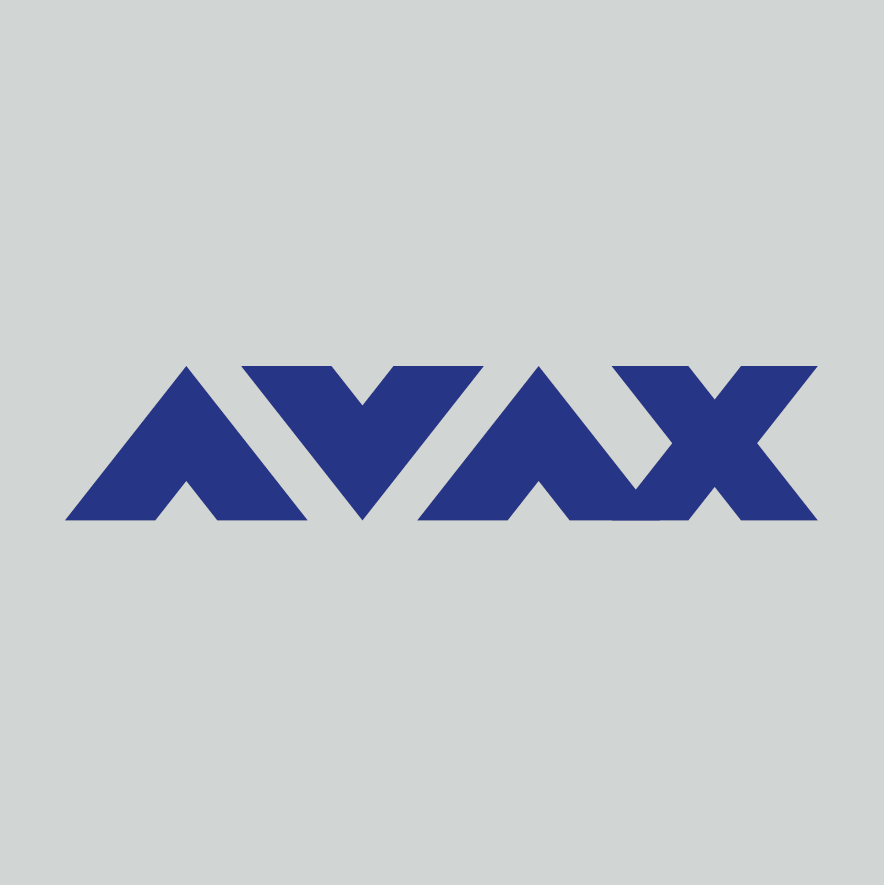
- Native name: Όμιλος Άβαξ
- Formerly: J&P Avax (2002–2019)
- Type: Private
- Industry: Construction, Concessions, Energy
- Founded: 1986
- Headquarters: Athens, Greece
- Area served: Europe, Middle East, Africa
- Key people: Christos Ioannou; Konstantinos Mitzalis
- Website: https://avax.gr/en/

The Avax Group (Greek: Όμιλος Άβαξ), stylised as AVAX and formerly known as J&P Avax, is one of the oldest and largest construction groups in Greece. It is mainly active in the field of constructions, concessions, and real estate development, in Greece and international markets. Avax has been listed on the Athens Stock Exchange, since 1994 and the projects it has undertaken to execute, currently amount to 2.2 billion Euros. Some prominent projects of the group are Attiki Odos, Athens Metro, Rio–Antirrio Bridge and The Mall Athens.

== History ==
=== Founding and J&P era (1986–2018) ===
The Avax Group traces its origins back to 1941, with the establishment of J&P Overseas. In 1986, Avax S.A. was founded, while in 1993, J&P Hellas began operating in Greece. Avax S.A. has been listed on the Athens Stock Exchange, since 1994. In 2002, Avax merged with J&P Hellas to form J&P Avax.

Foundations of Subsidiaries - Acquisitions - Mergers

2000 - Avax acquired ETETH S.A., established in 1961
2002 - J&P Avax founded AUTECO, active in the vehicle technical inspection sector
2007 - J&P Avax entered into a strategic and shareholding partnership with the construction company ATHENA S.A.
2007 - MONDO TRAVEL S.A. was established, operating in the field of organised tourist services
2008 - Task J&P Avax was founded, operating in facilities management
2017 - Completion of E-Construction S.A. and PROET SA absorption, by J&P Avax
2018 - AVAX S.A. announced the completion of the absorption of its 100% subsidiary ATHENA S.A.

In 2017, J&P Avax was fined €18.3 million ($20.67 million) for colluding with other major Greek construction companies for 23 years (1989–2012) to rig the tenders for public work projects in their favour, including projects that received funding from the European Union.

=== Post-J&P era (2018–present) ===
Avax Group's then-parent company J&P Overseas (Joannou & Paraskevaides) collapsed and entered liquidation on 24 October 2018, with a deficit of around $750 million (€635.06 million) and a lot of unpaid wages. Writing for Forbes shortly after its collapse, Antonis Antoniou observed that J&P Overseas suffered from a feud between the Joannou and Paraskevaides families after its founders died, resulting in mismanagement: shortly before collapse, J&P Overseas sold off its stake in Queen Alia International Airport in Amman, which according to the Financial Mirror in 2018 was expected to earn J&P at least $100 million (€84.67 million).

On 27 March 2019, J&P Avax returned to its original name (Avax) to distance itself from its bankrupt parent, while also approving a €20 million ($22.39 million) fundraising effort to increase its liquidity. On 10 December 2019, Avax announced that they bought J&P Energy & Industrial Projects, a former subsidiary of J&P Overseas.

== Shareholders Structure ==
As of 17 May 2024, three people and three companies have a share of more than 5% in the Avax Group, owning a total of 59.6% of all shares:

- Konstantinos Mitzalis (16.0%)
- JCGH Ltd (14.1%)
- Konstantinos Kouvaras (8.6%)
- CSME Holdings Ltd (7.5%)
- Honeysuckle Properties Ltd (7.5%)
- Stelios Christodoulou (5.9%)

== Group Companies ==
- ETETH S.A.: ETETH S.A. was established in 1961 and holds a 6th class certificate for public works. In 2001, it became a subsidiary of the AVAX Group.
- AVAX DEVELOPMENT : AVAX Development S.A. was established in 1991 as a real estate development and investment company with operations in Greece and Central Eastern Europe. As a part of AVAX Group, it specializes in residential projects, including urban properties and holiday homes, while also making strategic investments in the commercial sector.
- IXION S.A.: Ixion is an infrastructure asset management company of the AVAX Group, providing operation, maintenance, and technical management services for concession, PPP, and energy projects.
- ELVIEX: The Hellenic Timber Impregnation Industry (ELVIEX OE) was established in 1970 and specializes in the impregnation of wooden poles. It operates as a subsidiary of the construction company ETETH S.A., which, in turn, is a subsidiary of AVAX Group.
- AUTECO: AUTECO (Vehicle Technical Inspection Centers) was founded in 2006 by AVAX Group and operates vehicle technical inspection facilities with ISO 9001:2015 certification.
- TASK AVAX: TASK AVAX is a subsidiary of AVAX Group and specializes in facility management services, including cleaning, maintenance, and repair services, among others.
- Athens Marina: Athens Marina was established in 2009 with the aim of renovating Faliro Marina to accommodate mega and super yachts (ranging from 50 to 130 meters in length). It is a 100% subsidiary of AVAX Group.

== Notable completed projects ==
J&P(O)Ltd's most notable completed projects include:

- the Seeb International Airport in Muscat, Oman which was completed in 1976. It is the main airport in Oman and the hub for the national carrier Oman Air.
- the King Fahd International Airport in Dammam, Saudi Arabia which was completed in 1993. It is located 15 kilometres (9.3 mi) northwest of Dammam, Saudi Arabia. It is the largest airport in the world in terms of land area (780 km^{2} (300 sq mi)), thus making it larger than the nearby country of Bahrain.
- the Abu Dhabi International Airport in Abu Dhabi, United Arab Emirates. finished in 1981. It is the second largest airport in the U.A.E.
- the Rio-Antirio Bridge in Greece completed in 2004. It is a cable-stayed bridge crossing the Gulf of Corinth near Patras, linking the town of Rio on the Peloponnese to Antirrio on mainland Greece.
- the Al Bustan Palace Hotel in Muscat, Oman.
- the Queen Alia International Airport in Amman, Jordan to be completed in 2011. The EPC (contract) for the Rehabilitation, Expansion and Operation of Queen Alia International Airport is shared between J&P(O) Ltd and J&P AVAX SA. Works will increase the initial capacity of the airport to 9 million passengers annually and give the ability to expand to 12 million passengers annually. Also, the expansion of the airport will allow it to handle the Airbus A380.
- Two contracts for The Pearl-Qatar artificial island, in Doha, Qatar: The Roads and Infrastructure Project for the Island to be completed during 2010, and the Design and Construction of Qanat Quartier Precinct and the Construction of 31 Villas in La Plage and Bahriya Precincts to be completed during 2011.
- Construction of the main works contract for seven maintenance hangars (A to G) along with all required facilities (workshops, power plant, stores, car parks, administration building, mosque and all services) over an area of 565,000 m^{2} (6,080,000 sq ft) at Dubai International Airport.
- Additionally two further contracts were executed, one for the design, construction, supply, installation and commissioning of civil and landscaping works (both airside and landside) and the second for all works associated with the construction and commissioning of an additional hangar 'Hangar H'. Client: Emirates Airlines Consultant: ADPI Contract Value: USD 457 million Status: Completed 2010
- Construction of a passenger terminal complex with a 6.5 million passenger per year and comprising terminal building (covered area 71,000 m^{2} (760,000 sq ft)), taxiways and interconnections (3,200 m × 23 m (10,499 ft × 75 ft)), aprons (150,000 m^{2} (1,600,000 sq ft)), car park and road works, including all electromechanical installations and external works and services. Client: Civil Aviation Authority Consultant: NESPAK Contract Value: USD 200 million Joint Venture: J&P (O) Ltd 65% - Airsys ATM 35% Status: Completed 2002 Demolition of existing interchange (2 bridges) and reconstruction of the new interchange (7 bridges) at Al Safa area on Sheikh Zayed road. The interchanges consists of two loops, two directional links in addition to four right turn ramps, re-configuration of internal roads and parking areas within the interchange limits. Also construction of road signage, landscaping, street lighting and all associated services. Client: Dubai Municipality Consultant: De Leuw Cather Contract Value: USD 15 million Status: Completed 2002

2001-2006 Rehabilitation road Woldiya -Addis Abeba (400 km) Ethiopia

=== Motorway concessions in Greece ===
As of January 2026, Avax has a stake in the following motorway concessions:

- 23.61% of Aegean Motorway, operator of part of the A1 motorway between Raches and Kleidi;
- 23.01% of Olympia Odos, operator of the A5 motorway south of Rio, and the A8 motorway;
- 15% of Moreas, operator of the A7 and A71 motorways;

Avax used to own 34.21% of Attiki Odos S.A., the operator of the Attiki Odos motorway network until 6 October 2024, when the GEK Terna-led Nea Attiki Odos took over the concession: 10.02% of Avax's stake was held by their subsidiary ETETH.

== Global International Contractor Rank ==
In 2009 the journal Engineering News-Record ranked J&P(O) Ltd as the 36th Largest International Contractor globally.
