= Metlen Energy & Metals =

Industrial conglomerate located in Athens, Greece

- Type: Anonymi etaireia
- Traded as: LSE: MTLN; Athex: MTLN; FTSE/Athex Large Cap component
- Industry: Metals, energy
- Founded: 1990; 36 years ago
- Headquarters: Maroussi, Greece
- Key people: Evangelos Mytilineos (Chairman); Christos Gavalas (CEO)
- Products: Aluminium mining and smelting, electricity generation, renewable energy, infrastructure and defense industry engineering, defense vehicle production
- Revenue: ▲€7,107.0 million (2025)
- Operating income: ▼€562.7 million (2025)
- Net income: ▼€324.9 million (2025)
- Owner: Evangelos Mytilineos (21.53%); Fairfax Financial (6.43%) (as at 30 May 2024)
- Website: www.metlen.com

Metlen Energy & Metals (formerly known as Mytilineos Energy & Metals) is a global industrial and energy company operating two business Sectors: Energy and Metallurgy. It is listed on the London Stock Exchange and is a constituent of the FTSE 100 Index.

== History ==
The company was founded by Evangelos Mytilineos, who amalgamated his family's metallurgy businesses, as Mytilineos Holdings in Greece in 1990.

It acquired a series of copper, zinc and lead mines in Europe in early 1990s and was listed on the Athens Stock Exchange in 1995.

The company then acquired a large construction business, Metka, in 1998, and it expanded into the energy sector in the early 2000s.

In June 2024, the company rebranded and updated its corporate identity to Metlen Energy & Metals. It then transferred its primary listing from the Athens Stock Exchange to London in August 2025.

== Operations ==
Energy

In May 2015, Metlen announced new engineering, procurement and construction contracts for renewable energy projects in UK. At that time, the company had a portfolio comprising 85 renewable energy projects, comprising 58 solar energy projects and 27 battery energy storage system projects.

Metals

In January 2025, Metlen announced a €295.5 million investment to enhance its production capabilities in bauxite, alumina, and gallium. This project aims to increase annual production to approximately 2 million tonnes of bauxite and 1,265,000 tonnes of alumina, up from the previous 865,000 tonnes. The initiative will introduce an annual production of 50 metric tonnes of gallium, marking the first time this critical material is produced industrially in Europe.

To secure its raw material supply chain, Metlen has signed two long-term agreements with Rio Tinto. The first agreement will see Rio Tinto supplying approximately 14.9 million tonnes (mt) of bauxite from the CBG mine in Guinea to Metlen over an 11-year period, from 2027 to 2037, while the second pertains to alumina offtake, under which Metlen will supply Rio Tinto with 3.9mt of alumina, sourced from its expanded Agios Nikolaos refinery, over an eight-year period, starting in 2027.
