= Aristea Bougatsou =

Greek journalist (1964–2013)

Aristea Bougatsou (Greek: Αριστέα Μπουγάτσου; Athens, 1964 – 9 February 2013) was a Greek investigative journalist.

== Biography ==
Aristea Bougatsou was born in Athens in 1964, but grew up in Gargalianoi, Messenia. She studied in ASOEE, and went on to work in Kathimerini, Skai 100.3 and Eleftherotypia. She was known for her courage, straightness and integrity.

Bougatsou was involved in shedding light on cases such as the Siemens Greek bribery scandal, the fraudulent competition which led to the purchase of the Leopard 2 tanks, the Proton Bank scandal and the OTE commissions.

She died on 9 February 2013 from cancer.
