= Petros S. Kokkalis =

Greek businessman and politician

Petros S. Kokkalis MEP
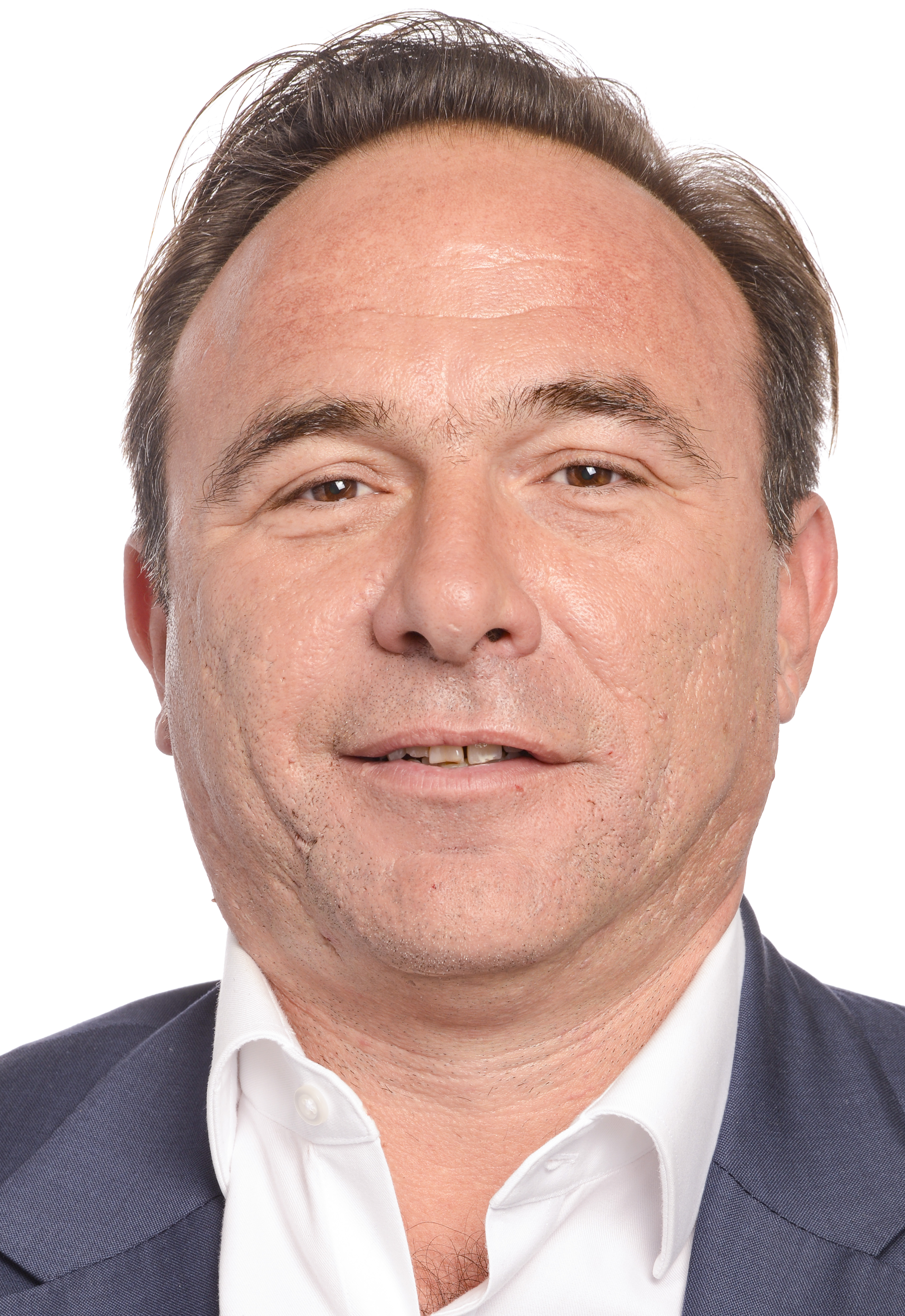

Member of the European Parliament for Greece
- In office 2 July 2019 – 16 July 2024

Personal details
- Born: 26 February 1970 (age 56) Athens, Greece
- Party: Kosmos (2023–present)
- Other political affiliations: Syriza (until 2023)
- Occupation: Businessman

Petros S. Kokkalis (Greek: Πέτρος Σ. Κόκκαλης; born 26 February 1970) is a Greek businessman and former member of the European Parliament.

== Biography ==
Petros Kokkalis holds a B.A. from Hampshire College with a concentration in history; his Division III title was "Making the Love of My People: Constructing Legitimacy for the Monarchy in Late 19th Century Greece.” He earned his M.P.A. at the John F. Kennedy School of Government at Harvard University, where he serves as a member of the Dean's Alumni Leadership Council. He was the Vice-President and shareholder of Intracom Holdings, one of the largest multinational technology groups in South-Eastern Europe, and the Vice-President and shareholder of Intralot S.A., a gaming technology supplier and lottery licensed operator. He was also the Vice-President of the Greek football club Olympiacos and is the Vice-President of the Kokkalis Foundation, a non-profit organization that promotes education and training, culture and social welfare, medical research and information technology, and athletics, both in Greece and abroad. He is Secretary General of Organization Earth, an environmental education NGO. He was elected a Member of the European Parliament for Syriza at the 2019 election but left the party in November 2023.
