= Motor Oil Hellas =

Greek petroleum industry company

Motor Oil (Hellas) Corinth Refineries S.A.
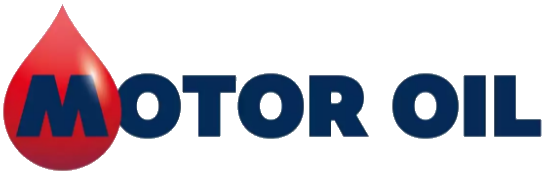
- Native name: ΜΟΤΟΡ ΟΪΛ ΕΛΛΑΣ Α.Ε.
- Type: Anonymi Etairia
- Traded as: Athex: MOH
- Industry: Petroleum, Gas & energy industry
- Founded: 1970; 56 years ago
- Founder: Nikos Vardinogiannis; Vardis Vardinogiannis
- Headquarters: Marousi, Athens, Greece
- Area served: Southeast Europe, North Africa
- Key people: Yannis Vardinoyannis (Chairman and CEO)
- Products: Petroleum refining and transportation in Greece and abroad, energy, other petrochemicals
- Services: Fuel gas stations, oil tankers, airplanes
- Revenue: ▼€11.48 billion (2025)
- Operating income: ▼€1.04 billion (2025)
- Net income: ▲€650 million (2025)
- Total assets: ▲€8.03 billion (2025)
- Total equity: ▲€3.35 billion (2025)
- Owner: Petroventure Holdings Limited (40.97%)
- Number of employees: 4,310 (2025)
- Subsidiaries: Avin Oil/Cyclon; Coral Gas/Shell Hellas; Ermes; Korinthos Power; Mediamax Holdings Limited
- Website: moh.gr

Motor Oil (Hellas) Corinth Refineries S.A. (Greek: Μότορ Όιλ (Ελλάς) Διυλιστήρια Κορίνθου Α.Ε.) is a petroleum industry company based in Greece focusing on oil refining and trading. It is a leading force in its sector in Southern Europe and the Mediterranean.

== History ==
Motor Oil Hellas was founded on May 7, 1970, by Vardis Vardinogiannis and Georgios Paraschos Aleksandridis. It is headquartered in Marousi, Greece. Vardis J. Vardinoyannis served as chairman and managing director from 1972 until his death in November 2024, his son Yannis Vardinoyannis was appointed as his successor. As of December 2025, the company had 4,310 employees. Despite the Greek crisis in 2015, the company had thrived.

In 2020 Motor Oil Hellas gave TechnipFMC a significant engineering, procurement, and construction management services contract. The new naphtha complex in Greece will have three new processing units and a capacity of 22,000 barrels per day (3,500 m^{3}/d). The Construction of the complex was completed in 2022, beginning operations later in the year after getting the formal "Green Light" from the Greek Ministry of the Environment and Energy.

== Operations ==
=== Refinery, facilities and gas stations ===
Through its Korinthos refinery, Motor Oil controls 35% of the refining sector in Greece. The company operates the second-largest refiner (Corinth Refinery) in Europe and the Cairo-based oil and gas exploration and production facilities in Egypt. It also owns the Avin, Shell and Cyclon chain of fuel stations in Greece, more than 2,000, along with a host of other gas and energy-related businesses.

In 2025, Motor Oil Hellas inaugurated Greece’s first hydrogen refuelling station in Agioi Theodoroi, operated by its subsidiary Avin Oil. The station is the first in Europe to be co-financed (50%) by the EU’s Connecting Europe Facility (CEF) – Transport programme, as part of a €3 million investment. The facility currently sources green hydrogen from Austria, with plans to use hydrogen from a nearby 50MW production plant under development by Motor Oil.

Construction of a 30MW electrolyser has begun at the Korinthos refinery, with an additional 20MW ordered from Sweden-based Metacon in early 2025. The overall project aims to produce up to 60,000 tonnes of hydrogen and 25,000 tonnes of e-methanol annually by 2029. The European Commission approved a €111.7 million subsidy in February 2025 to support the hydrogen development project.

=== Renewable energy ===
In January 2025, Motor Oil Hellas bought a 50% stake in Aioliki Provata Traianoupolis from TERNA Energy, giving the two companies equal shares in a proposed 400 MW offshore-wind project near Alexandroupolis. In April 2026, three battery-storage projects from MORE, a subsidiary of Motor Oil Hellas, were connected to the grid. Their total capacity are 72 MW and 144 MWh. In July 2026, MORE began trial operation of its Stâlpu 1 and 2 projects in Romania, consisting of 111 MW of total photovoltaic capacity and two battery system.

== Subsidiaries and affiliates ==
Motor Oil Hellas has numerous subsidiaries, such as:

- Avin Oil Industrial, Commercial and Maritime Company S.M.S.A.,
- Coral Oil and Chemicals Company S.A.,
- Coral Commercial and Industrial Gas Company S.A.,
- LPC S.M.S.A. Corporation for Processing and Trading of Lubricants and Petroleum Products,
- NRG Supply and Trading S.M.S.A.,
- OFC Aviation Fuel Services S.A.,
- Korinthos Power S.A.,
- Shell & MOH Aviation Fuels S.A.,
- Athens Airport Fuel Pipeline Company.
- Hellenic Hydrogen S.A.

In January 2025, the company acquired a 94.44% stake in waste-management company Helector from Ellaktor through its subsidiary Manetial Limited. In May 2026, MOH subsidiary Ireon Investments bought 60% of the shares in waste-management company ENACT.

== Ownership ==
Motor Oil's majority shareholder is two holding companies (Petroventure and Motor Oil Limited with 40.97%), that belongs to the prominent Greek family of Vardinogiannis, the rest of its shares are available to the public through a float on the Athens and the London Stock Exchange.

== See also ==
- Energy in Greece
