= Evangelos Mytilineos =

Greek businessman

Evangelos Mytilineos Ευάγγελος Μυτιληναίος
- Born: March 22, 1954 (age 71); Athens, Greece
- Occupation: Steel & Energy
- Board member of: Mytilineos Holdings (Chairman & CEO)
- Children: Giorgos Mytilineos; Eriketi Mytilineou

Evangelos Mytilineos (Greek: Ευάγγελος Μυτιληναίος, born in Athens in 1954) is a Greek businessman, chairman of Metlen Energy & Metals. He was ranked on the Forbes list for 2024 at number 2059 with an estimated fortune $1.8 billions.

Born in Athens in 1954, Evangelos Mytilineos graduated from the Moraitis School, holds a BSc in Economics from the University of Athens and an MSc in Economics from the London School of Economics. In 2019 he was awarded an honorary doctorate from the Department of Business Administration and Management at the University of Piraeus.

During 2018, Mytilineos was announced as the winner and awarded the 2018 Hellenic Capital Link Leadership Award due to his work and contributions to the Greek economy. The award was part of Capital Link's 20th investment forum presented in New York.

Mytilineos family hails from Koroni.

As of 2024, his stake at Metlen Energy & Metals is estimated to be worth around 1 billion euros or 850 million pounds. In 2025 Metlen announced its plans to move its primary listing from Athens to London.
