= EYDAP =

Greek water supply company

Athens Water Supply and Sewerage Company
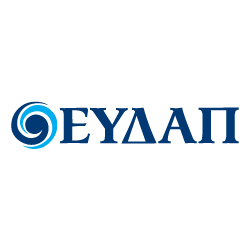
- Trade name: EYDAP
- Native name: Εταιρεία Ύδρευσης και Αποχέτευσης Πρωτεύουσας
- Romanized name: Eteria Ydrefsis ke Apohetefsis Protevusas
- Type: State owned
- Traded as: Athex: EYDAP
- Industry: Water industry
- Founded: 1980
- Headquarters: Galatsi, Athens, Greece
- Area served: Metropolitan area of Athens
- Key people: Theodora Varvarigou (Chairman); Harry Sachinis (CEO)
- Services: Water Supply & Sewerage
- Revenue: €330.32 million (2020)
- Operating income: €(92.18) million (2020)
- Net income: €(66.10) million (2020)
- Total assets: €1.613 billion (2020)
- Total equity: €827.81 million (2020)
- Owner: Greek state (61.33%); Paulson & Co. (9.99%)
- Number of employees: 2637 (2020)
- Website: www.eydap.gr/en

The Athens Water Supply and Sewerage Company (Greek: Εταιρεία Ύδρευσης και Αποχέτευσης Πρωτεύουσας, Eteria Ydrefsis ke Apohetefsis Protevusas, abbr. ΕΥΔΑΠ, EYDAP) is the largest Greek enterprise in its sector. Based in Galatsi in Athens, it is serving 4.3 million customers in the metropolitan area of Athens with fresh water and 3.5 million customers with sewers.

== Company ==
EYDAP was founded in 1980 after the merge of the two water suppliers Hellenic Water Company (Greek: Ελληνική Εταιρεία Υδάτων; EEY) and Greater Athens Sewerage Organization (OAP).

The Greek state holds a majority stake in EYDAP, with further 27 percent being listed at the Athens Exchange where it belongs to the 25 companies forming the FTSE/Athex Large Cap index.

Following the Greek government-debt crisis, EYDAP was planned to be fully privatized under the terms of the Eurozone Memorandum. In May 2014, the Greek Council of State however blocked the transfer of the government's stake to its privatization fund, the Hellenic Republic Asset Development Fund. The constitutional court ruled that the sale would be unconstitutional. Following this decision, a merger of EYDAP with the Thessaloniki Water Supply & Sewage Co. (EYATH) was taken into consideration instead.
