= Ellaktor =

Greek construction group

Ellaktor S.A. Eλλακτωρ A.E.
- Type: Anonymi Etairia
- Traded as: Athex: ELLAKTOR
- Industry: Construction, energy, mining
- Founded: 1977; 49 years ago
- Headquarters: Nea Kifissia, Greece
- Key people: Georgios Mylonogiannis (Chairman); Efthimios Bouloutas (CEO)
- Services: Infrastructure construction; road construction and operation concessions; waste management; electricity generation; renewable energy; real estate investment
- Revenue: €1.040 billion (2022)
- Net income: €518.6 miilion (2022)
- Owner: Reggeborgh Invest B.V (46.16%); Motor Oil Hellas (29.87%)
- Number of employees: 7,500 (2022)
- Website: en.ellaktor.gr

Ellaktor SA is a multinational Greek construction group (largest in Greece) with operations spanning various sectors of public and private development (real estate, energy (biogas and others), railway (Athens-Piraeus Electric Railways upgrade), fuel pipes, other infrastructure development) in ten countries. Internationally it operates in Oman (Blue City project through subsidiary Aktor, it is the largest key project abroad (€629 million giving it 50% interest), Serbia, Bucharest & Russia (waste management, in Russia it is currently the preferred bidder for a concession), Qatar (airport, 40%) as well as UAE, and Kuwait. It is also a holding company that owns interest in European Goldfields (19.36%, primarily to give it access to Hellas Gold (which it also has a 5% direct stake in) and the Hellenic Casino of Pamitha/Athens Mont Parnes Casino (15.3%) which is undergoing expansion (January 2011).

There are also significant real estate assets managed by subsidiary REDS. They include the Athens Exhibition Centre (11.7%), Kantza Mall (100%, budget at €300 million is the highest) and the Yialou Retail Park (100%) and the Piraeus Metropolitan Center (19.5%).

The company's consistent annual growth in revenue from 2005 to 2009 ended in 2010 when for the first time in half a decade Ellaktor recorded negative growth in sales (down 21.8% to €1.3 billion for the first nine months of the 2010 fiscal year). The drop in net profit (after minority interests) was even more pronounced (fell to €9 million from €72 million, net profit fell every year since 2007 when it amounted to €130 million). In 2010 net debt (€913 million) grew six times faster than total assets (23% compared to over 3%). On February 2, 2014 Ellaktor had a market value of €6.8 billion

== Operations ==
Operations are conducted through eight direct subsidiaries, each involved in one of the group's six main areas of business. 34% of the company's project backlog is outside of Greece (total project backlog is €2.6 billion about half of its historic high in 2007 (€5 billion); about 37% comes from concessions, 21% from Infrastructure projects. Many of its development contracts come from concessions which the company competes for domestically and internationally (competitors are both domestic and foreign. Attiki Odos and Rio Antirrio (bridge) are two of the biggest concession projects the company has been involved in. In 2011 it won its third Doha airport related contract (€68 million deal). For 2010 solar power projects could contribute as much as €60 million in revenue.

Concessions projects - motorways, bridges, parking lots, other (buildings). Subsidiaries are Aktor Concessions (100% owned); Aktor is involved in the Athens toll ring road and a major toll bridge in Greece.

Construction - Aktor (100% owned) and Hellenic Quarries (100% indirect ownership)

Environmental facilities - Ellaktor both builds and operates a variety of facilities most related to the generation of renewable energy. Involved in waste management, recycling, solar energy and wind power.

- Waste Management - Hellector (80% owned), most business is in Greece and Cyprus. This business sector involves the construction of landfills (some biogas fired), recycling plants (public) as well as the management of leachate treatment plants. Hellector is the only producer of biogas in Greece and operates internationally in Germany (Herhof & Helector) and Bulgaria.
- Energy - renewable including biogas and alternative energy (wind, solar). Includes thermal electricity production (Elpedison Power, Elpedison is a joint venture between Ellaktor (24%), Italian energy company Edison (38%) and Hellenic Petroleum (38%). Subsidiaries include Ellinki Technomiki Anemos (67%), Elpedison Power (22.74%) and Biosar (wholly owned).

Real Estate - R.E.D.S (55.4%)

Renewable Energy - The group established itself in the alternative energy market in 2000 when it created Eltech Anemos. In 2014 Anemos had a successful completion of IPO. It is involved in photovoltaic and wind production (289 MW of capacity with another 202 MW being constructed as of Q3 2018).

In November 2023, Ellaktor sold Aktor to Intrakat for a total of €224.8 million ($243.07 million): Intrakat then renamed itself to the Aktor Group, in October 2024. In September 2025, Ellaktor sold Aktor Concessions to the Aktor Group for €194.6 million ($210.41 million).

=== Former operations ===
Aktor Concessions, while it was part of Ellaktor, used to own 65.75% of Attiki Odos S.A., the operator of the Attiki Odos motorway network until 6 October 2024, when the GEK Terna-led Nea Attiki Odos took over the concession.

== Greek projects ==
Ellaktor's Greek projects are for the most part majority controlled (over 70% interest in most of the key ones though the largest, a transportation toll road connecting Patra and Tsakona (€522 million in backlog) involves participation of only 17% through Aktor). Backlog comes mostly from transportation related developments followed by infrastructure projects (8, both public and private).

== Shareholders ==
In July 2018, the General Assembly of the shareholders voted for changing ELLAKTOR Group's management, in what was the first proxy fight ever held in Greece. Following the change and as per the Shareholder Register of 16.8.2019, Ellaktor's over 5% are PEMANOARO LIMITED (25.58%) and Leonidas Bobolas (12.55%) and the Free Float <5% (61.87%). PEMANOARO LIMITED is a company which is jointly controlled by Anastassios P. Kallitsantsis and Dimitrios P. Kallitsantsis. Also Anastassios Kallitsantsis owns a)as natural person 190,500 shares and equal voting rights, ie 0.09%, and b)through ARGONIO ENTERPRISES LIMITED, company controlled by him, 1,336,989 shares and equal voting rights, ie 0.62%. Leonidas Bobolas’ participation (and voting rights) includes the participation of 1.14% held by the company ORANOM HOLDINGS LTD which he controls (i.e. 2,450,000 shares and equal voting rights).

== Controversies ==
In 2017, Ellaktor's former construction subsidiary Aktor was fined €38.5 million ($43.49 million) for colluding with other major Greek construction companies for 23 years (1989–2012) to rig the tenders for public work projects in their favour, including projects that received funding from the European Union: at the time, the fine was the largest in Greece for cartel practices.
