= Terna Energy =

Terna Energy S.A.
- Native name: ΤΕΡΝΑ Ενεργειακή
- Type: Public
- Traded as: Athex: TENERGY
- Industry: Energy, Construction
- Founded: 1997; 29 years ago
- Headquarters: Athens, Greece
- Area served: Greece
- Key people: Giorgos Peristeris (Chairman); Emmanuel Maragoudakis (CEO)
- Products: Energy; Construction; Concessions Waste management Mining; Real Estate
- Revenue: €328.09 million (2020)
- Operating income: €124.53 million (2020)
- Net income: €73.38 million (2020)
- Total assets: €1.974 billion (2020)
- Total equity: €495.66 million (2020)
- Parent: Masdar
- Website: www.terna-energy.com

Terna Energy (Greek: ΤΕΡΝΑ Ενεργειακή) is a Greek renewable energy company that is listed on the Athens Exchange.

Until 2024, it was a subsidiary of Greek conglomerate GEK Terna, which through its subsidiary Heron S.A. is as well involved in the construction and operation of thermoelectric power generation fuelled with natural gas. However, the company produces energy exclusively from renewable energy sources, including wind farms and small hydroelectric plants.

It also constructs renewable energy plants and integrated process units for the overall management and energy utilization of wastes and biomass.

== History ==
The company was incorporated in 1997 as a subsidiary of Terna, which in 1999 merged with GEK to form Greece's largest conglomerate. The Athens-based company has been listed at the Athens Exchange since 2009 and belongs to the 25 companies forming the FTSE/Athex Large Cap index. In 2013, U.S. investment firm York Capital Magagement bought a 10% share of parent company GEK Terna and another 3% share of Terna Energy.

In November 2024, it was announced that Masdar had completed the purchase of a 70% stake in Terna Energy for $3.3 billion.

== See also ==
- Energy in Greece
