= Bally's Intralot =

Greek gambling services company

Bally's Intralot S.A. – Integrated Lottery Systems & Services Bally's Intralot A.E. – Ολοκληρωμένα Πληροφοριακά Συστήματα & Υπηρεσίες Τυχερών Παιχνιδιών
- Type: Anonymi Etairia
- Traded as: Athex: INLOT
- Industry: Lottery and Sports Betting industry
- Founded: 1992
- Headquarters: Athens, Greece
- Key people: Nikolaos Nikolakopoulos (Group CEO); Richard Bateson, US CEO
- Revenue: €364 million (2023)
- Operating income: €348.6 million (2023)
- Net income: €33.6 million (2023)
- Total assets: €588.7 million (2023)
- Total equity: €333.2 million (2023)
- Owner: Bally's Corporation (~58%); CQ Lottery LLC (~11%); Sokratis Kokkalis (~11%); Public Float / Others (~20%)
- Number of employees: 1700 (2023)
- Subsidiaries: Maltco; Intralot Inc. (USA); CyberArts; Bit8; Betting Company
- Website: Intralot.com

Bally's Intralot (Athens Stock Exchange: INLOT) is a Greek gambling company that supplies integrated gambling, transaction processing systems, game content, sports betting management and interactive gambling services, to state-licensed gambling organizations worldwide. The company acts both as a lottery vendor and a lottery operator. It has a presence in 39 countries and a workforce of approximately 1,700 people as of 2022. It is a publicly listed company in the Athens Stock Exchange. The company has drawn controversy and law suits during the past two decades; in 2025, Intralot was fined $6.5 million for fraudulently obtaining and operating a five-year D.C. Lottery contract.

== History ==
Intralot originated as a spin-off of the Intracom group, owned by the Greek billionaire Sokratis Kokkalis. It originally provided infrastructure for the Greek National Lottery (OPAP), under a 1999 contract, but has since expanded its operations into a worldwide market. Intralot's games library includes a variety of games such as numerical games, TV lottery games, sports lotteries, fixed odds betting, instant lotteries, pari-mutuel, video lottery and monitor games.

In December 2009, Intralot announced purchasing 35% of the American online games provider CyberArts, purposing to expand its subsidiary company, Intralot Interactive (I2). In October 2011, Intralot concluded the sale of its minority stake in CyberArts, as per the Group's decision not to exercise the option to increase its participation to 51% and focus on its own technology and services.

During ICE Totally Gaming 2015 the company announced that it will acquire a stake of 25% of Bit8. In December 2017, Intralot completed its acquisition of Bit8, enabling its digital transformation strategy for lottery modernisation.

== Controversies ==
=== Romanian lottery ===
In May 2008, Intralot was implicated in the criminal investigation of Romanian Politician Christian Boureanu for "abuse of office against the public interest" by the National Anticorruption Directorate for Boureanu's role in signing a contract in 2000 between Loteria Română and Intracom SA Hellenic Telecommunication Electronics Industry (Intralot Integrated Lottery Systems and Services) that caused Loteria Română to incur losses of over €120 million.

In January 2014, the Romanian competition council (Consiliul Concurenței) found that state-owned Loteria Română had contracted with Intralot, Intracom, and Lotrom, greatly limiting competition on Romania's video lottery equipment market during the preceding decade. Loteria Română and the companies were fined a total of €3.7 million for contravening competition rules.

In early 2015, it was further revealed that Loteria Română had entered into a secret contract with Lotrom in 2003 to purchase over six thousand slot machines. Intracom and Intralot financed the arrangement, acquiring the lottery's slot machines revenues in exchange. All three companies were found to be under the control of Greek businessman Sokratis Kokkalis, according to RISE Project. Since Loteria Română authorized the machines for video-lottery services, a different taxation was applied, resulting in the €100 million damage to the state. Prosecutors launched a fraud investigation and blocked the lottery's accounts.

=== Washington, D.C. lottery ===
In February 2019, the D.C. Council had authorized a sole-source contract for sports betting throughout Washington, D.C. with Intralot, operator of the D.C. Lottery, to include online sports betting. D.C. Council member Jack Evans was widely criticized for advocating for the legislation, which passed in mid-July, that would awarded the $215 million five-year monopoly on mobile-based sports wagers to the lottery operator, without disclosing his business or long-term personal relationship with Intralot lobbyist William "Bill" Jarvis.

Temporarily blocked in September 2019, when an injunction was issued against the sole-source Intralot contract; the injunction was denied by the judge the following month, and the contract was allowed to move forward. A related lawsuit under the Home Rule Act filed against the District over the awarding of the contract without competition remained pending.

The maligned 2019 D.C. contract had granted Intralot the right to development of the city's official sports-betting App, which it launched in 2020. In 2022, Intralot's App failed during the Super Bowl, resulting in $500,000 in compensation paid to D.C. Lottery by Intralot.

On January 14, 2025, Attorney General Brian Schwalb announced that Intralot, and its subcontractor, Veterans Services Corporation (VSC), would pay restitution totaling $6.5 million for its fraudulent operation of a type of shell game meant to deceive city officials, in order to: win the District's lottery and sports betting contract; obtain related payments; and appear compliant with District law requiring any firm securing a large public contract to subcontract to small local businesses in order to grow the local economy. VSC was revealed to have no employees. Intralot and VSC were found to have conspired in an "elaborate scheme" to secure the contract, with VSC receiving over half of D.C.'s lottery and sports gambling contract proceeds, and then funneling funds back to Intralot, which will pay $5 million of the $6.5 million settlement.

=== Montana state lottery ===
Allegations of a "sweetheart deal" between Montana State Lottery and its long-time vendor Intralot emerged in 2024. During March and September 2024, the Montana State Lottery Commission instructed Lottery Director Bob Brown and staff to send out requests for new proposals (RFPs) for the $50 million contract. In 2025, the Commission came under fire for sidestepping a competitive and transparent bidding process; on February 5, Brown appeared before the Joint Appropriations Subcommittee on General Government at the Montana Legislature and was grilled over persistent delays and the Montana Lottery's avoidance of the bidding process. One month later, amid on-going investigations, Montana Lottery cancelled its negotiations with Intralot to pursue competitive bidding.

== Operations ==
The National Lottery of Malta, privatised in 2004, twice awarded sequential concessions, each spanning a decade, to Maltco, in which Intralot holds the majority stake. Expired 4 July 2022, the concession was then awarded to Izi Group subsidiary National Lottery plc.

In December 2016, as its 2007 contract was ending; Intralot signed its second 10-year contract with Idaho Lottery in the US, that will come into force in October 2017 and last until October 2027, extendable by up to five or ten years.

In February 2018, Intralot announced that they had agreed a 10-year deal worth an estimated $340 million with the Illinois State Lottery. The deal will cover the installation of operational technology in over 7,500 retail locations across the US state.

On March 1, 2019, Intralot's joint venture with Inteltek lost its 15-year contract to control Turkey's Iddaa national sports betting monopoly to Sans Girisim, a joint venture between Scientific Games and Turkish conglomerate Demirören Group.

In 2019, Intralot began to work with the British Columbia Lottery Corporation (BCLC); in 2024, the corporation migrated to Intralot's cloud-based LotosX Omni platform for its retail lottery business, and its Orion platform for sports betting.

== Membership and recognition ==
Intralot is a member of international gambling associations, including the World Lottery Association (WLA), European Lotteries (EL), the North American Association of State & Provincial Lotteries (NASPL) and CIBELAE (the Hispanic association that covers S. America and the Iberian peninsula), as well as the Gaming Standards Association (GSA) in the US and the Asia Pacific Lottery Association (APLA).

Intralot received a "Global IT Excellence Award 2008" by the World Information Technology and Services Alliance (WITSA) during its 16th World Congress on Information Technology (WCIT 2008), Kuala Lumpur, Malaysia.

Betting Company, a subsidiary of Intralot that operated sports betting in 12 countries, signed a cooperation agreement with FIFA's Early Warning System for the protection of the integrity of football.
