= Intracom Holdings =

Greek multinational conglomerate

- Traded as: ATHEX INTRK
- Industry: Conglomerate
- Founded: 1977
- Founder: Socrates Kokkalis & Constantinos Dimitriadis
- Headquarters: Athens, Greece
- Area served: Europe; Middle East & Africa; United States; South East Asia
- Key people: Socrates Kokkalis (Chairman & CEO)
- Products: Telecommunications, electronics, construction, IT
- Revenue: €275.21 million (2021)
- Net income: €135.18 million (2021)
- Total assets: €773.88 million (2021)
- Total equity: €369.9 million (2021)
- Owner: Socrates Kokkalis (25.29%); Constantinos Dimitriadis (8.73%)
- Subsidiaries: Intrakat (5.09%); Intrasoft
- Website: www.intracom.com

Intracom Holdings is the main shareholder of a group of multinational companies specialized in IT services, construction projects and defense electronics systems.

== Overview ==
The core companies of the Intracom Holdings Group are:

- Intrakat, one of the top five construction companies in Greece with 2457 employees.
- IDE (Intracom Defense Electronics), a supplier of defense electronics, advanced communication systems and defense applications software, currently expanding into the design and manufacturing of hybrid energy systems.

Listed on the Athens Stock Exchange since 1990, Intracom maintained a strong presence in the Greek and international markets, with 16 subsidiaries abroad while its international activity extends to 70 countries.
