= GEK Terna =

Greek conglomerate

GEK Terna Holdings Real Estate Constructions S.A.
- Native name: ΓΕΚ ΤΕΡΝΑ
- Type: Anonymi Etairia
- Traded as: Athex: GEKTERNA
- Industry: Construction, Energy
- Founded: 1969 (as GEK)
- Headquarters: Athens, Greece
- Area served: Greece
- Key people: Giorgos Peristeris (Chairman)
- Products: Construction; Concessions; Energy; Waste management Mining; Real Estate
- Revenue: €971.30 million (2020)
- Operating income: €145.10 million (2020)
- Net income: €58.07 million (2020)
- Total assets: €4.635 billion (2020)
- Total equity: €823.86 million (2020)
- Owners: Georgios Peristeris (29.75%); Latsco Hellenic Holdings S.a.r.L (7.60%)
- Number of employees: 2,052 (2020)
- Subsidiaries: Terna Energy S.A. (45.9%); Heron S.A. (50%)
- Website: www.gekterna.com

GEK Terna Holding Real Estate Construction (Genikós etaireía Kataskevastikí)(Greek: ΓΕΚ(Γενικός εταιρεία Κατασκευαστική) ΤΕΡΝΑ) is a large Greek conglomerate which is listed on the Athens Exchange. Its construction branch Terna is one of the leading enterprises of its sector in Greece.

GEK Terna's electric utilities branch Terna Energy lately focused on the production and transmission of renewable energy. Through its subsidiary Heron S.A., it is also involved in the construction and operation of thermoelectric power generation fueled with natural gas as well as the supply of Electricity and Natural Gas to consumers. Terna Energy is listed separately on the Athens Exchange (Athex: TENERGY ).

== Company ==
The company was formed when former competitors GEK and TERNA merged in 1999. Until 2008, GEK was the name of the holding with TERNA being its operational branch. The Athens-based company has been listed at the Athens Exchange since 1969 and belongs to the 25 companies forming the FTSE/Athex Large Cap index. In 2013, U.S. investment firm York Capital Magagement bought a 10% share of the company.

In 2017, GEK Terna was fined €18.6 million ($21.01 million) for colluding with other major Greek construction companies for 23 years (1989–2012) to rig the tenders for public work projects in their favour, including projects that received funding from the European Union.

== Sectors ==
=== Rail privatization bid ===
Following the Greek government-debt crisis, GEK Terna showed interest in the planned privatization of Greek state-owned railway carrier TrainOSE. Together with the state-owned railway companies of Russia and France, RZD and SNCF, and Romanian private railway carrier Grup Feroviar Român, it placed a joint bid for TrainOSE and the Hellenic Company for Rolling Stock Maintenance (Rosco), currently held by the Hellenic Republic Asset Development Fund. Following the January 2015 legislative election, the new SYRIZA-led administration however put the decision under review.

=== Kavala Port ===
In January 2025, GEK Terna's subsidiary, Sarisa, took over the sub-concession for the Kavala Port's commercial use. The agreement, valued at around €34 million, grants Sarisa the rights to operate, maintain, and develop part of the port for 40 years. The investment plan includes €36 million for further development and heavy maintenance.

=== Motorway concessions ===
As of January 2026, the GEK Terna fully owns:

- Kentriki Odos, the operator of the A1 motorway between Skarfeia and Raches, and the A3 motorway;
- Nea Odos, the operator of the A1 motorway between Metamorfosi and Skarfeia, and the A5 north of Antirrio.

GEK Terna also has a stake in the following motorway and expressway concessions:

- 90% of Nea Attiki Odos, the operator of the Attiki Odos motorway network since 6 October 2024: GEK Terna briefly owned 100% of Nea Attiki Odos until 8 October the same year, when it sold 10% of its stake to Marianna Latsis (via Latsco Direct Investments);
- 75% of Nea Egnatia Odos (continued from Egnatia Odos on 31 December 2025), the operator of the A1 motorway north of Kleidi, as well as the A2, A25, and A29 motorways;
- 20.48% of Olympia Odos, operator of the A5 motorway south of Rio, and the A8 motorway.

== See also ==
- Energy in Greece
