= National Bank of Greece =

Large bank in Greece

Coordinates: 37°58′51.6″N 23°43′44.5″E

National Bank of Greece S.A.

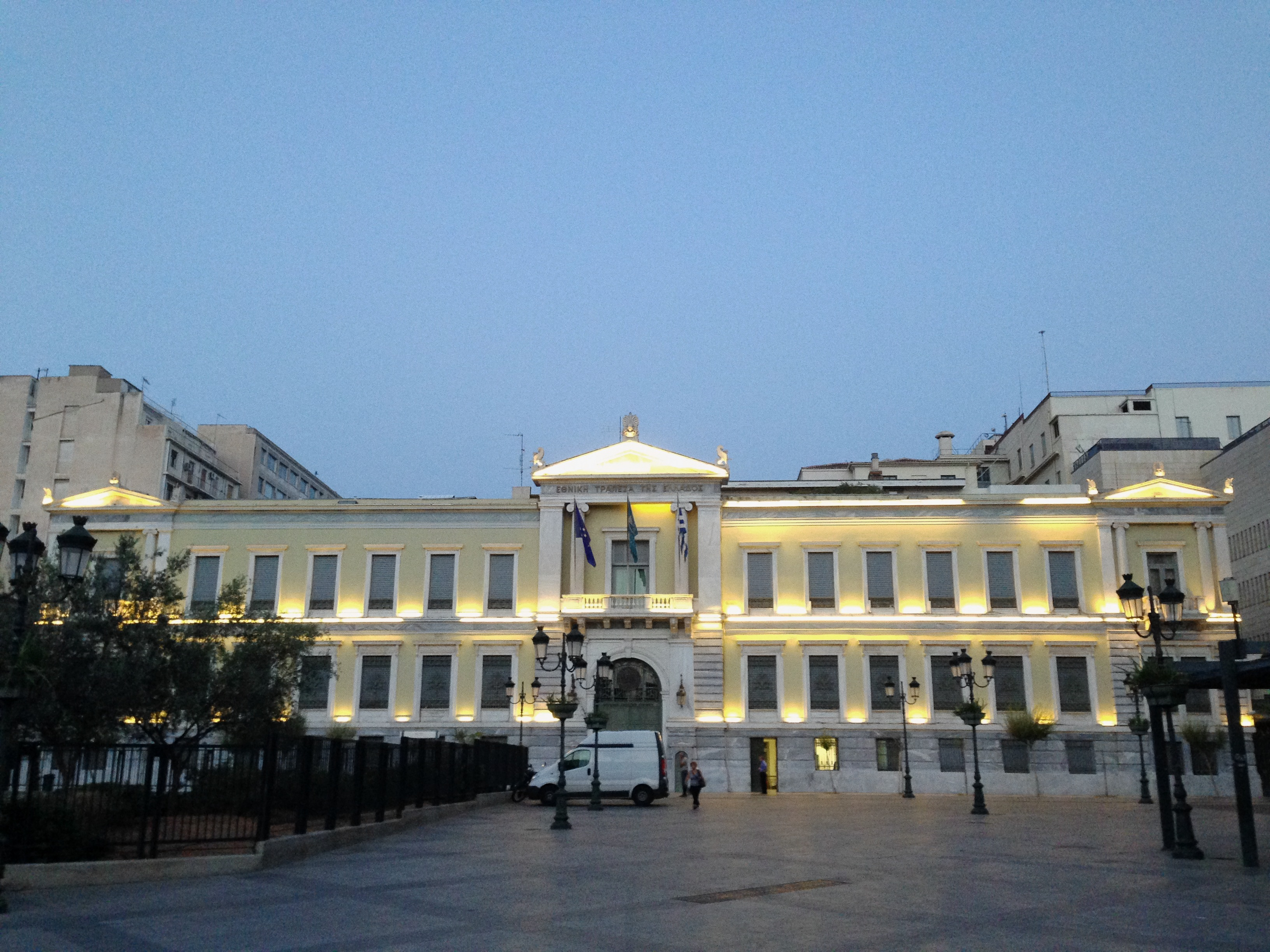
- Historic NBG building on Kotzia Square, Athens
- Native name: Εθνική Τράπεζα της Ελλάδος Α.Ε.
- Type: Public
- Traded as: Athex: ETE
- ISIN: GRS003003035
- Industry: Financial services
- Founded: 30 March 1841; 185 years ago in Athens, Greece
- Headquarters: Athens, Greece
- Number of locations: 356 branches in Greece
- Area served: Cyprus; Greece; Luxembourg; United Kingdom
- Key people: Pavlos Mylonas (CEO); Gikas Hardouvelis (Chairperson)
- Revenue: ▼€1.903 billion (2021)
- Operating income: ▼€799 million (2021)
- Net income: ▲€869 million (2021)
- Total assets: €77.590 billion (Q2 2025)
- Total equity: ▲€5.772 million (2021)
- Owner: Hellenic Financial Stability Fund (8%)
- Number of employees: 8,800
- Subsidiaries: Bankteco; Ethniki Leasing; National Bank of Greece (Cyprus); NBG Asset Management Luxembourg; NBG International (UK); Stopanska Banka (94.64%)
- Capital ratio: Common Equity Tier 1 capital = 15.7% (fully loaded Basel III)
- Website: nbg.gr

The National Bank of Greece (NBG; Greek: Εθνική Τράπεζα της Ελλάδος, romanized: Ethnikī́ Trápeza tīs Elládos) is a banking and financial services company with its headquarters in Athens, Greece. Founded in 1841 as the newly independent country's first financial institution, it has long been the largest Greek bank, a position it still held in the early 21st century. Following the financial turmoil of the Greek government-debt crisis in the 2010s, it remains one of Greece's four dominant banks together with Alpha Bank, Eurobank Ergasias, and Piraeus Bank. It has been designated as a Significant Institution since the entry into force of European Banking Supervision in 2014, and as a consequence is directly supervised by the European Central Bank. NBG offers financial products and services for corporate and institutional clients along with private and business customers. Services include banking services, brokerage, insurance, asset management, shipping finance, leasing and factoring markets.

The National Bank of Greece was Greece's dominant bank of issue from 1842 to 1928. As a consequence of Greece's territorial expansion, it shared the issuance privilege on a local basis with the Ionian Bank in the Ionian Islands between 1864 and 1920, with the Privileged Bank of Epirothessaly in those regions between 1882 and 1899, and with the Bank of Crete in Crete between 1899 and 1919. In 1920, it recovered its original issuance monopoly following its acquisition of the Bank of Crete and revocation of the Ionian Bank's note-issuance privilege. That monopoly was transferred in 1928 to the Bank of Greece, newly established as the country's central bank under oversight of the Economic and Financial Organization of the League of Nations.

NBG has been listed on the Athens Stock Exchange since the latter's founding in 1880, and was also listed on the New York Stock Exchange from 1999 to 2015.(NYSE:NBG, ADR, ISIN US6336437057). Its development has included major acquisitions such as those of the Privileged Bank of Epirothessaly in 1899, the Bank of Crete in 1919, and the Bank of Athens in 1953.

== History ==
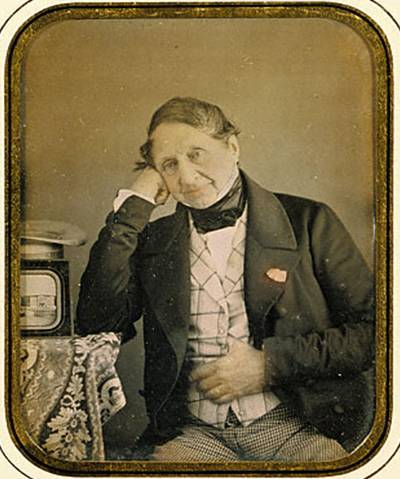
Jean-Gabriel Eynard

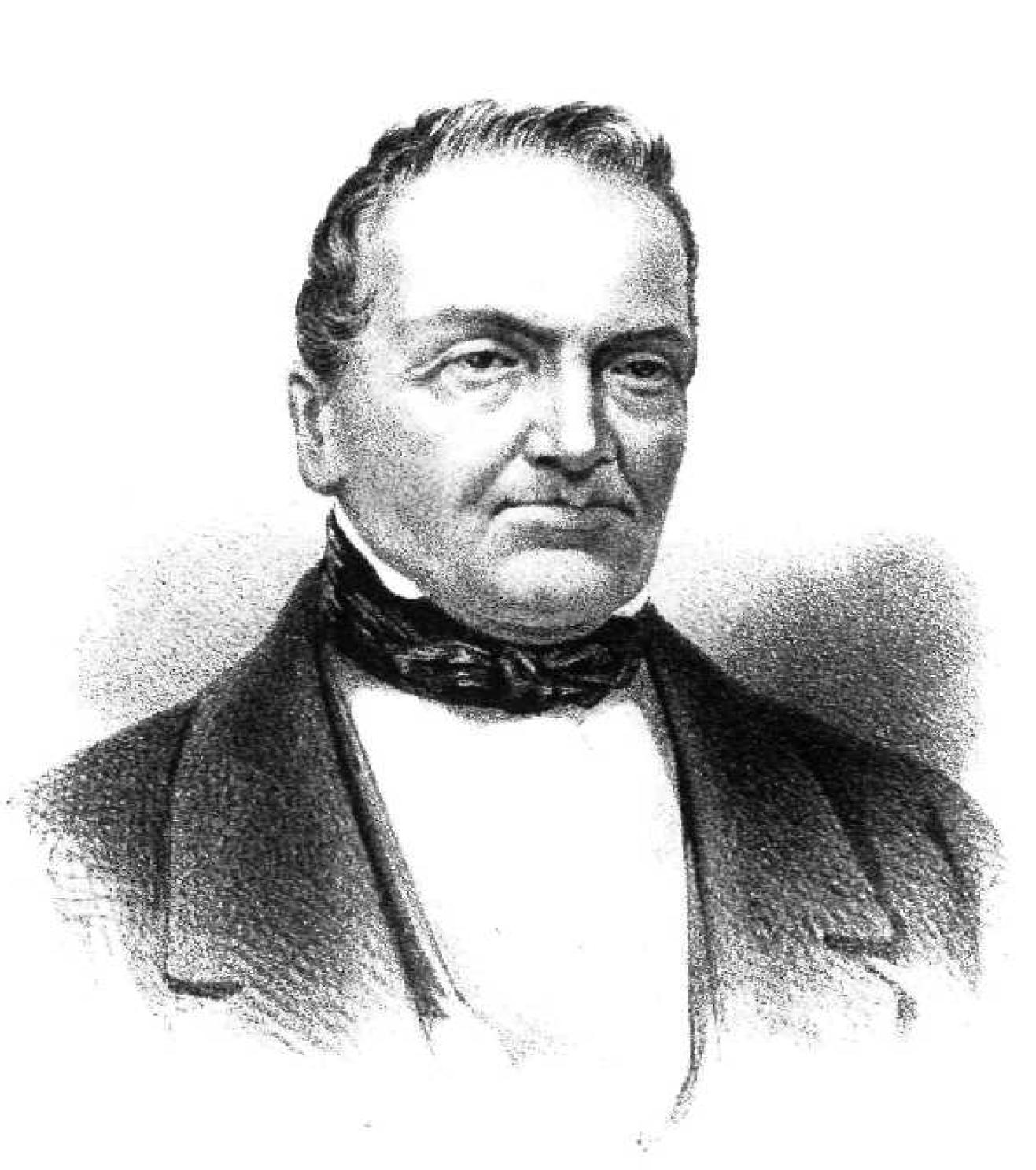
Georgios Stavrou

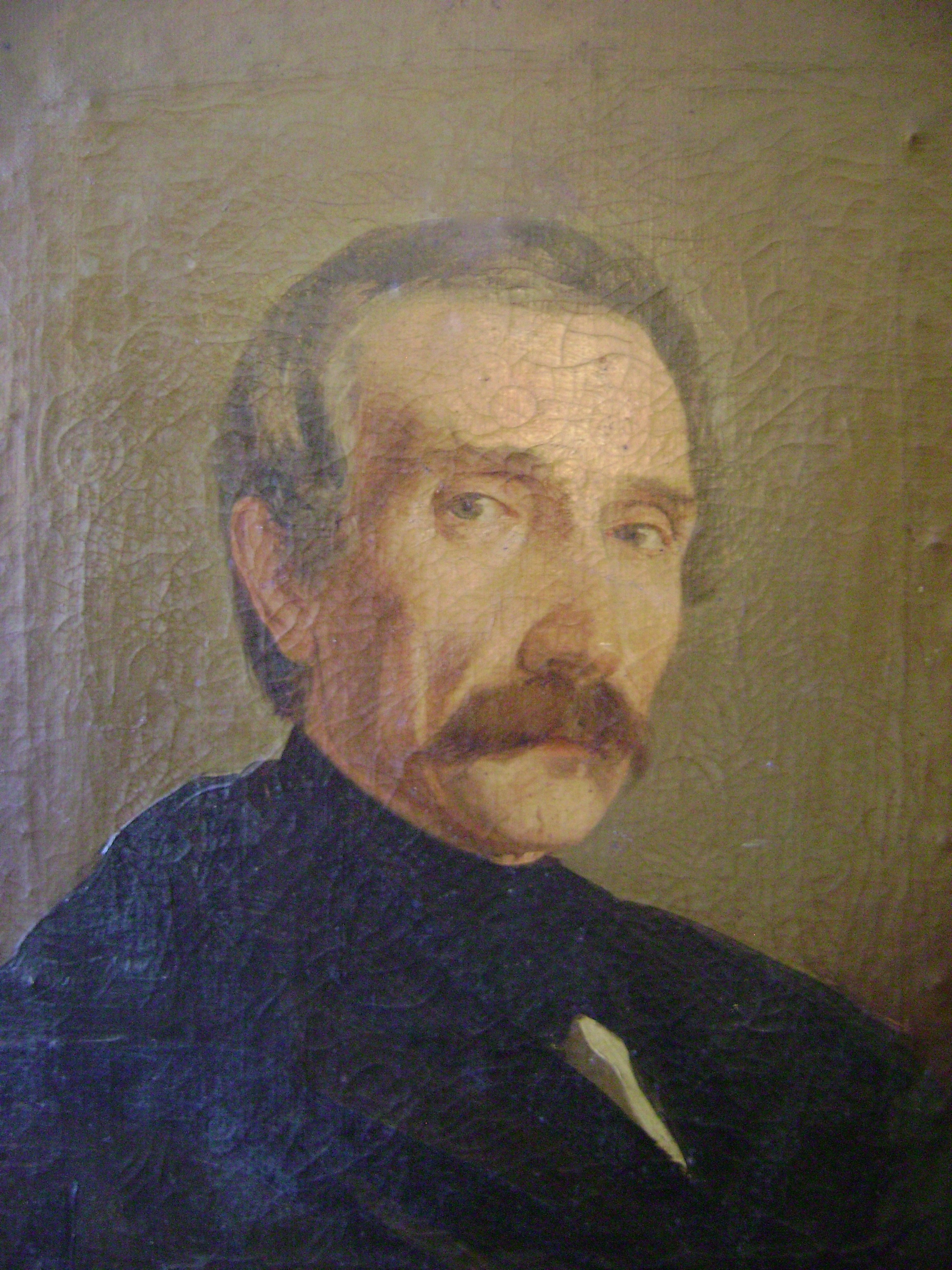
Julius von Hößlin(Έσσλιν)

=== 19th century ===
The bankers Jean-Gabriel Eynard and Georgios Stavros founded NBG in 1841 as a commercial bank. Stavros was also elected as the first director of the Bank until his death in 1869. The bank's creation was acknowledged by the decree "On the establishment of (a) National Bank" (Official Gazette, no. 6 March 30, 1841, p. 59), according to which the National Bank is a private limited company based in Athens with a capital of 5,000,000 drachmas, divided into 5,000 shares of 1,000 drachmas. It was the first bank in the Modern Greek state's history. (The Ionian Bank was established in 1838 but only started operations in 1842 and initially operated only in the United States of the Ionian Islands, a separate polity at the time.)

At its founding the major shareholder of the National Bank was the Greek state with 1,000 shares out of 3,402. Other major shareholders were Nicholas Zosimas with 500 shares, Jean-Gabriel Eynard with 300 shares, King Louis of Bavaria with 200 shares, Konstantinos Vranis with 150 shares, Adolf Graf with 146 shares and Theodoros Rallis with 100 shares. Rothshild Frères Paris bought 50 shares and Jean-Gabriel Eynard bought another 50 shares in their name to boost the prestige of the new bank. It used to have the sole right of note issue, which it lost in 1928 when the newly established Bank of Greece took over as the country's central bank. In 1880, NBG was listed in the Athenas Stock Exchange. In 1899, NBG acquired the Privileged Bank of Epirothessaly.

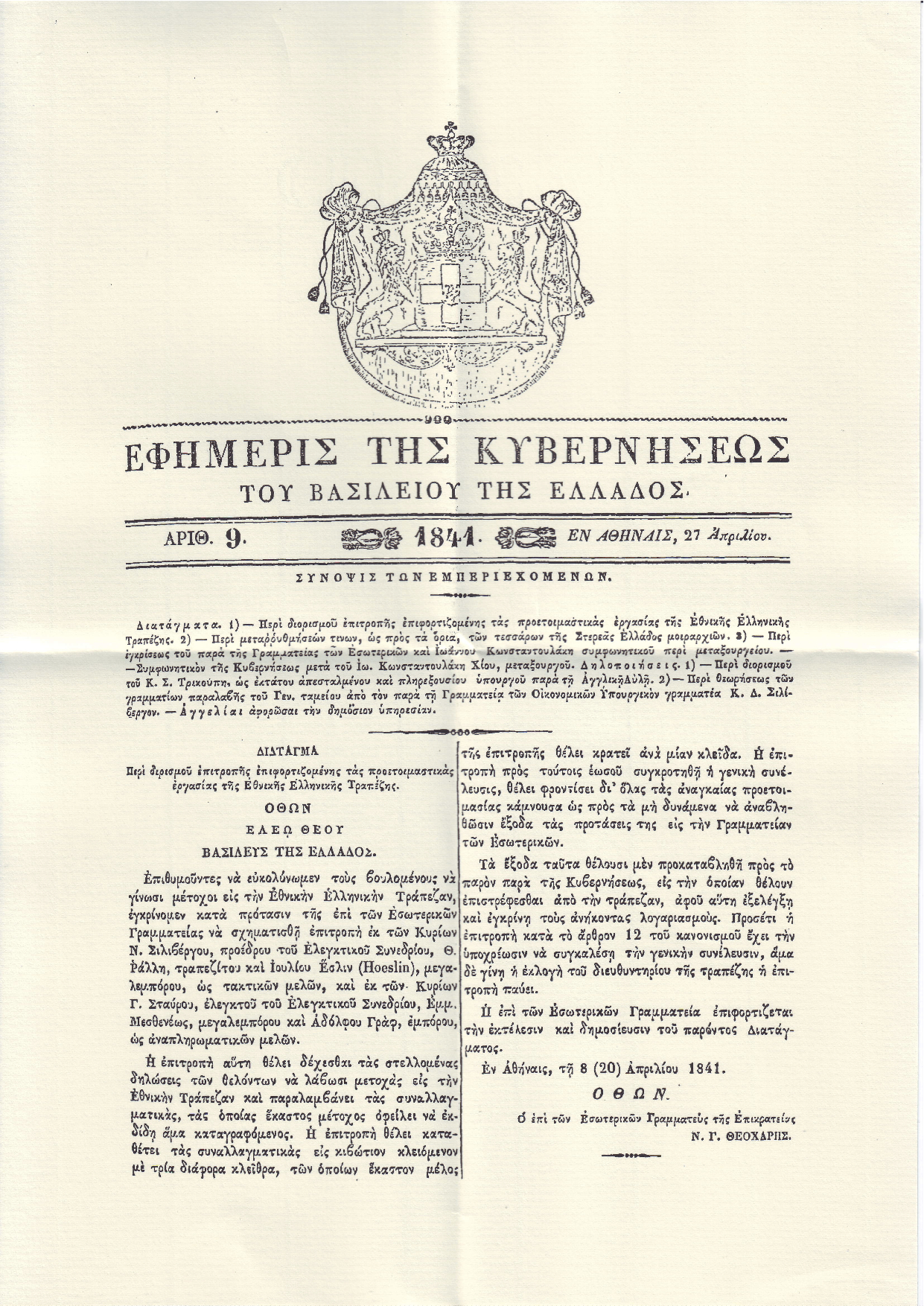
Royal decree on the foundation of the National Bank of Greece, 27 April 1841

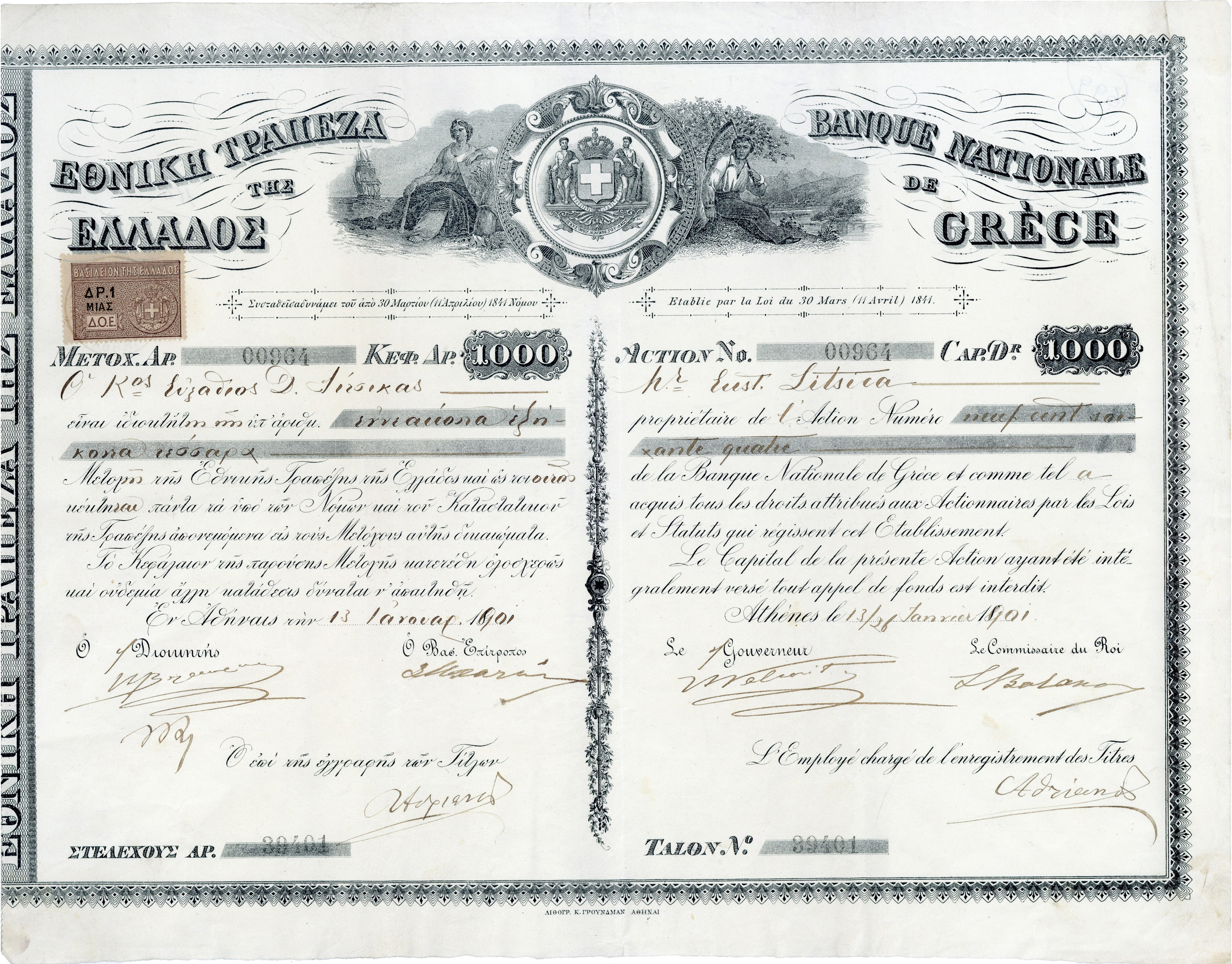
Stock certificate of the National Bank of Greece for 1000 drachmas, issued in Athens on 13 (26) January 1901

=== 20th century ===
The arrival of the 20th Century saw NBG begin its international expansion. In 1904 NBG established the Banque d'Orient as a joint venture with Nationalbank für Deutschland, which soon withdrew from the venture and sold the branches in Constantinople and Hamburg. The Banque d'Orient kept its branches in Salonica and Smyrna, which were part of the Ottoman Empire at the time, and Alexandria in Egypt. Three years later, NBG established a first overseas branch of its own in Cyprus. NBG became government-owned during the First World War when NBG refused to finance new military equipment for the Greek government. The government then passed a law that permitted the government to appoint its own people to the Bank's board.

In 1919 NBG acquired the Bank of Crete (Trapeza Kritis). However, in 1923 the Treaty of Lausanne provided for a compulsory exchange of populations between Greece and Turkey, leading to the departure of the Greeks from Smyrna. As a result, Banque d'Orient closed its branch there. The influx of more than 1 million refugees to Greece during this period created several challenges; NBG played a pivotal role in their settlement with loans and related instruments.

The 1930s saw further international expansion. In 1930 NBG and Bank of Athens combined their activities in Egypt into a joint subsidiary, Banque Nationale de Grèce et d'Athènes. Two years later, NBG acquired full ownership of the Banque d'Orient. Then in 1939, on the eve of the Second World War, the NBG established a subsidiary in New York City, the Hellenic Bank Trust Company. Throughout the interwar period, the NBG was widely viewed as representing British capital in Greece, not least through its longstanding association with London-based Hambros Bank, whereas its smaller competitor the Bank of Athens was perceived as aligned with French interests.

In 1941, during the Axis Occupation of Greece, Deutsche Bank assumed oversight of the bank, which entailed operational control even though it did not technically take over its shares out of consideration for Italian sensitivities.

In 1953 the NBG took over the Bank of Athens, which was at that time the second largest Bank in Greece. Both banks cooperated before in their foreign branches in Middle East which were operated as Banque Nationale de Grèce et d'Athènes. The NBG took over also the affiliated South African Bank of Athens (est. 1947). The former headquarters of the Bank of Athens are also still used until today. In 1960 Egypt nationalised all banks in Egypt, including Banque Nationale de Grèce et d'Athènes, which it merged into National Bank of Egypt.

In 1965 NBG acquired the Greek Trapeza Epagelmatikis Pistis (Professional Credit Bank). The next year bank governor Georgios Mavros founded the Cultural Foundation of the National Bank. In 1978 the Greek government permitted the formation of Arab Hellenic Bank with 49% Arab ownership, as an exception to its prohibition on foreign banks owning more than 40% of the equity of a Greek bank. NBG held 51% and provided most of the bank staff. The Libyan Arab-Foreign Bank and Kuwaiti Investment Organisation held 40% between them while other Arab investors held 9%. That same year NBG opened again a branch in Cairo. In 1994 NBG incorporated its branches in Cyprus into a subsidiary: National Bank of Greece (Cyprus). The next year the Greek government dissolved the insolvent Arab Hellenic Bank at a cost to Greece's Deposit Guarantee Fund of €1.5 million in payments to depositors. In 1998 the Swiss architect Mario Botta won the competition for the new wing of the headquarters, the building was completed in 2001. In 1998 NBG merged with the Ethniki Ktimatiki Trapeza Ellados (National Mortgage Bank of Greece), itself the result of the merger of the National Mortgage Bank and the National Housing Bank of Greece. In 1999 NBG started trading on the New York Stock Exchange.

=== 21st century ===
Recent head office extension in Athens

After the end of communism in Eastern Europe, NBG took advantage of the opportunity to expand to Southeast Europe. In April 2000, in a joint deal with the European Bank for Reconstruction and Development (EBRD) and IFC, NBG acquired a majority stake in Stopanska Banka (Skopje, North Macedonia). In July, National Bank of Greece acquired 89.9% of the United Bulgarian Bank (UBB).

In 2002 NBG merged with ETEBA (National Investment Bank for Industrial Development), but NBG's attempted merger with Alpha Bank fell through. The next year, NBG bought Banca Romaneasca, a Romanian bank, and currently holds 88.7% of all outstanding shares. Banca Romaneasca has 90 branches.

However, while it was expanding to Southeast Europe, NBG was retreating in North America and other places serving the Greek diaspora. The first move occurred in 2005 when NBG sold all its operations in Canada to Bank of Nova Scotia. The next year NBG sold its US arm, Atlantic Bank of New York, to New York Community Bancorp for US$400 million (€331 million) in cash. It then used proceeds from the sale to help finance further acquisitions in southeast Europe. In 2004 the Institute for Corporate Culture Affairs was founded by NBG and Deutsche Bank as not-for-profit institute based in Frankfurt.

In 2006 NBG acquired 46% of the shares of Finansbank in Turkey, a share that it increased in 2007 to 80%. Hüsnü Özyeğin reported in the initial press conference when NBG announced its 46% share purchase that he would have "loved to have been offered National Bank of Greece shares instead of cash, however there were no shares available" (outside of the current shares floated in the free market). Still in 2006, NBG acquired 99.44% of Serbia's Vojvođanska banka for €385 million.

At home, in 2005, as part of the NBG Group's ongoing effort to improve its portfolio structure and effectively respond to changes in the domestic and international markets, the Boards of Directors of National Bank of Greece S.A. and National Investment Company S.A. decided to merge the two companies through absorption of the latter by the Bank. Two years later, NBG merged with National Management & Organization Co. (the issuer of "Ethnokarta"). At the time, NBG already held 100% of National Management & Organization Co. shares. Also in 2007, NBG concluded the acquisition of P&K Investment Services SA. The acquisition created the largest provider of brokerage and investment services in Greece. NBG plans to expand this business to all countries where NBG has a presence.

The bank suffered following the Greek government debt crisis holding part of the debt. The bank wrote off more than $19 billion; €10 billion ($12.7 billion) of it in the restructuring of the debt.

On 18 February 2011 NBG made an offer to buy Alpha Bank for €2.8 billion. and another offer to buy Emporiki Bank, both offers were not successful, Emporiki Bank was then bought by Alpha Bank.

In January 2013 NBG made an offer to take over the Eurobank Ergasias this was not completed. The 64,000 Eurobank shareholders and the Greek capital market commission agreed. Some weeks after the proposed buyout that fell through, NBG presented the plans to reduce the staff of the new banking group, many of them by taking early retirement. The merger was criticized, as some said that the new bank would be too big if it had to be sold, but one of the bankers said that much bigger banks have been sold. The NBG absorbed the healthy assets and liabilities of the Greek FBBank in 2013. The European Commission in July 2014 approved restructuring plans for NBG after finding that state aid was not hampering competition.

On 28 November 2015, the New York Stock Exchange announced that American depositary receipts ("ADRs") of National Bank of Greece S.A. were in the process of being delisted following a 14% value decline on Friday 27 November 2015 and a year-to-date slump of 91%. While the year-to-date plunge of 91% was a major factor, the exchange stated that the National Bank of Greece is no longer suitable for listing based on "abnormally low" prices of the ADRs, pursuant to Section 802.01D of the NYSE Listed Company Manual. Also, the bank failed to meet the trading standards and also failed to cross the $1.00 mark since mid-July, resulting in the NYSE's determination to delist the bank's ADRs.

On 4 December 2015, the European Commission approved state aid amounting to €2.71 billion.

In December 2015, the bank announced it would sell Turkish subsidiary Finansbank to the Qatari QNB Group, in order to pay down its expensive central bank debt. Including €910 million of subordinate debt, a sum of €2.75 billion in cash was agreed upon. In 2015 National Bank of Greece announced it would sell NBGI Private Equity. In September 2016, the transaction of selling it funds to Stage Capital was completed.

In March 2017, the bank entered into an agreement to sell its South African subsidiary South African Bank of Athens to AFGRI Holdings. The sale was completed in October 2018. The bank was renamed GroBank.

National Bank of Greece has faced bad loans due to the debt crisis in the country and has opted for securitizations projects since 2020. In February 2020, NBG announced the project Frontier, which consisted of the securitization of non-performing loans. NBG's Frontier portfolio is composed of more than 6.0 billion euros of non-performing mortgages, small and medium-sized business loans, as customer loans. In June 2020, NGB hired Morgan Stanley to advise on bad debt sales.

In March 2021, NGB announced the project Frontier 2 for reducing the non-performing credit exposure ratio from 13.6 percent to 6-7 percent. National Bank of Greece's impaired loans fell to 4.2 billion euros in the first quarter of 2021. In July 2021, NBG picked DoValue, Bain Capital and Fortress as preferred bidders on bad loans sale.

In November 2023, the HFSF reduced its stake in NBG from 40.39% to 20,39%, as part of a broader re-privatization of Greek lenders bailed-out during the crisis. In October 2024, the HFSF sold a 10% stake in NGB and will transfer its remaining 8.4% stake in National Bank to Greece’s sovereign wealth fund by the end of 2024.

== Branches ==
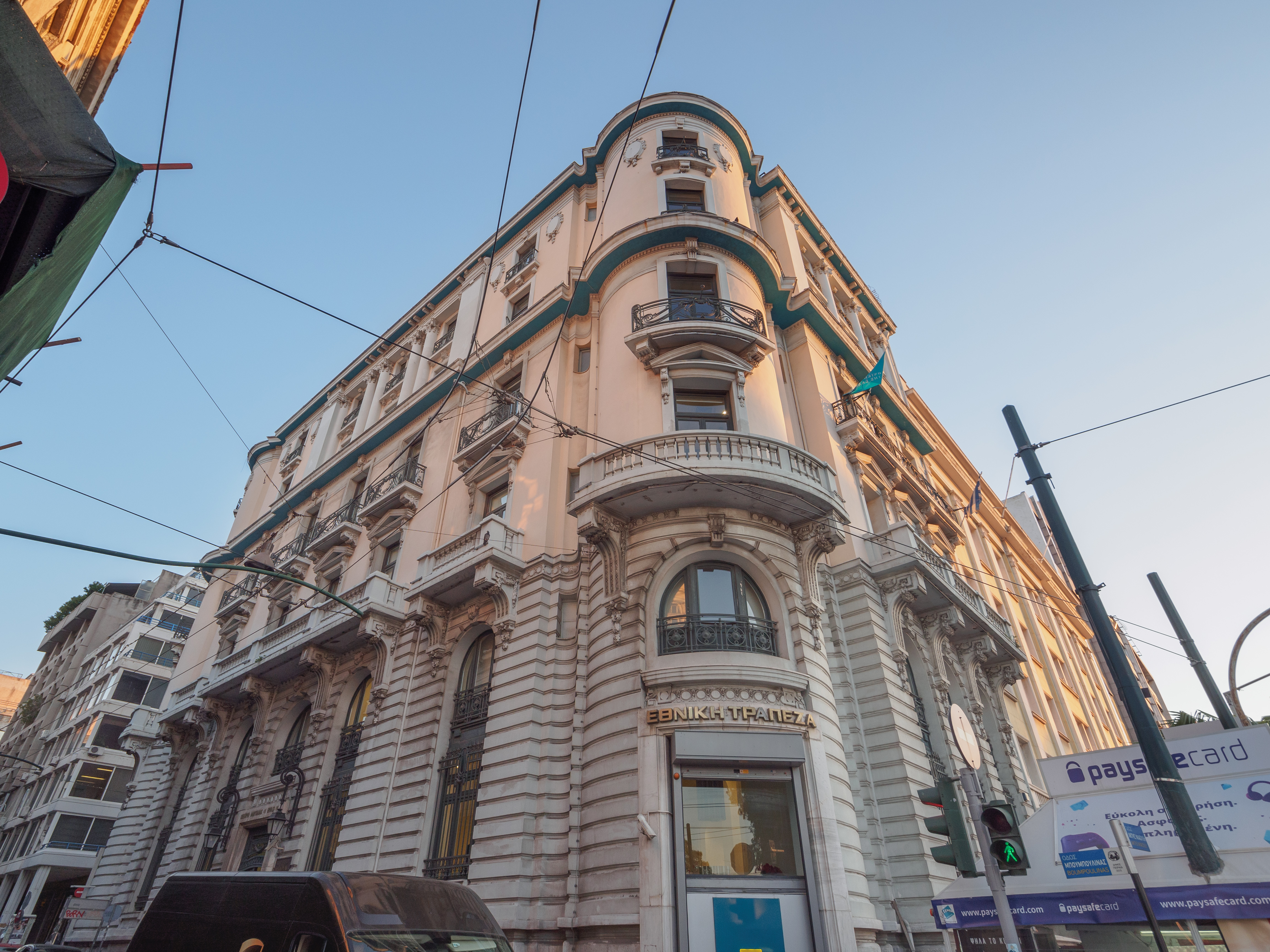
Branch building in Piraeus

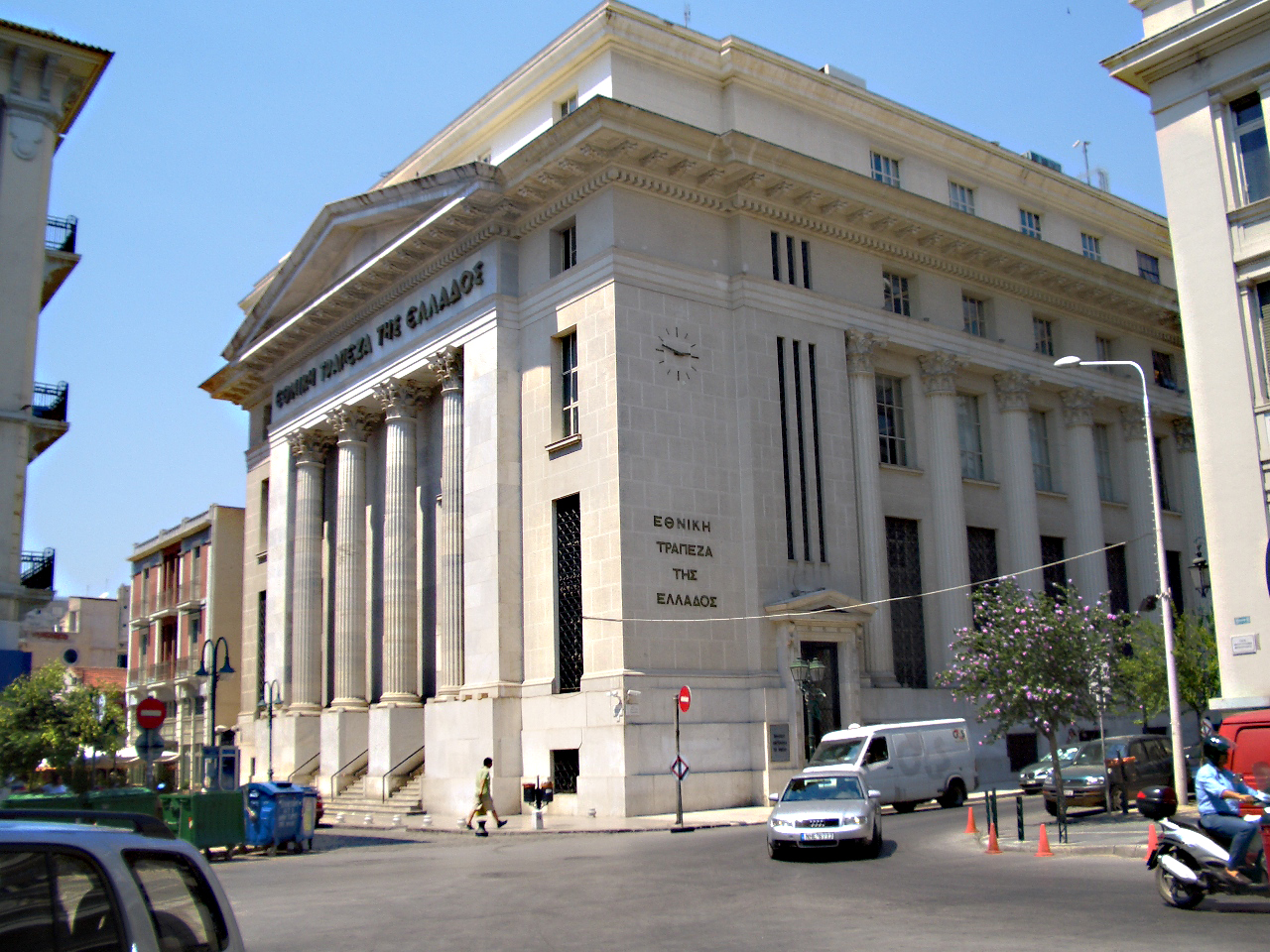
Branch building in Thessaloniki (shared with the Bank of Greece)

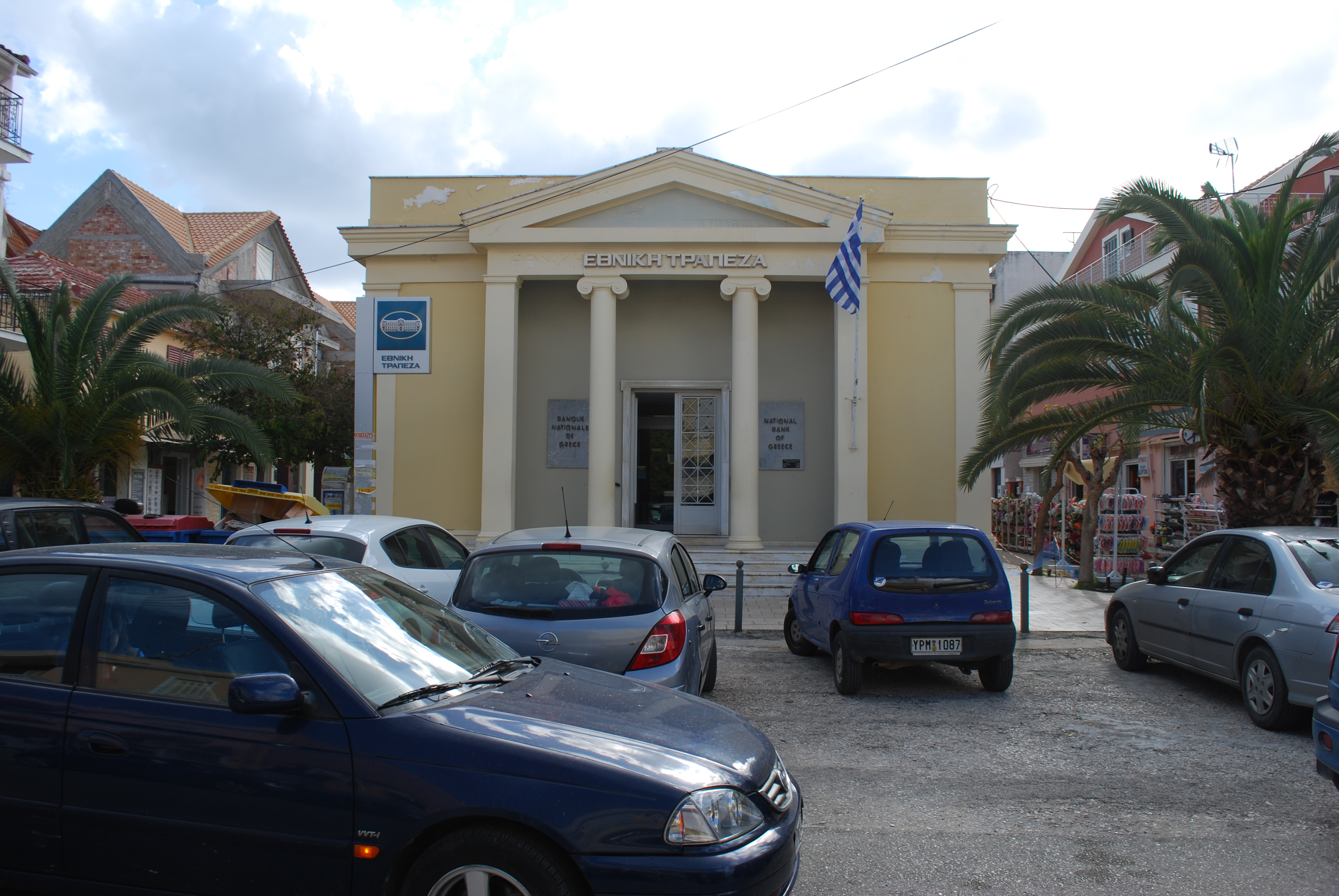
Branch building in Cephalonia

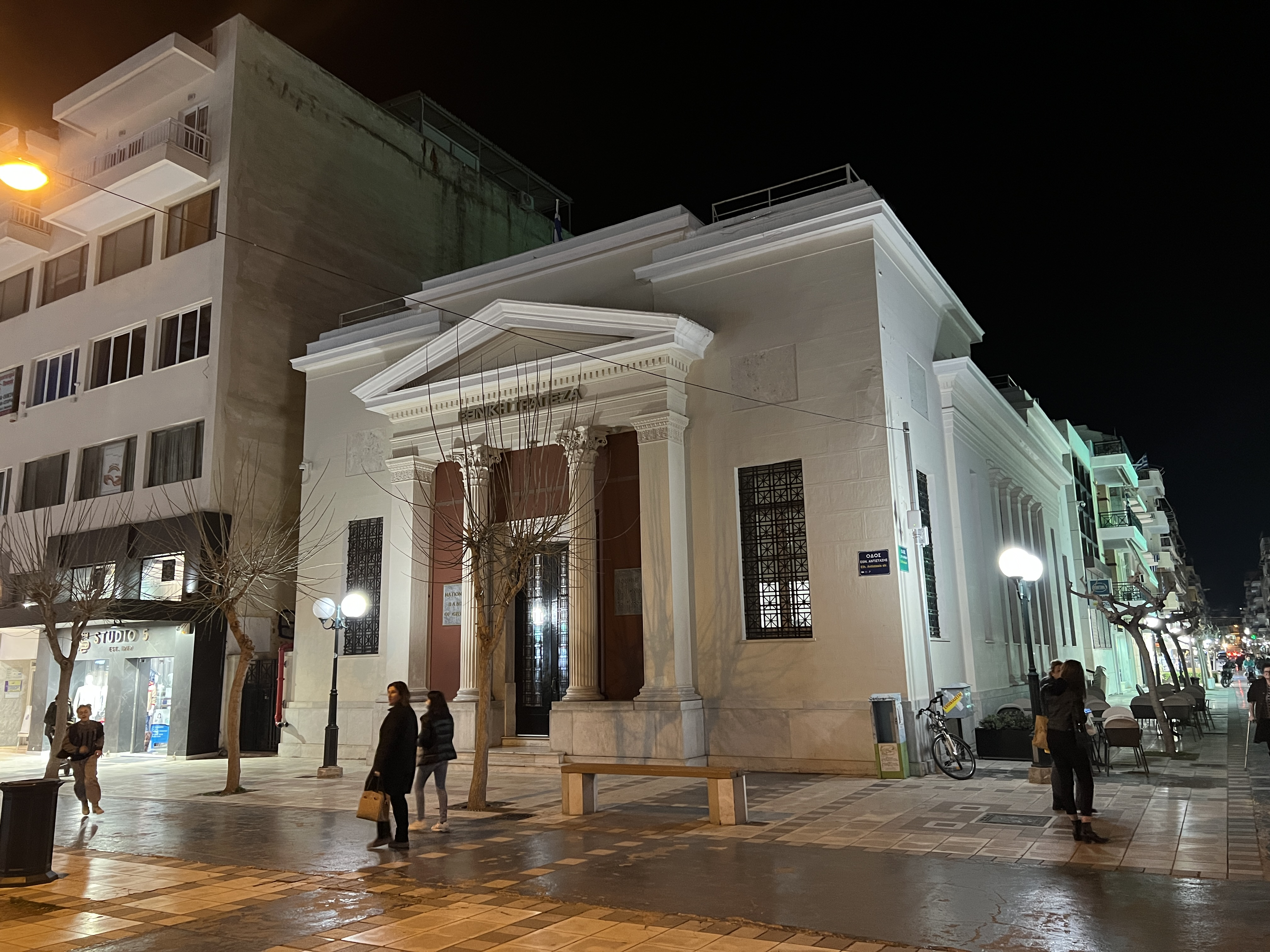
Branch building in Corinth

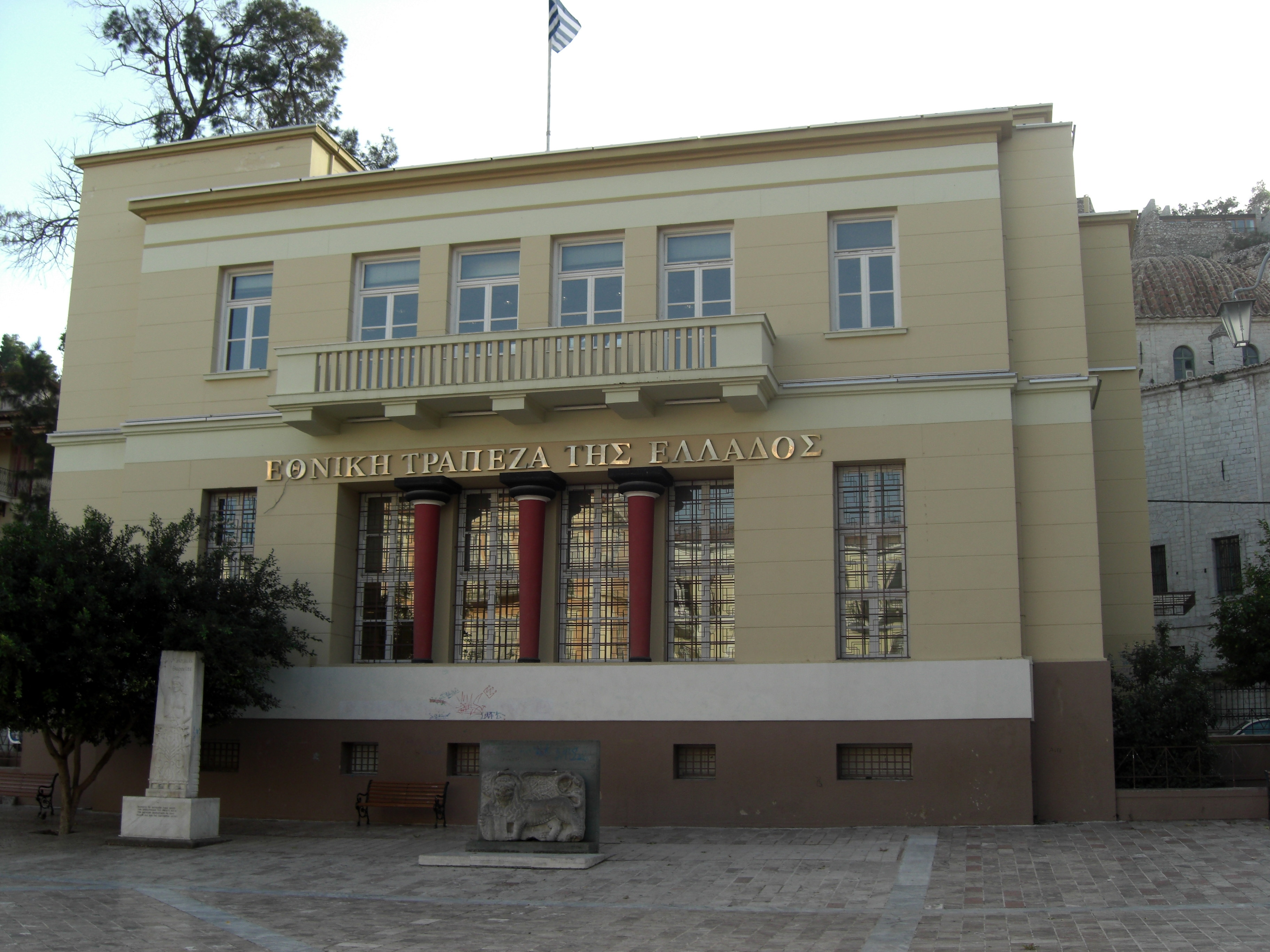
Branch building in Nafplio

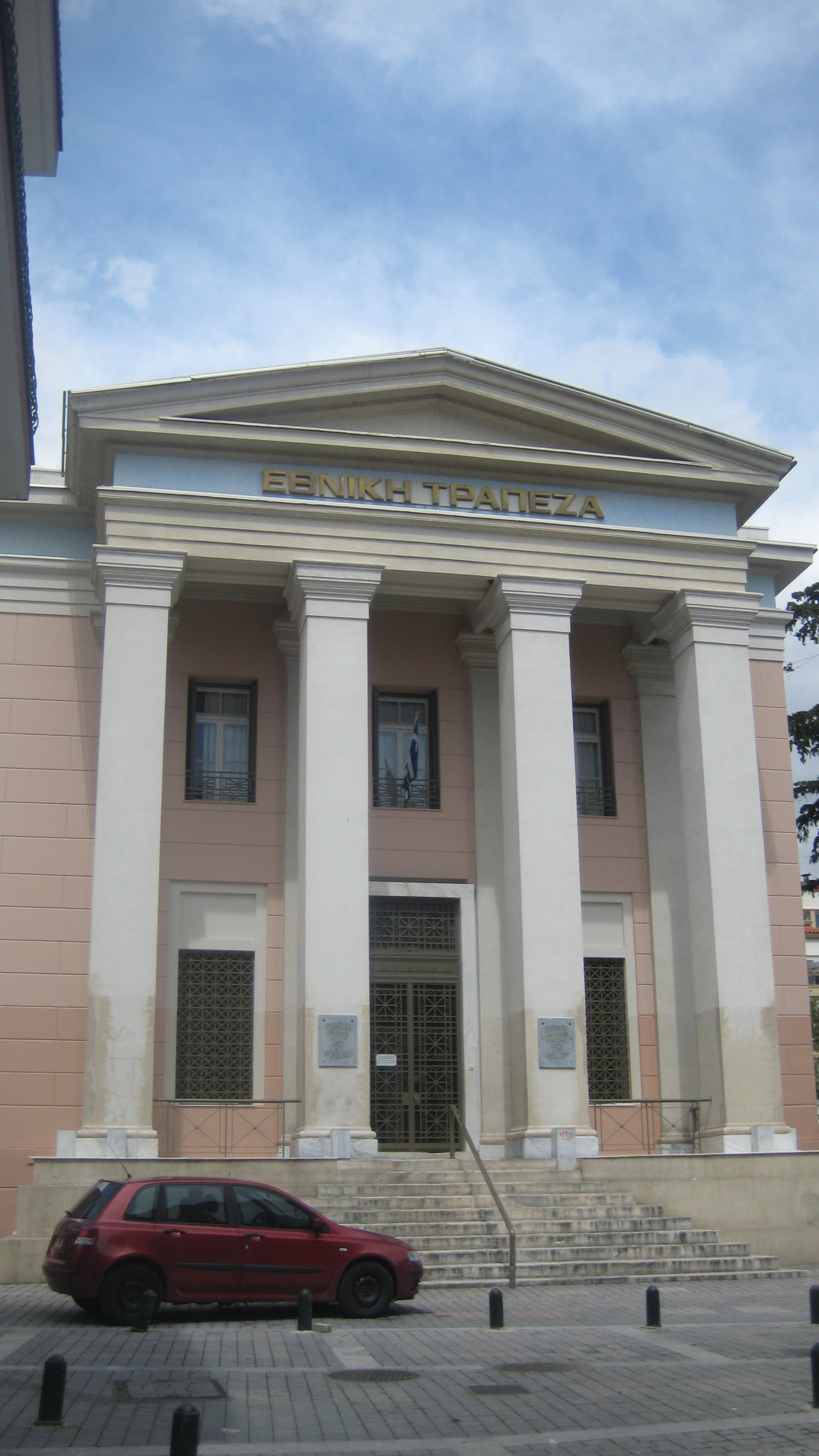
Branch building in Xanthi

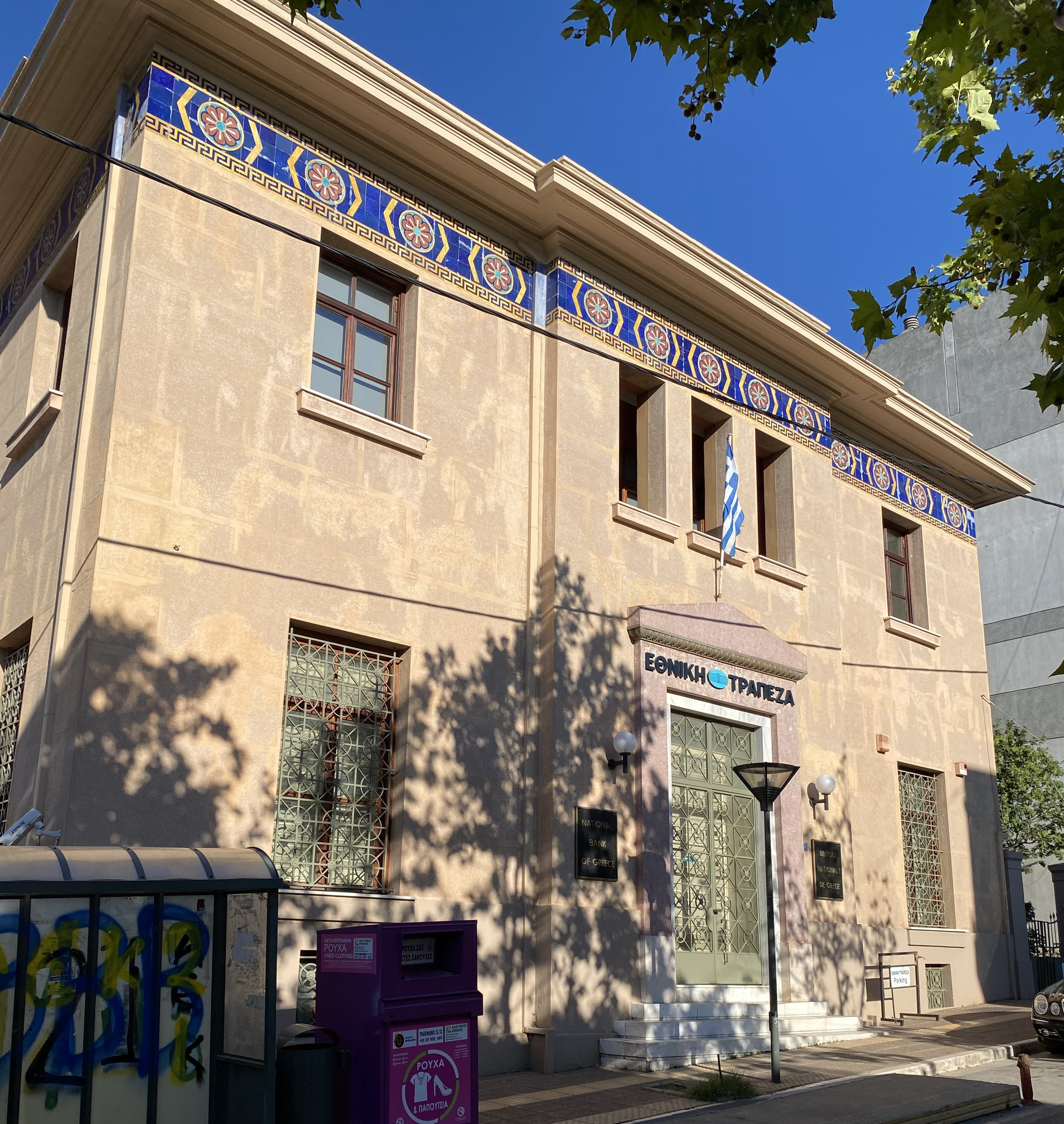
Branch building in Thiva

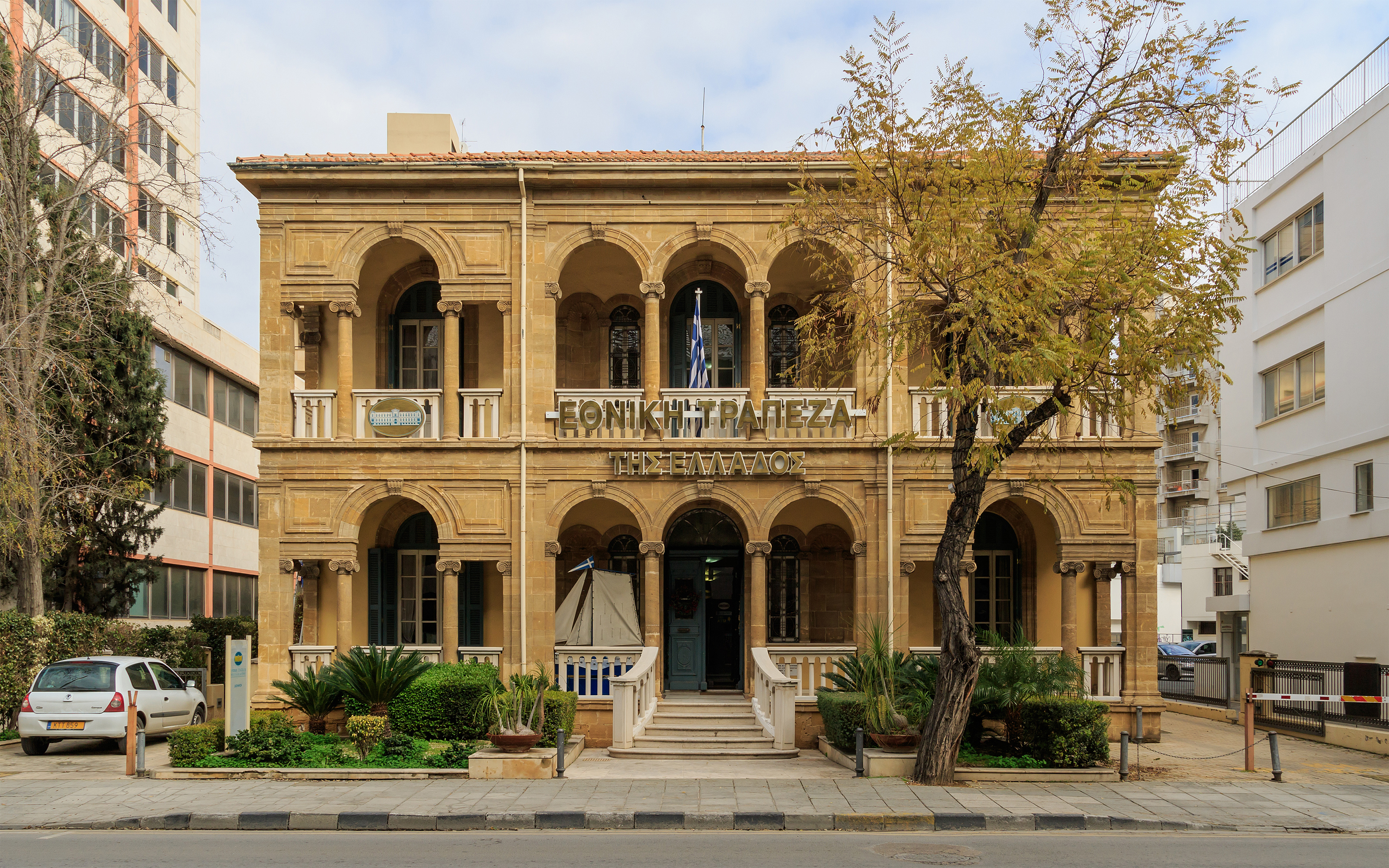
National Bank of Greece on Makariou Avenue in Nicosia, Cyprus

The bank has over 500 branches in Greece and some in Cyprus and the United Kingdom. It owns two subsidiary banks one in North Macedonia and one in Cyprus, as well as a branch of the Greek parent in Cyprus.

=== Acquisitions ===
- Bank of Crete, Greece, 1919
- Bank of Athens, Greece, 1953
- Stopanska Banka, North Macedonia, 2000 to present
- United Bulgarian Bank, Bulgaria, 2000–2017
- Banca Romaneasca, Romania, 2002–2017
- Vojvođanska banka, Serbia, 2005–2017
- Finansbank, Turkey, 2006–2015

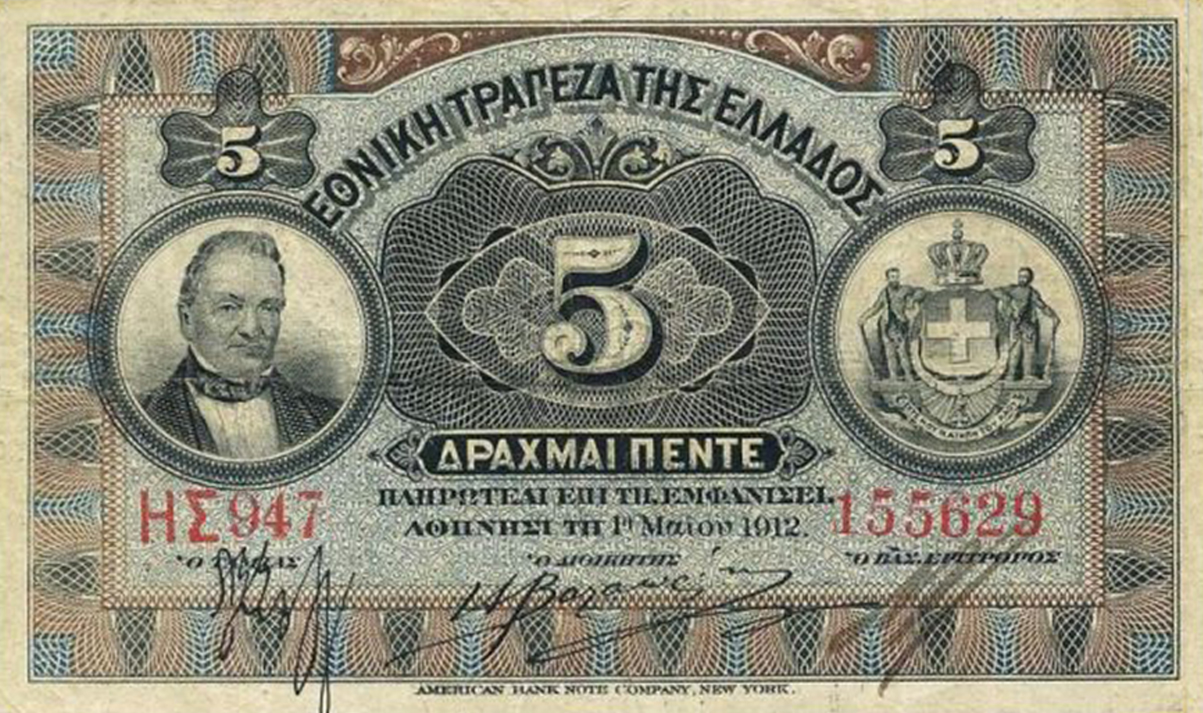
A Greek banknote issued by the NBG in 1912 with the portrait of Georgios Stavrou

== Patronage and sponsorship ==
The NBG conducts philanthropy through the Cultural Foundation of the National Bank and other endeavours like book printing and theatres.

The NBG organizes the i-bank Competition Innovation & Technology competition rewarding original ideas based in new technologies on i-banking and e-commerce (3rd competition in 2012).

During the crisis in Greece the health sector was significantly affected so the NBG built a new wing of the Evangelismos Hospital in Athens costing €30 million.

== See also ==
- Cultural Foundation of the National Bank (Greece)
- Inter-Alpha Group of Banks
- List of banks in the euro area
- List of banks in Greece
