= Bank of Crete =

Bank of Crete may refer to:

- Bank of Crete (1899–1919), bank established in 1899 in the autonomous Cretan State.
- Bank of Crete (1980–1999), bank established in 1980 in Greece.
