= Privileged Bank of Epirothessaly =

Former Greek bank

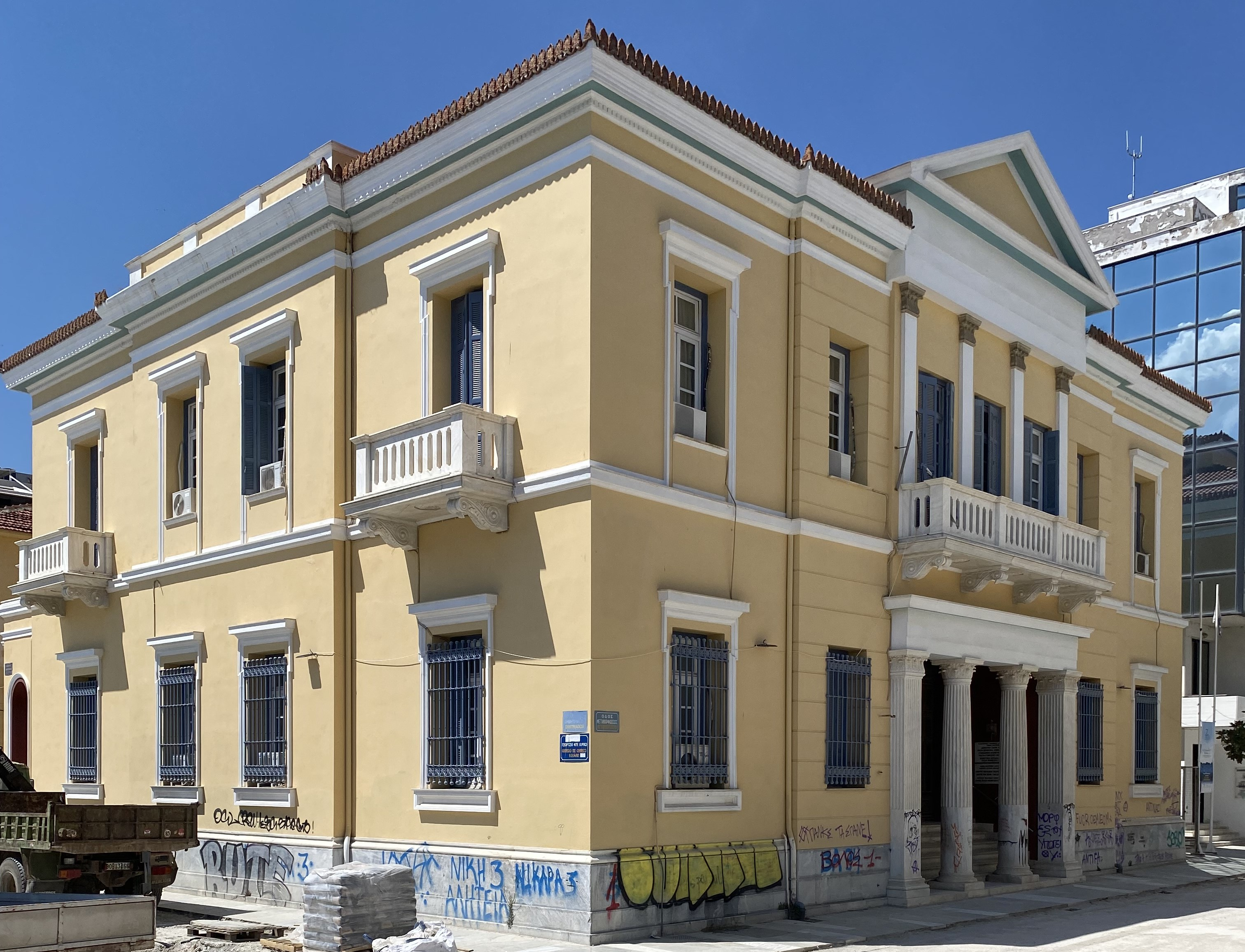
Former seat of the Bank of Epirothessaly in Volos

The Privileged Bank of Epirothessaly (Greek: Προνομιούχος Τράπεζα Ηπειροθεσσαλίας, French: Banque privilégiée d'Épirothessalie), sometimes referred to in English as Privileged Bank of Epirus and Thessaly, was one of Greece's four banks of issue before the 1928 establishment of the Bank of Greece, together with the National Bank of Greece, Ionian Bank, and Bank of Crete. It was founded in 1882 in Volos by Greek financier Andreas Syggros, and acquired in 1899 by the National Bank of Greece.

== Overview ==
Syggros, a financier from the Greek community in Constantinople, founded the bank on 1 January 1882 following the Greek annexation of most of Thessaly and part of Epirus (the Arta Prefecture) under the Convention of Constantinople (1881). Syggros was the bank's main shareholder, alongside the National Bank of Greece (NBG) and other French and Greek investors. The bank opened for business on 19 June 1882. It soon created branches in Almyros, Arta, Kalabaka, Larissa, Trikala as well as Athens.

The bank was commonly referred to internationally under its French name, since French was the vehicular language of finance in the Eastern Mediterranean at the time. The name "privileged" in its name refers to the government authorization to print banknotes. The latter were printed with one side in Greek and the other in French.

The bank's notes were not very widely accepted. As Thessaly was temporarily occupied by the Ottoman Army during the Greco-Turkish War of 1897, its financial position was negatively impacted by the damage. Following Syggros's death in February 1899, it was eventually acquired in December of that year and absorbed by the NBG.

Its building in the center of Volos was used by the NBG until being acquired by the municipality in 1969, and has been subsequently repurposed as a school of music.

== See also ==
- Banque de Salonique
- Bank of Athens
- List of banks in Greece
