= Kaplaneios School =

- Καπλάνειος Σχολή

Location
- Ioannina; Greece
- Coordinates: 39.6681°N 20.8543°E

Information
- Type: Academy and in 20th century elementary school
- Established: 1797
- Founder: Manthos and Zois Kaplanis
- Closed: 1820/1 and reestablished at 1926
- Headmaster: (1797-1820/1) Athanasios Psalidas
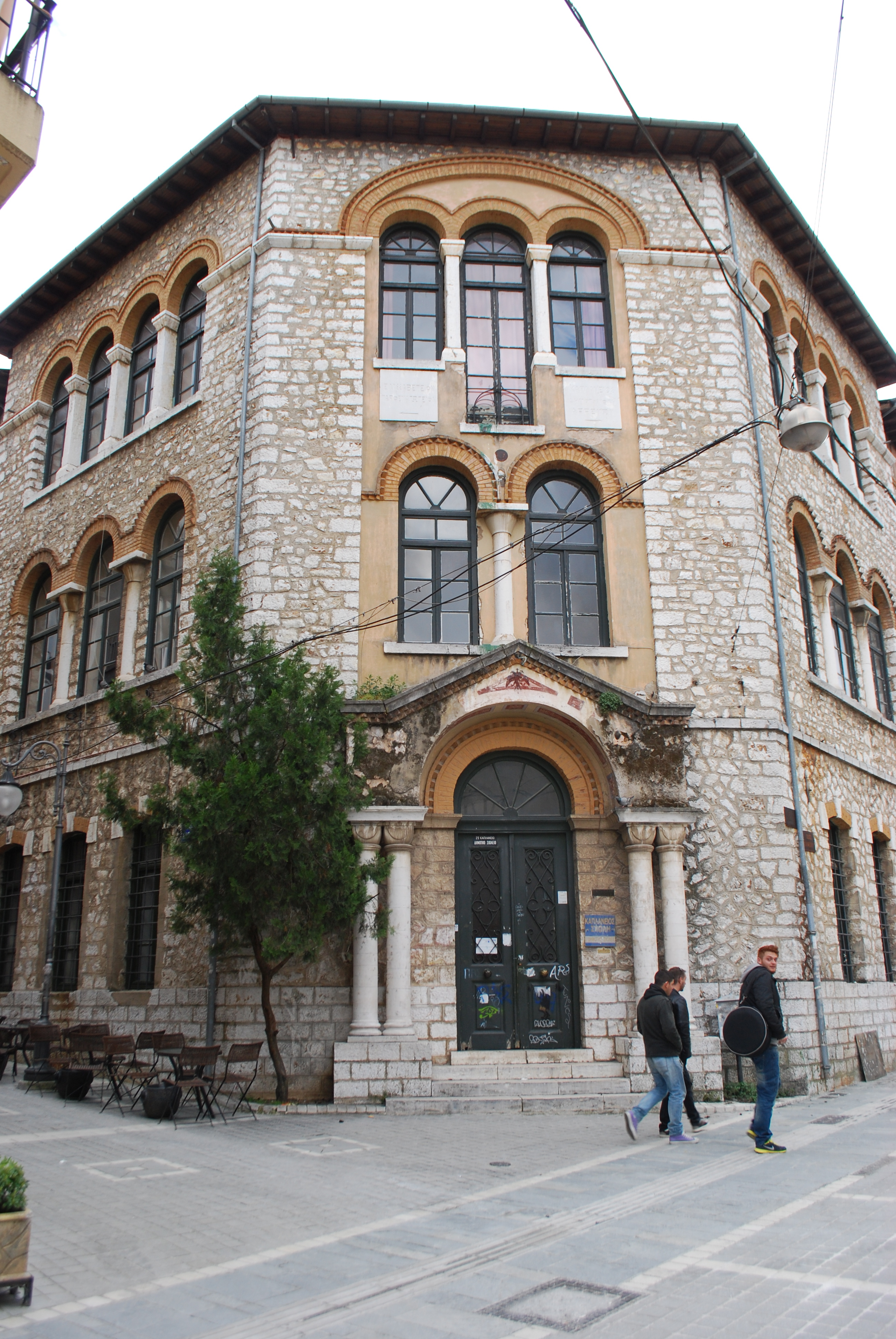
- The Kaplaneios School today

The Kaplaneios School (Greek: Καπλάνειος Σχολή) was a Greek educational institution that operated in Ioannina from 1797 to 1820/1. The school evolved into the most significant intellectual center of the city through the work of Athanasios Psalidas, a major representative of the modern Greek Enlightenment movement.

Kaplaneios was rebuilt during 1922–1926 and since that time has housed a number of primary schools.

== Under Athanasios Psalidas ==
The school was founded at the personal expense of the brothers Manthos and Zois Kaplanis, merchants and local benefactors. It succeeded another local school, the Maroutsaia, which closed due to financial problems. From its very start, Athanasios Psalidas, one of the main representatives of the modern Greek Enlightenment, took the initiative and became director of the school. The same year the Kaplaneios had its own library, while it came under the protection of the Phanar Greek Orthodox College of Istanbul (Constantinople) and acquired the alternative title Patriarchal Academy.

Psalidas initially faced an anachronistic and lethargic education system. In order to deal with this, he began a series of confrontations with the conservative community of Ioannina. He included in the curriculum lessons of experimental physics and was an ardent supporter of contemporary European ideologies and the vernacular (Demotic) Greek language. The students were also taught Ancient Greek literature and contemporary science, including Lavoisier's chemistry and Isaac Newton's Principia. Psalidas' main objective and aspiration was the intellectual uplifting and the political restoration of the Greek people. In his efforts to achieve this, he was assisted by the intelligent and religiously tolerant ruler of the region, Ali Pasha, who encouraged the education in Ioannina. Because of his progressive teaching methods, Psalidas was accused of atheism and voltairianism by conservative scholars.

== Destruction and revival ==
Soon however, the Greek Enlightenment process, in which Ioannina was a major center, came to an abrupt end, with the suppression of Ali Pasha's autonomist tendencies against the Porte as well as with the outbreak of the Greek War of Independence in 1821. The suppression of Ali Pasha resulted in the destruction of the schools of the city, including the Kaplaneios.

The school was rebuilt during 1922–1926, thanks to a bequest from Zois Kaplanis, and since that time has housed a number of primary schools.

== Notable graduates ==
- Angelos Kitsos
- Kosmas Thesprotos, scholar
- Georgios Stavros, banker
- Anastasios Sakellarios, first director of the Zosimaia School
