= 2 World Trade Center (1971–2001) =

Former skyscraper in Manhattan, New York

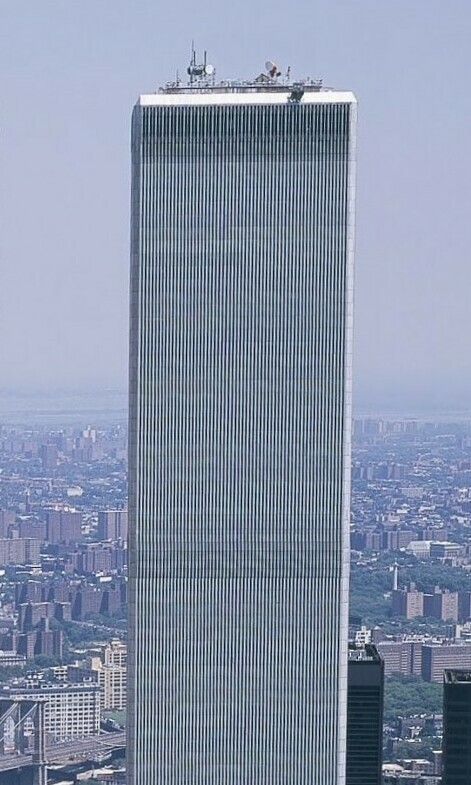
- The World Trade Center's South Tower (WTC2), pictured in 2000
- Alternative names: 2 WTC; South Tower; WTC 2; Building B; Building 2; Tower B; Tower 2

General information
- Status: Destroyed
- Location: Liberty Street, New York, NY 10048, United States
- Coordinates: 40°42′39.4″N 74°00′47.0″W
- Construction started: January 1969
- Topped-out: July 19, 1971
- Completed: 1973
- Opened: September 1971
- Inaugurated: April 4, 1973
- Destroyed: September 11, 2001, 9:59 a.m. Eastern Time Zone (Note: The collapse began at 9:58:59 a.m.; ergo it would not have been fully destroyed until 9:59.)
- Owner: Port Authority of New York and New Jersey
- Operator: Silverstein Properties

Height
- Roof: 1,362 ft (415 m)
- Observatory: 1,377 ft (420 m)

Technical details
- Floor count: 110
- Floor area: 4,759,040 sq ft (442,129 m^{2})
- Lifts/elevators: 99

Design and construction
- Architects: Minoru Yamasaki; Emery Roth & Sons
- Structural engineer: Leslie E. Robertson (Worthington, Skilling, Helle, and Jackson)

The original 2 World Trade Center (also known as the South Tower, Tower 2, Building Two, or 2 WTC) was one of the Twin Towers of the original World Trade Center in New York City. The tower was completed and opened in 1973 at a height of 1,362 feet (415 m) to the roof, distinguishable from its twin, the North Tower (1 World Trade Center), by the absence of a television antenna. On the 107th floor of this building was a popular tourist attraction, "Top of the World Trade Center Observatories," and on the roof was an outdoor observation deck accessible to the public and a disused helipad at the center. The WTC complex had its own ZIP Code of 10048.

The South Tower was destroyed alongside the North Tower in the September 11 attacks. At 9:03 a.m., (Note: The exact time is disputed. The 9/11 Commission report says 9:03:11, NIST reports 9:02:59, some other sources report 9:03:02.) seventeen minutes after its twin was hit, the South Tower was struck by United Airlines Flight 175. Although it was the second of the two skyscrapers to be hit by a hijacked airliner, it was the first to collapse, at 9:59 a.m., (Note: NIST and the 9/11 Commission both state that the collapse began at 9:58:59 a.m., which is rounded to 9:59 for simplicity. If the Commission's claim that the South Tower was struck at 9:03:11 is accurate, then it collapsed after 55 minutes and 48 seconds, rather than 56 minutes.) after burning for 56 minutes. Of the 2,996 people killed in the attacks, around 1,000 were in the South Tower or on the ground. At the National September 11 Memorial & Museum, the southern pool marks the spot where the South Tower stood.

== History ==
=== Development ===
In 1961, the Port Authority of New York and New Jersey agreed to build the World Trade Center on the site of the Hudson Terminal in Lower Manhattan, New York City. On September 20, 1962, the Port Authority announced the selection of Minoru Yamasaki as lead architect and Emery Roth & Sons as associate architects. Yamasaki devised the plan to incorporate twin towers. His original plan called for the towers to be 80 stories tall, but to meet the Port Authority's requirement for 10,000,000 square feet (930,000 m^{2}) of office space, the buildings would each have to be 110 stories tall. Yamasaki's design for the World Trade Center, unveiled to the public on January 18, 1964, called for a square plan approximately 207 feet (63 m) in dimension on each side.

In March 1965, the Port Authority began acquiring property at the World Trade Center site. Demolition work began on March 21, 1966, and groundbreaking for the construction of the World Trade Center took place on August 5, 1966. In January 1967, the Port Authority awarded $74 million in contracts to various steel suppliers. Construction on the South Tower was under way by January 1969. The topping out ceremony for 2 WTC (the South Tower) occurred on July 19, 1971. The South Tower began accepting tenants in January 1972, and a ribbon cutting ceremony took place on April 4, 1973.

=== Operation ===
In 1981, the Port Authority announced a $45 million plan to install sprinklers throughout the World Trade Center, following a major fire that occurred at the North Tower in 1975.

On February 26, 1993, a Ryder truck filled with 1,500 pounds (680 kg) of explosives (planted by Ramzi Yousef) detonated in the North Tower's underground garage. According to a presiding judge, the conspirators' chief aim at the time of the attack was to destabilize the North Tower and send it crashing into the South Tower, toppling both skyscrapers. Six people were killed and 1,042 others were injured in the attacks.

In February 2001, the Port Authority leased the entire World Trade Center complex to Vornado Realty Trust. However, Vornado insisted on last minute changes to the deal, and the next-highest bidder, Silverstein Properties, signed a lease for the complex on July 24, 2001.

=== Top of the World observation ===
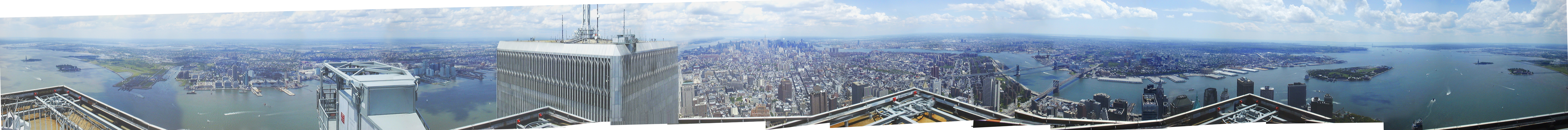
A 360° panoramic view of New York City and surrounding areas from the Top of the World observation deck, circa August 2001. North is near center and the North Tower is left.

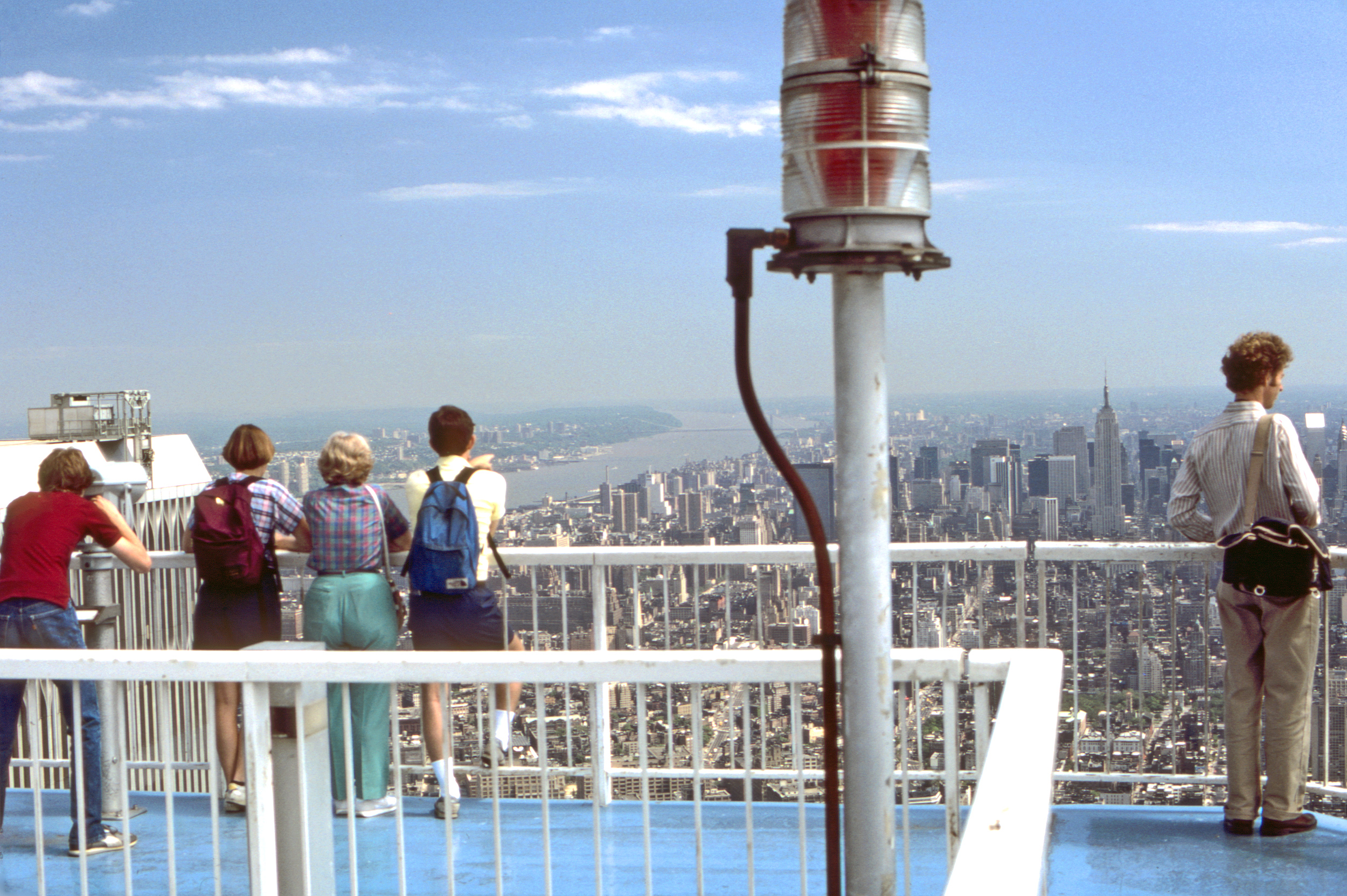
Visitors on the viewing platform on the South Tower's roof, looking north toward Midtown Manhattan in 1984

Although most of the space in the World Trade Center complex was off-limits to the public, the South Tower featured a public glass-enclosed observation deck on the 107th floor called Top of the World and an open-air deck with the height of 110 stories. The observation deck opened in December 1975 and operated from 9:30 a.m. to 11:30 p.m. (June to August) and from 9:30 a.m. to 9:30 p.m. (September to May). After paying an entrance fee in the second floor, visitors were required to pass through security checks added after the 1993 World Trade Center bombing. They were then sent to the 107th-floor indoor observatory at a height of 1,310 feet (400 m) by a dedicated express elevator, which could be only accessed by entering the core. The exterior columns were narrowed to allow 28 inches of window width between them. In 1995, the Port Authority leased operation of the observatory to Ogden Entertainment, which decided to renovate it. On April 30, 1997, the Top of the World tour reopened after renovations were finished. Dellmont Leisure Design, a La Crescenta firm led by former Disney Imagineer David Schweninger, carried out the renovations. Attractions added to the observation deck included 24 video monitors, which provided descriptions of 44 points of interest in six languages; a theater showing a film of a simulated helicopter tour around the city called "Manhattan Magic"; a model of Manhattan with 750 buildings; a Kodak photo booth and two gift shops. The 107th-floor also featured a subway-themed food court that featured Sbarro Street Station and Nathan's Famous Hot Dogs with a dining area that simulated Central Park.

Weather permitting, visitors could ride two short escalators up from the 107th-floor viewing area to an outdoor platform at a height of 1,377 ft (420 m). On a clear day, visitors could see up to 50 miles (80 km). An anti-suicide fence was placed on the roof itself, with the viewing platform set back and elevated above it, requiring only an ordinary railing. This left the view unobstructed, unlike the observation deck of the Empire State Building.

=== Destruction ===
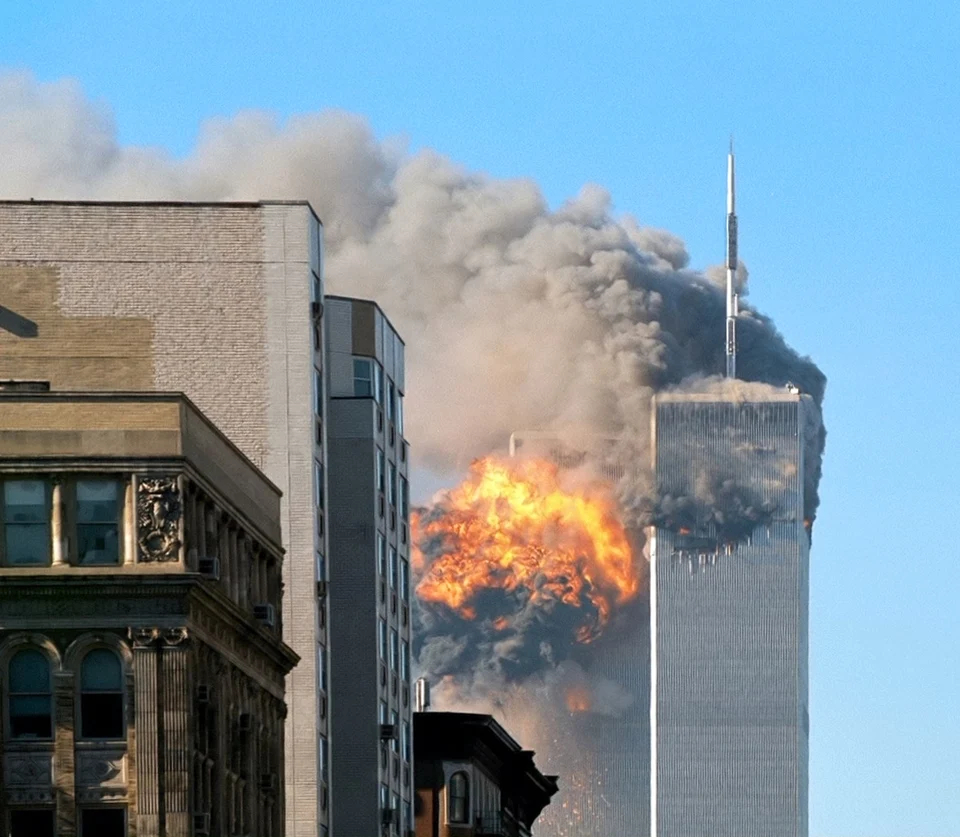
United Airlines Flight 175 hits 2 World Trade Center in the September 11 attacks.

At 9:03 a.m. EDT on September 11, 2001, five al-Qaeda terrorists crashed United Airlines Flight 175 into the southern face of the South Tower. Three buildings in the World Trade Center complex, including 2 WTC, collapsed due to fire-induced structural failure. The South Tower collapsed at 9:59 a.m. after burning for 56 minutes in the fire caused by the impact of United Airlines Flight 175 and the explosion of its fuel.

The light construction and hollow nature of the structures allowed the jet fuel to penetrate far inside the towers, igniting many large fires simultaneously over a wide area of the impacted floors. The fuel from the planes burned at most for a few minutes, but the contents of the buildings burned over the next hour to hour and a half. The fires might not have been as centrally positioned, nor as intense, had traditionally heavy high-rise construction been standing in the way of the aircraft, as debris and fuel would likely have remained mostly outside the buildings or concentrated in more peripheral areas away from the building cores, which would then not have become unique failure points. In this scenario, the towers might have stood far longer, perhaps indefinitely. The fires were hot enough to weaken the columns and cause floors to sag, pulling perimeter columns inward and reducing their ability to support the mass of the building above.

== Architecture ==
Minoru Yamasaki was the lead architect for the tower, and Emery Roth & Sons were the associate architects. During the World Trade Center's construction, the structural engineers ended up following draft versions of New York City's 1968 building codes, which incorporated "advanced techniques" in building design. The Twin Towers used a tube-frame design, which required 40 percent less structural steel than conventional building designs. The structures were inspired by the architectural ethic of Le Corbusier and was the seminal expression of Yamasaki's gothic modernist tendencies. Yamasaki was also inspired by Islamic architecture, elements of which he incorporated in the buildings' design, having previously designed Saudi Arabia's Dhahran International Airport with the Saudi Binladin Group.

When completed in 1973, the South Tower became the second tallest building in the world at 1,362 feet (415 m), behind the North Tower. Its rooftop observation deck was 1,362 ft (415 m) high and its indoor observation deck was 1,310 ft (400 m) high. Each tower stood over 1,350 feet (410 m) high, and occupied about 1 acre (4,000 m^{2}) of the total 16 acres (65,000 m^{2}) of the site's land.

=== Facade ===
The Twin Towers' facades were made of high-strength, load-bearing perimeter steel columns which acted as Vierendeel trusses. Although the columns themselves were lightweight, they were spaced closely together, forming a strong, rigid wall structure. There were 59 perimeter columns, narrowly spaced, on each side of the building. In all, the perimeter walls measured 210 feet (64 m) long on each side, and the corners were beveled. The perimeter structure was constructed of prefabricated modular pieces connected by spandrel plates. From the 7th floor to the ground level, and down to the foundation, the columns were spaced 10 feet (3.0 m) apart to accommodate doorways. All columns were placed on bedrock 65–85 feet (20–26 m) below the surface.

=== Structural features ===
The building's core housed the elevator and utility shafts, restrooms, three stairwells, and other support spaces. The core of each tower was a rectangular area 87 by 135 feet (27 by 41 m), and contained 47 steel columns running from the bedrock to the top of the tower. The South Tower's structural core was oriented with the long axis north to south. The core columns supported about half the towers' weight. All elevators were located in the core. Each building had three stairwells, also in the core, except on the mechanical floors. The large, column-free space between the perimeter and core was bridged by prefabricated floor trusses, which connected to the perimeter columns.

Hat trusses (or "outrigger truss") located from the 107th floor to the top of the North and South towers were designed to support a tall communication antenna on top of each building. The South Tower never had an antenna fitted. The framed-tube design using steel core and perimeter columns protected with sprayed-on fire resistant material created a relatively lightweight structure that would sway more in response to the wind. In designing the World Trade Center, Leslie Robertson considered the scenario of the impact of a jet airliner crashing into the building. The National Institute of Standards and Technology (NIST) found a three-page white paper that mentioned another aircraft impact analysis, involving impact of a jet at 600 mph (970 km/h), was indeed considered, but NIST could not locate the documentary evidence of the aircraft impact analysis.

Sprayed-fire resistant materials (SFRMs), gypsum wallboard, and vermiculite were used to provide fireproofing to the interiors. More fireproofing was added after a fire in February 1975, but after the 1993 bombing, inspections found fireproofing to be deficient. The 1968 New York City building codes did not require sprinklers for high-rise buildings, except for underground spaces, but the entire complex was retrofitted by 2001.

=== Electrical and communications features ===
Electrical service to the towers was supplied by Consolidated Edison at 13,800 volts. This service passed through the World Trade Center Primary Distribution Center (PDC) and sent up through the core of the building to electrical substations located on the mechanical floors. The substations stepped down the 13,800 primary voltage to 480/277 volt secondary service, and then further down to 208/120 volt general power and lighting service. The complex also was served by emergency generators located in the sub-levels of the towers and on the roof of 5 WTC.

The 110th floor of 1 World Trade Center (the North Tower) housed radio and television transmission equipment; access to the roof of 1 WTC was controlled from the WTC Operations Control Center (OCC) located in the B1 level of 2 WTC.

== Tenants ==
Note: Floor numbers in red are part of United Airlines Flight 175's impact area during the September 11 attacks, with floors above this zone marked in dark gray .

Floor #	Companies	Business
110/R	Outdoor Observatory (Top of the world)	Tourism
109	Mechanical floor	
108	Mechanical floor	
107	Showtime Pictures, Top of the World Trade Center Observatories (Indoor Observatory), Sbarro Street Station, Nathan's Famous Hot Dogs, Manhattan Magic, Kodak	Business services, Tourism, Food, Entertainment
106	Atlantic Bank of New York	Banks/Financial
105	AON Corporation	Insurance
104	AON Corporation, Sandler O'Neill and Partners	Insurance, Investments
103	AON Corporation	Insurance
102	AON Corporation	Insurance
101	AON Corporation	Insurance
100	AON Corporation	Insurance
99	AON Corporation	Insurance
98	AON Corporation	Insurance
97	Fiduciary Trust Company International	Banks/Financial
96	Fiduciary Trust Company International	Banks/Financial
95	Fiduciary Trust Company International	Banks/Financial
94	Fiduciary Trust Company International	Banks/Financial
93	AON Corporation, Regus Business Centers	Insurance, Co-working
92	AON Corporation	Insurance
91	Gibbs & Hill, Raytheon Company, Washington Group International	Engineers, Manufacturing
90	Fiduciary Trust Company International	Banks/Financial
89	Keefe, Bruyette & Woods	Investments
88	Keefe, Bruyette & Woods	Investments
87	New York State Department of Taxation and Finance, Corporation Service Company	Government, Financial
86	New York State Department of Taxation and Finance	Government
85	Harris Beach & Wilcox	Attorneys
84	Euro Brokers	Financial
83	IQ Financial Systems, Chuo Mitsui Trust & Banking	Financial
82	Fuji Bank	Banks/Financial
81	Fuji Bank	Banks/Financial
80	Fuji Bank	Banks/Financial
79	Fuji Bank	Banks/Financial
78	Skylobby, First Commercial Bank, Baseline Financial Services	Banks/Financial, Financial
77	Baseline Financial Services	Financial
76	Mechanical floor	
75	Mechanical floor	
74	Morgan Stanley	Investments
73	Morgan Stanley	Investments
72	Morgan Stanley	Investments
71	Morgan Stanley	Investments
70	Morgan Stanley	Investments
69	Morgan Stanley	Investments
68	Morgan Stanley	Investments
67	Morgan Stanley	Investments
66	Morgan Stanley	Investments
65	Morgan Stanley	Investments
64	Morgan Stanley	Investments
63	Morgan Stanley	Investments
62	Morgan Stanley, Demeter Management Corporation	Investments, Not available
61	Morgan Stanley	Investments
60	Morgan Stanley	Investments
59	Morgan Stanley	Investments
58	Bridge Information Systems	Financial Information Provider
57	Hold Brothers	Financial
56	Morgan Stanley	Investments
55	Guy Carpenter, Garban Intercapital, Harlows	Reinsurance, Investments, Not available
54	Guy Carpenter	Reinsurance
53	Guy Carpenter	Reinsurance
52	Guy Carpenter	Reinsurance
51	Guy Carpenter	Reinsurance
50	Guy Carpenter	Reinsurance
49	Guy Carpenter, Seabury & Smith	Reinsurance, Insurance
48	Fireman's Fund Insurance Company, Guy Carpenter	Insurance, Reinsurance
47	Guy Carpenter	Reinsurance
46	Morgan Stanley	Investments
45	Morgan Stanley	Investments
44	Skylobby, Morgan Stanley	Investments
43	Morgan Stanley	Investments
42	Mechanical floor	
41	Mechanical floor	
40	Sitailong International USA, Thacher Proffitt & Wood, LLP	Not available, Attorneys
39	Thacher Proffitt & Wood, LLP	Attorneys
38	Thacher Proffitt & Wood, LLP	Attorneys
37	—	—
36	Frenkel and Company	Insurance
35	Frenkel and Company	Insurance
34	OppenheimerFunds	Investments
33	OppenheimerFunds	Investments
32	OppenheimerFunds, Commerzbank Capital Markets	Investments, Financial
31	OppenheimerFunds	Investments
30	New York Stock Exchange, Hartford Steam Boiler	Financial, Insurance
29	Weatherly Securities Corporation, New York Stock Exchange	Investment, Financial
28	New York Stock Exchange, Big A Travel Agency, Law Office Of Joseph Bellard, Hua Nan Commercial Bank Ltd.	Financial, Transportation, Law Firms, Financial Institutions
27	—	—
26	Sun Microsystems	Computer services
25	Sun Microsystems	Computer services
24	Allstate Insurance Company, China Chamber of Commerce, Globe Tour and Travel, SCOR U.S. Corporation, Sinolion, TD Ameritrade	Insurance, Organizations, Travel, Insurance, Not available, Investments
23	SCOR U.S. Corporation, Unistrat Corporation of America	Insurance, Consultants
22	Antal International, Mancini Duffy, NYS Retirement System	Not available
21	Adecco SA, Career Engine, Mancini Duffy, Matthews & Wright Inc., Taiwan Sugar Corporation	Employment agency, Research, Architects, Not available
20	Thacher Proffitt & Wood, LLP, New York Shipping Association	Attorneys, Transportation
19	New York Shipping Association, Waterfront Commission of New York Harbor	Transportation, Not available
18	AbraCadabra Digital Printing, Alliance Consulting Group, Weiland International Inc.	Business Services, Not available
17	New York Institute of Finance	Banks/Financial
16	National Development and Research Institute	Research
15	Candia Shipping, Orient International (South Korean investment company, later merged with Yuanta Securities) CINDE Costa Rican Investment Board, DigiOrbit Corporation, Millennium Management Resources Inc., Optech Systems Inc., Stallion Commerce Corporation, TD Ameritrade	Not available, Investments, Not available, Banks/Financial
14	Charna Chemicals, Paging Network of New York, Patinka International (USA), Union Bank of California	Manufacturing, Telecommunication, Business services, Banks/Financial
13	Verizon Communications	Telecommunication
12	Verizon Communications	Telecommunication
11	Verizon Communications, Candia Shipping	Telecommunication, Shipping
10	Verizon Communications	Telecommunication
9	Verizon Communications	Telecommunication
8	Mechanical floor	
7	Mechanical floor	
6	—	—
5	—	—
4	—	—
3	—	—
2	—	—
L	Nichols Foundation, Colortek Kodak Imaging Center, TKTS	Government/Schools, Business services
C	The Mall at the World Trade Center	Retail
B	Xerox Document Company, Anthem, NY Chamber of Commerce	Manufacturing, Insurance, Government
NA	Continental Insurance Company	Insurance
SOURCES: CoStar Group Inc.; Skyscrapers, An Architectural Type of Modern Urbanism; compiled from AP wire reports.

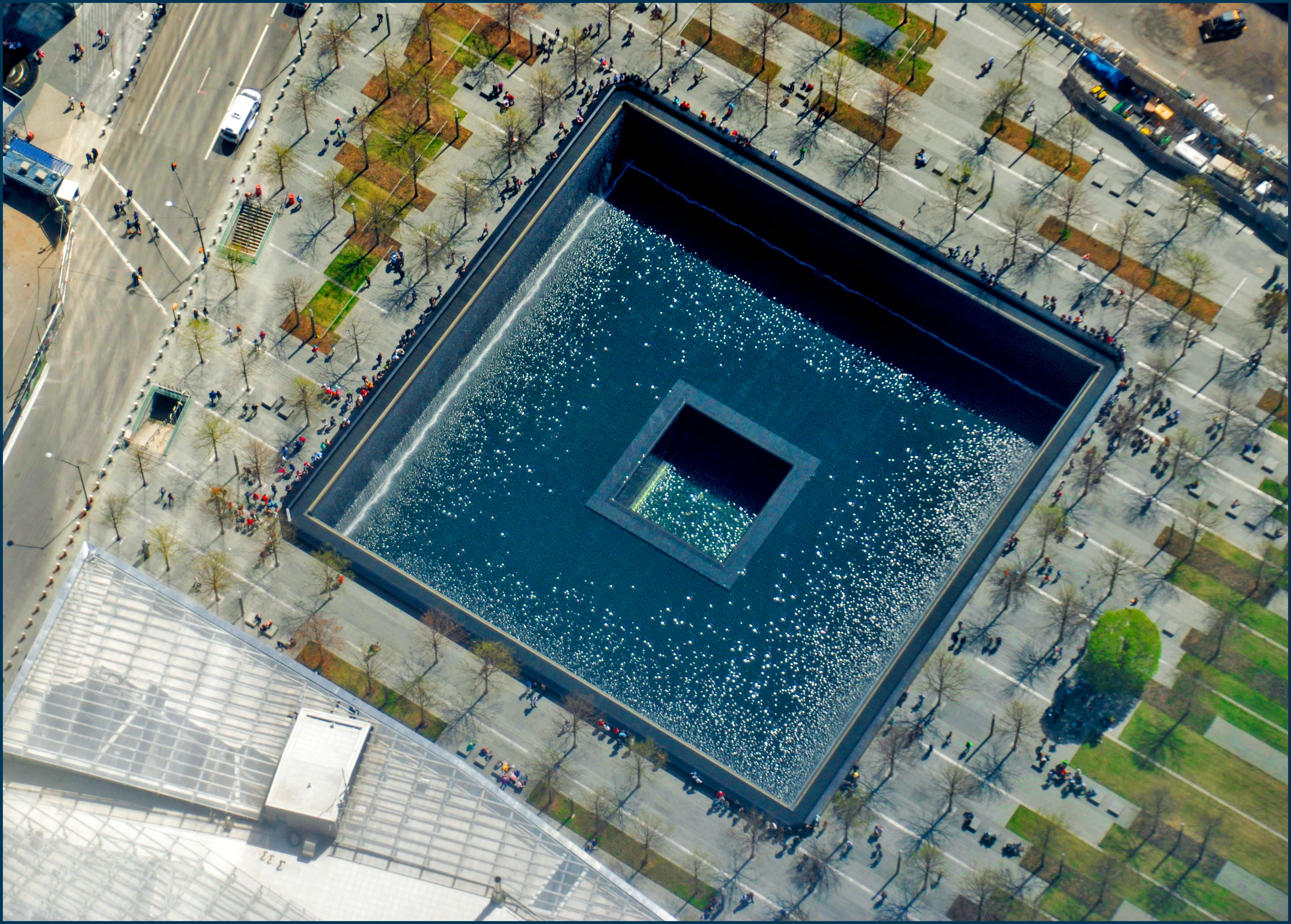
The South Pool of the present-day National September 11 Memorial & Museum, marking the spot upon which the original Two World Trade Center stood

NOTE: Atlantic Bank of New York had moved out in July 2001, but they were still paying for the rent as of September 2001.
