= Georgios Stavros =

Greek banker and philanthropist

- Γεώργιος Σταύρος
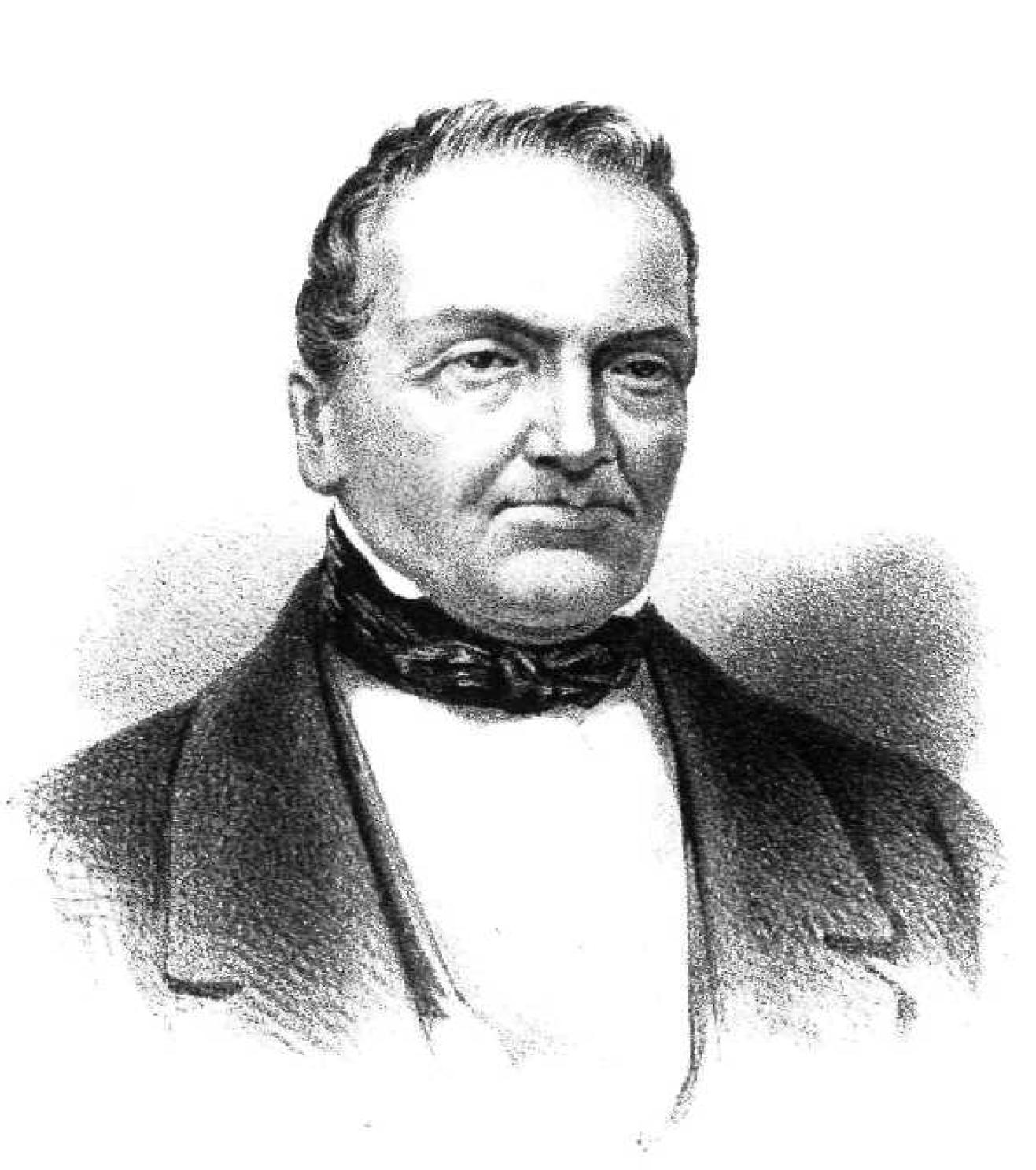
- Drawing of Georgios Stavros
- Born: 1788; Ioannina, Ottoman Empire (modern Greece)
- Died: 1869 (aged 80–81); Athens, Greece
- Education: Balanaia, Kaplaneios, Vienna Commercial School
- Occupation: Businessman
- Known for: Banker; Benefactor; Revolutionary

Georgios Stavros (Greek: Γεώργιος Σταύρος, 1788–1869) was a banker, benefactor and revolutionary from modern-day Greece. He was one of the founders and the first governor of the National Bank of Greece.

== Early years ==
Stavros was of Aromanian origin, born in Ioannina, Epirus, a major intellectual center of the Greek world then under Ottoman rule. He studied in renowned schools of his home town, such as the Balaneios and then the Kaplaneios, under Athanasios Psalidas. Stavros, later moved to Vienna in order to take over the commercial business of his father, while studying at the local business school.

Because of his profession he had to travel to various European cities. In Saint Petersburg, he met Ioannis Kapodistrias, that time a diplomat in the service of the Russian Empire, that would play a key role in the Greek politics the following years. Stavros soon became a member of the patriotic organization Filiki Eteria.

== Greek War of Independence ==
Shortly after the outbreak of the Greek War of Independence (1821) he supported the uprising by supplying the revolutionaries with firearms, ammunition and food. In 1824 Stavros moved to Greece and the next year he was appointed Chief Cashier of the Executive body of the First Hellenic Republic, under Georgios Kountouriotis. Apart from his financial duties, he joined the armed struggle against the Ottoman Empire by leading an infantry group against Ibrahim Pasha of Egypt. He held the rank of Chiliarchos and was in charge of 50 men in central Greece, in order to support the defenders of Missolonghi during its Third Siege. Stavros participated in the Third National Assembly at Troezen (1827) as representative of the regions of Epirus and Central Greece, as well as in the Fifth National Assembly at Nafplion (1831), as representative of Epirus.

== After Independence and restoration of the Greek economy ==
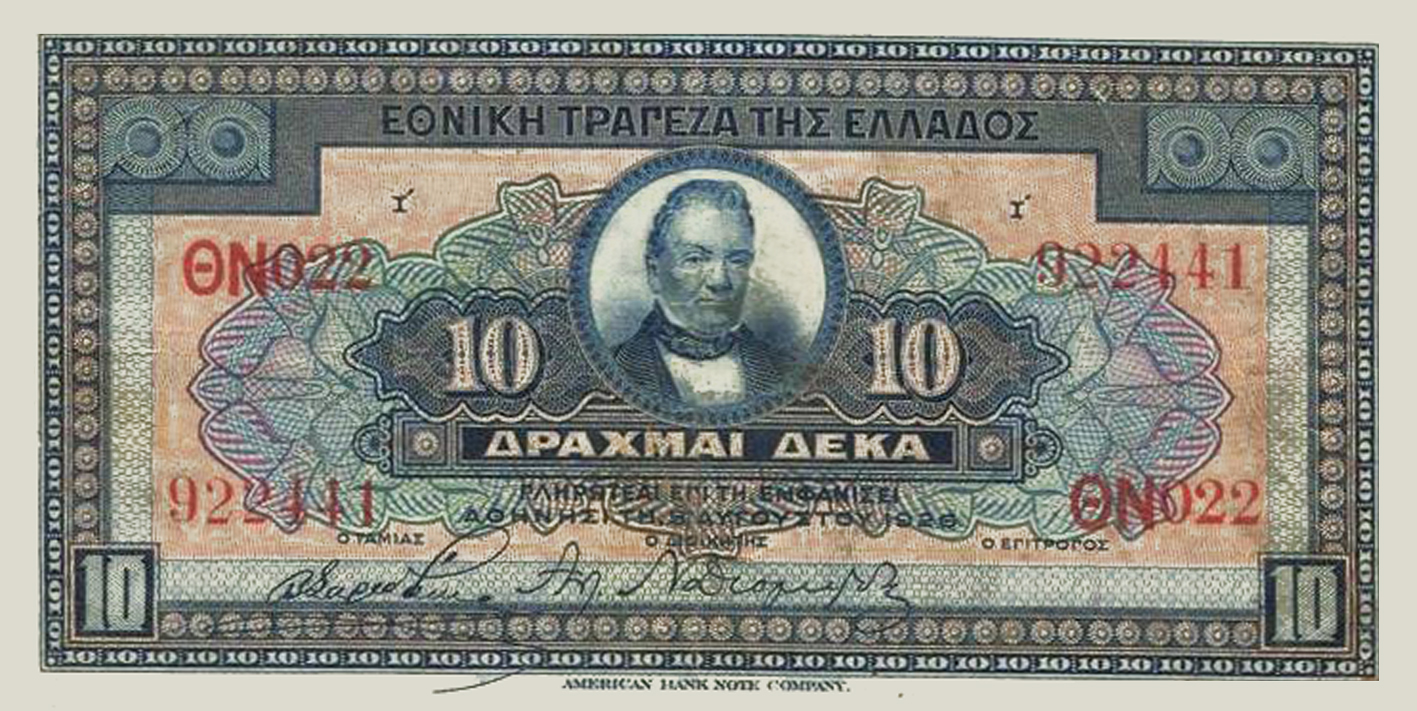
Georgios Stavros on the 1926 Greek 10 drachma banknote

During Kapodistrias' premiership (1828–1831), he participated in the three-member Economic Committee that was responsible for the operation of the first state bank of Greece, the National Financial Bank (Greek: Εθνική Χρηματιστική Τράπεζα), which issued money, the Phoenix, and securities.

After the assassination of Kapodistrias, Greece came under the rule of King Otto. During this period Stavros, became a key figure in the establishment of the National Bank of Greece and was its first governor, elected in 1842. The National Bank of Greece was the sole institution that would issue banknotes in Greece (Drachmas) for the next 87 years. Until his death, Stavros laid the foundations for the organization and expansion of the Bank, due to experience gained from his business in Vienna as well as the guidance offered by the Swiss banker, Jean-Gabriel Eynard. Stavros remained in this post until his death in 1869.

At his own expense, Stavros established an orphanage in his home town of Ioannina. His portrait is displayed on various pre-1932 Greek banknotes.
