= Angelos Kitsos =

- Born: 1934; Corfu, Greece
- Died: 6 August 2008 (aged 73–74); Athens, Greece
- Known for: Presidency of Rizarios Foundation, I.A.O.A., several books and films

Angelos Kitsos (Greek: Άγγελος Κίτσος; 1934 – 6 August 2008) was the president of Rizarios Foundation (Ριζάρειο Ίδρυμα).He was a Greek from Monodendri, Zagori. He was member of the Councils of the Foundation for the Restoration of Greeks from Albania (Ίδρυμα Αποκαταστάσεως Ομογενών εξ Αλβανίας, I.A.O.A.) and the Foundation of Research of the Ionian and Adriatic space. He was a towering figure for Zagori and the rest of Epirus and Western Greece. Kitsos was a lawyer, but he also worked on script-writing for a number of documentaries, and wrote a number of books.

== Early life ==
He was born in Corfu, Greece. His father was Athanasios Kitsos and also was a lawyer. Angelos went to the historical Kaplaneios School for primary education till 1945, that he entered the (also historical for Ioannina) Zosimaia School. His classmate during primary and secondary, Christos Makris, says: "The entire class was depending on him![...] While we read "Thesaurus", "Romance" and the "Mask", he read Dostoevsky, Tolstoy, Hemingway, Rousseau, Voltaire, Nitsche...'" Angelos studied law, at the Law School of Athens.

== Career ==
In 1960, he was employed in the National Foundation (Εθνικό Ίδρυμα), where in 1961 he was given responsibility of the Sector of Programme of Communal Development. In 1971, he was elected as lifelong member of the Council of the Rizarios Foundation. In 1974, he became Director of Cultural Programmes in the National Foundation. More specifically, in the National Foundation, he worked mainly on the programmes of local development of Thessaloniki, Chalcidice and Eurytania.

== Co-operations for development ==
Kitsos co-operated with the American Agricultural School, the Bureau of Social Affairs of the United Nations, the EOEX, the CARE Organisation, the National Centre, the Greek Ministry of Internal Affairs, the Greek Ministry of Agriculture, the Greek Ministry of Education, the Centre of Constant Training of Public Servants. E.R.A. (Ελληνική Ραδιοφωνία), the state radio station, often consulted Angelos's large disc library, that already numbered over 9000 discs in the 70s.

In co-operation with the "Stavros S. Niarchos" foundation and the University of Athens, Angelos managed to build the Social Hospice, the International Centre of Culture and Tradition and the Unit of Natural Medicine. He also co-operated with the director group of Roberus Manthoulis, Photis Mesthenaios, Hercules Papadakis and as executive producer and script-writer produced, on the account of the National Foundation a number of films and documentaries. He also co-operated with Kostas Fronzos to build the 1st Student Hospice and with Froso Ioannidi to build the Pupil Hospice of Tsepelovo. In the Foundation for Restoration of Greeks from Albania, he built the Centre of Professional Training of Pogoniani, a move characterised by The Wall Street Journal as " major lesson of diplomacy in the Balkans".

== Activities in the Rizarios Foundation ==
Angelos Kitsos has connected his name with all attempts of development of the wealth of Rizarios foundation in favor of Epirus. He was the main negotiator with the Karamanlis government (1979) for the exchange of an area in Vassilisis Sofias Avenue in Athens, for the Ionian School, 17.000m^{2} in the Delta of Phalero and equal area in Ioannina, including the Agricultural Boarding School. Also, in co-operation with Stathi Lampridi, Yanni Sarali and Thanasi Liouma, he managed that 30% of the annual income of Rizarios Foundation went in favor of Zagori. As president of the foundation, Kitsos was the instigator of building the Rizarios Handcraft Centre, the Rizarios Exhibition Centre, the Open-Air Theatre and Sports Stadium of Monodendri, the first of which is to be named after him. In co-operation with the Latsis Group and the "Stavros S.Niarchos" foundation, Angelos Kitsos brought to Monodendri a number of rare exhibitions, some of which were opened by the President of the Hellenic Republic himself.

== His works ==
=== Films and Documentaries ===
- The greatest power (Η πιο μεγάλη δύναμη) (1st award of short length movie, Thessaloniki Festival,1962)
- The first step (Το πρώτο βήμα) (1st award of cinema critics for short length movie, Thessaloniki Festival,1963)
- The agricultural housekeeping (Το αγροτικό νοικοκυριό)
- Green gold (Πράσινο χρυσάφι)
- Organisation and management of agricultural exploits (Οργάνωση και διαχείριση γεωργικών εκμεταλλεύσεων)

=== Books and publications ===
Programme of Tourist Development of Thessaloniki(NEKA, 1961)
Tourism and Social Development(EOT,1971)
Communication and Discussion
Meaning, significance and evolution of the educational cinema - The educational documentary in Greece
Popular training and Communal Development
The meaning of compromise in Communal Development and the peaceful resolution of issues
Programme of local development in post-war Greece
The Greek contribution in the new perspective of Albania

=== Exhibitions ===
Images of Greece 1903-1930 by Fred Boissonas
Russia 100 years
The villages of Zagori
Life of Zagorisians 1860-1960
Ioannina 1860-1960
Greece 1896-1906
Greece of the hard work 1900-1960, Collection of Nikos Politis
The Architecture of Central Zagori
A Greek Portfolio by Constantine Manos
Following the accidental by Willy Ronis
