= Bank of Crete (1899–1919) =

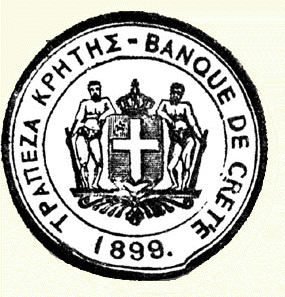
Bank of Crete seal

The Bank of Crete (Greek: Τράπεζα Κρήτης, French: Banque de Crète) was a bank that functioned between 1899 and 1918.

== History ==
Following the departure of the Ottoman Empire's forces in December 1898, the government of the autonomous Cretan State, under Eleftherios Venizelos, established the Bank of Crete (Banque de Crète) with the assistance of the National Bank of Greece and Hambros Brothers on 30 September 1899. In addition to the functions of commercial and mortgage banking, the bank received the exclusive privilege, for thirty years, of issuing banknotes in the island of Crete. The National Bank of Greece wholly acquired, and subsumed the Bank of Crete in 1919.

== See also ==
- Privileged Bank of Epirothessaly
- List of banks in Greece
