= Atlantic Bank of New York =

Bank holding company

- Type: Subsidiary of New York Community Bank
- Industry: Financial services
- Founded: 1926; 100 years ago

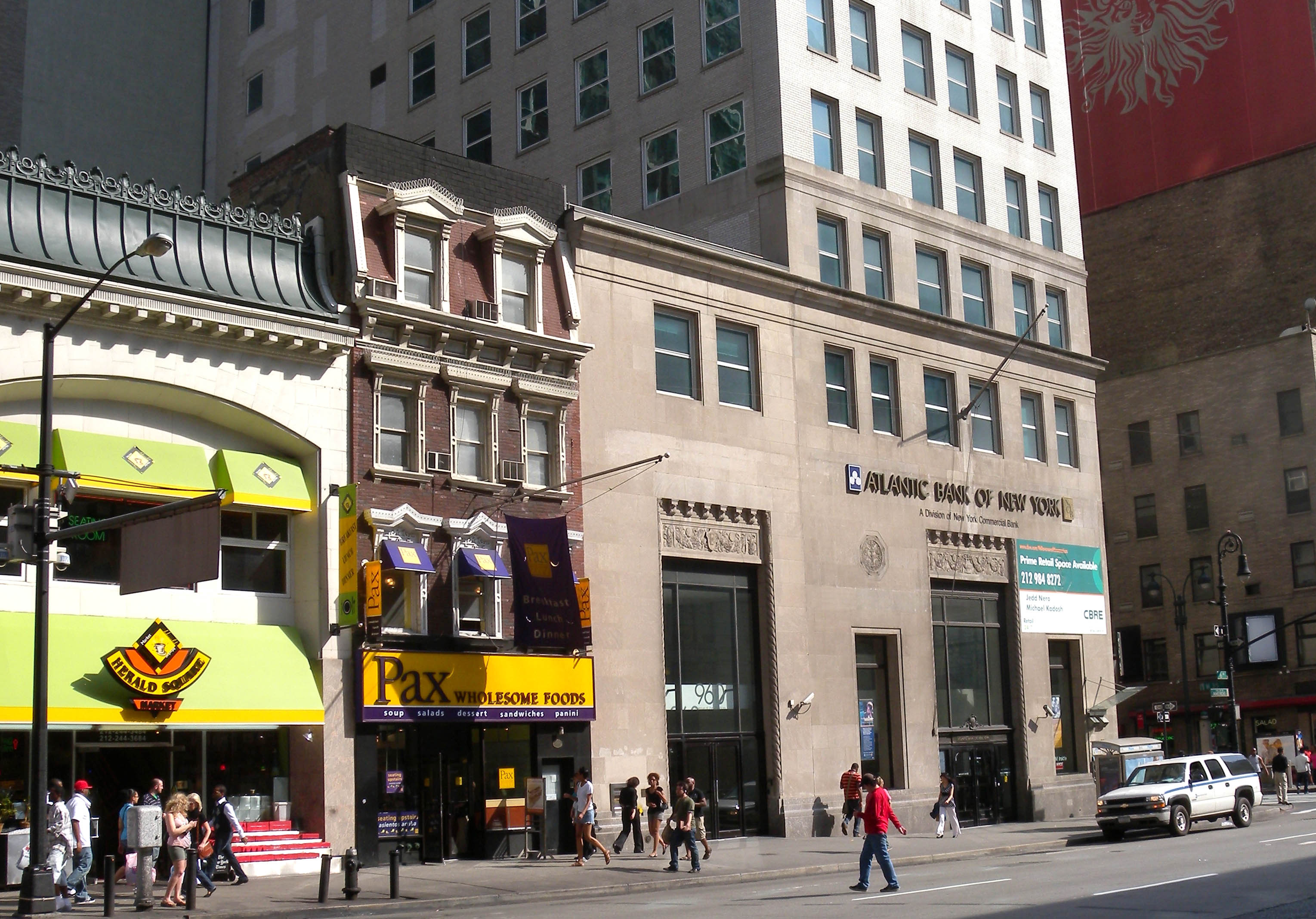
6th Avenue, Manhattan

Atlantic Bank of New York is a bank holding company and a subsidiary of New York Community Bank.

== History ==
In 1926, Bank of Athens Trust Company, a subsidiary of Bank of Athens, received a bank charter in New York State.

In 1952, the bank changed its name to Atlantic Bank of New York.

In 1953, the bank acquired Hellenic Bank Trust Company.

In 1959, the bank acquired Bankatlanta Safe Deposit Company.

In 2002, the bank acquired Yonkers S&L.

Prior to the September 11 attacks, Atlantic Bank of New York had offices on the 106th floor of the World Trade Center's South Tower; the bank had been renting the space for the previous 18 months while their Midtown Manhattan headquarters was being renovated. Their lease expired the week before the attacks, and although they were listed as a tenant by media outlets, the floor was empty when the attacks began and no employees were harmed.

In 2006, the bank was acquired by New York Community Bank for $400 million. and Mr. Spiros J. Voutsinas appointed President of Atlantic Bank.

In 2014, Spiros J. Voutsinas, the president & chief executive officer of the bank, died. In July, Nancy Papaioannou was elected President of Atlantic Bank of New York, division of New York Commercial Bank.
