= Bank of Athens =

Former Greek bank

Former head office on 38 Stadiou Street in Athens

The Bank of Athens (Greek: Τράπεζα Αθηνών, French: Banque d'Athènes), colloquially known as Athinaiki, was a Greek bank based in Athens, Greece, from where it took its name. Founded in 1893 and long affiliated with France's Banque de l'Union Parisienne (BUP), it was Greece's second-largest bank in the mid-20th century behind the National Bank of Greece (NBG). It expanded in the Balkans and Eastern Mediterranean until merging with the NBG in 1953. Its brand was briefly revived in Greece during the 1990s, and separately survived until 2019 in a former South African subsidiary.

== Overview ==
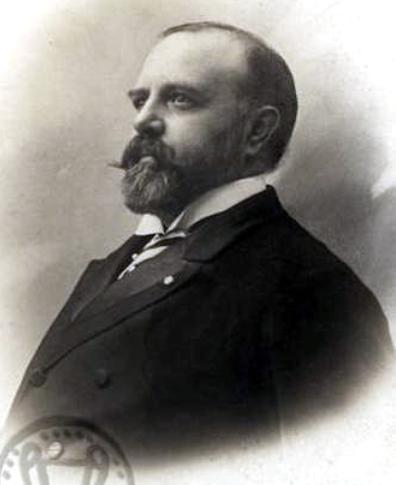
Ioannis Pesmazoglou (1857-1906) was the architect of the alliance between the Bank of Athens and France's Banque de l'Union Parisienne

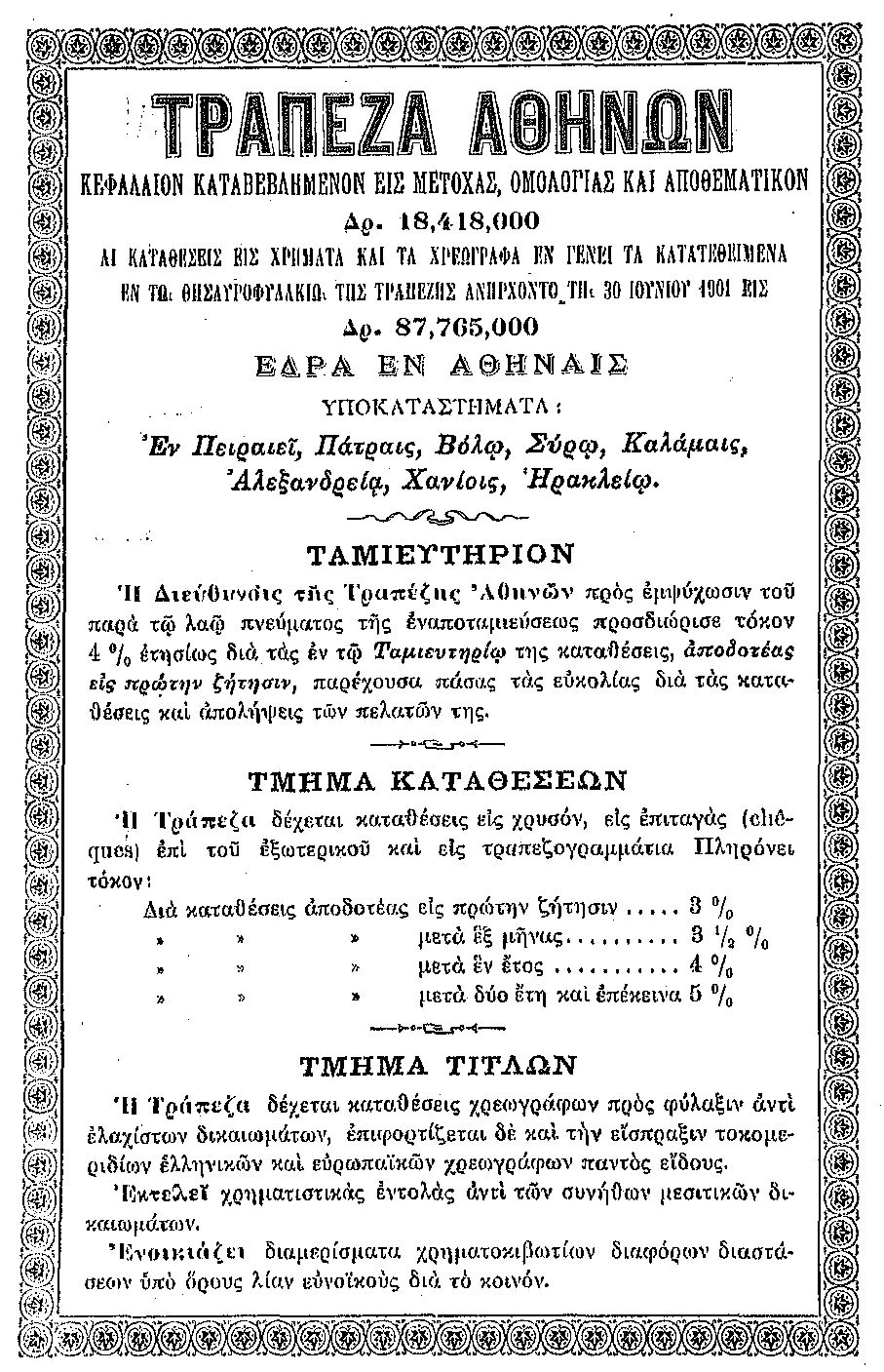
Advert of the Bank of Athens, 1902

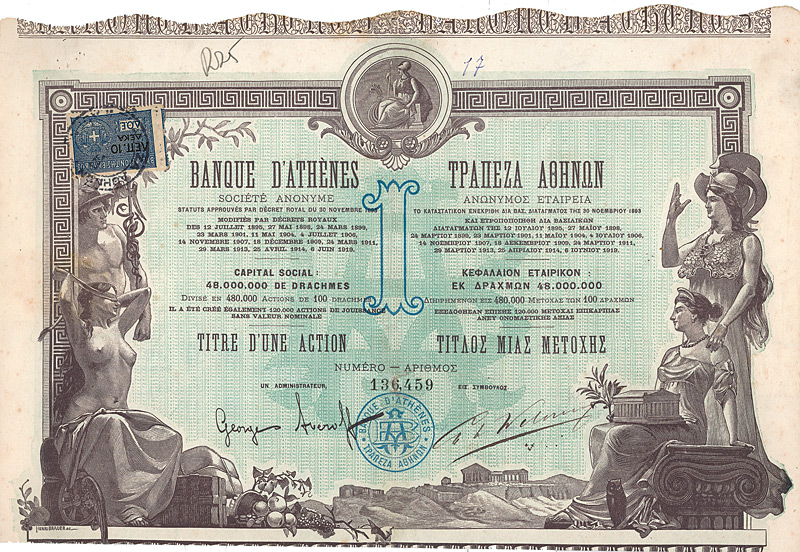
Share of the Bank of Athens, 1919

In 1893, Epaminondas Empirikos, A. Lambrinoudis, A. Kallergis, M. Lordanopoulos, and N. Triantafyllidis founded the Bank of Athens backed by Greek, French, and English capital. The bank opened for business in 1894. In 1895, it established branches in London, Constantinople, Smyrna, and Khartoum.

In 1896 international financier Ioannis Pesmazoglou sold his private bank to the Bank of Athens and became the latter's chairman, also providing the bank with a branch in Alexandria. In 1904, he forged an alliance with the Banque de l'Union Parisienne, under which the BUP became a small shareholder of the Bank of Athens and became its main source of international refinancing.

In August 1906, the Bank of Athens purchased the Industrial Credit Bank (Greek: Τράπεζα Επαγγελματικής Πίστεως, French: Banque de Crédit Industriel de Grèce),, which had operated in Athens since 1873. The Industrial Credit Bank had offices in Istanbul and possibly in Smyrna. By 1910, the Bank of Athens had opened branches in Crete (Chania, Heraklion, and Rethymno), and in Trabzon and Samsun on the Black Sea Region of Turkey. By 1911, it also had branches in Greece in Agrinio, Kalamata, Karditsa, Larissa, Piraeus, Tripoli, Volos, and Ermoupoli on the island of Syros; in the European part of the Ottoman Empire in Ioannina, Kavala, Salonica, Serres, Xanthi, and on the island of Chios and Vathy, Samos; in Ottoman Asia in Adana, Giresun, Mersin and Tarsus; in Egypt in Alexandria, Cairo, Beni Suef, Mansoura, Mit Ghamr, Tanta, Zagazig, as well as Port Sudan; and in Limassol and Hamburg. It survived financial stress during the Balkan Wars with support from the BUP and the NBG, following which French operational control intensified.

In 1921, the Bank of Athens opened an office in New York City. By 1922, the bank had branches throughout Greece, in Limassol and Nicosia, Alexandria, Cairo, Port Said, Galata, Stamboul, Beyoğlu, Edirne, London and Manchester. Despite losing its offices in Constantinople, Edirne and Smyrna in October 1922 following the Greco-Turkish War, the Bank of Athens was by then the second-largest in Greece, a position it kept until its merger in 1953 despite the difficulties generated by the European banking crisis of 1931 which led the BUP in France to near-collapse.

In 1926, the bank's New York City office became a subsidiary called the "Bank of Athens Trust Company". In 1930, the NBG and the Bank of Athens combined their activities in Egypt to form a subsidiary, the National Bank of Greece and Athens (French: Banque Nationale de Grèce et d'Athènes). By the 1930s, the Bank of Athens also had offices in Korçë and Durrës. Throughout the interwar period, the Bank of Athens was widely viewed as aligned with French interests in Greece, whereas its dominant competitor the National Bank of Greece was perceived as representing British capital not least through its longstanding association with London-based Hambros Bank.

In 1941, during the Axis Occupation of Greece, Dresdner Bank assumed oversight of the bank, which entailed operational control even though it did not technically take over its shares out of consideration for Italian sensitivities.

In 1953, the Greek government decided to merge the comparatively sounder Bank of Athens with the then-ailing NBG to form the "National Bank of Greece and Athens". In New York City, the two banks merged their subsidiaries into the Atlantic Bank of New York. In 1956, the merged entity in Greece again took the name of National Bank of Greece.

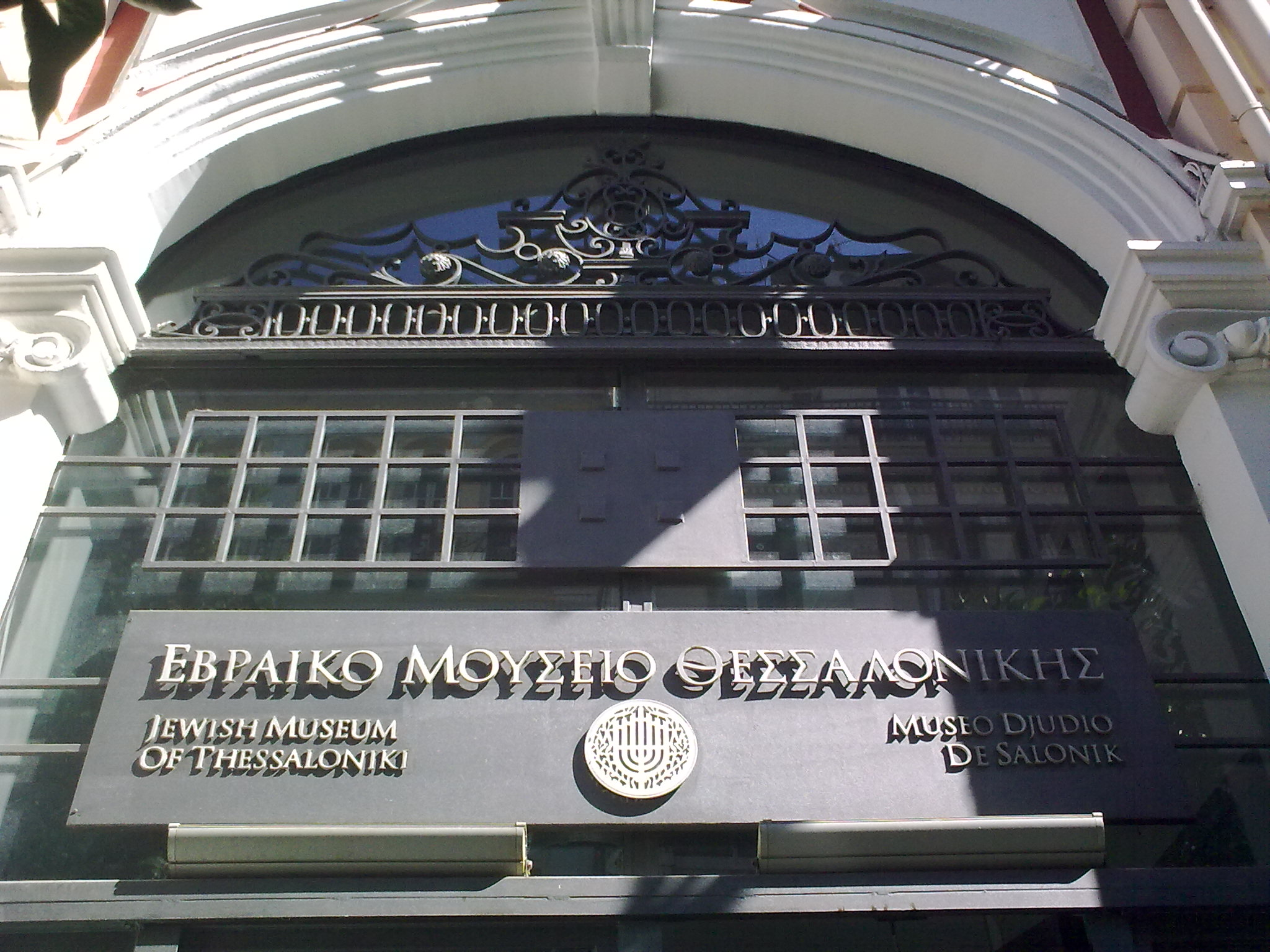
Entrance to the bank's former Salonica branch, repurposed as Jewish Museum of Thessaloniki

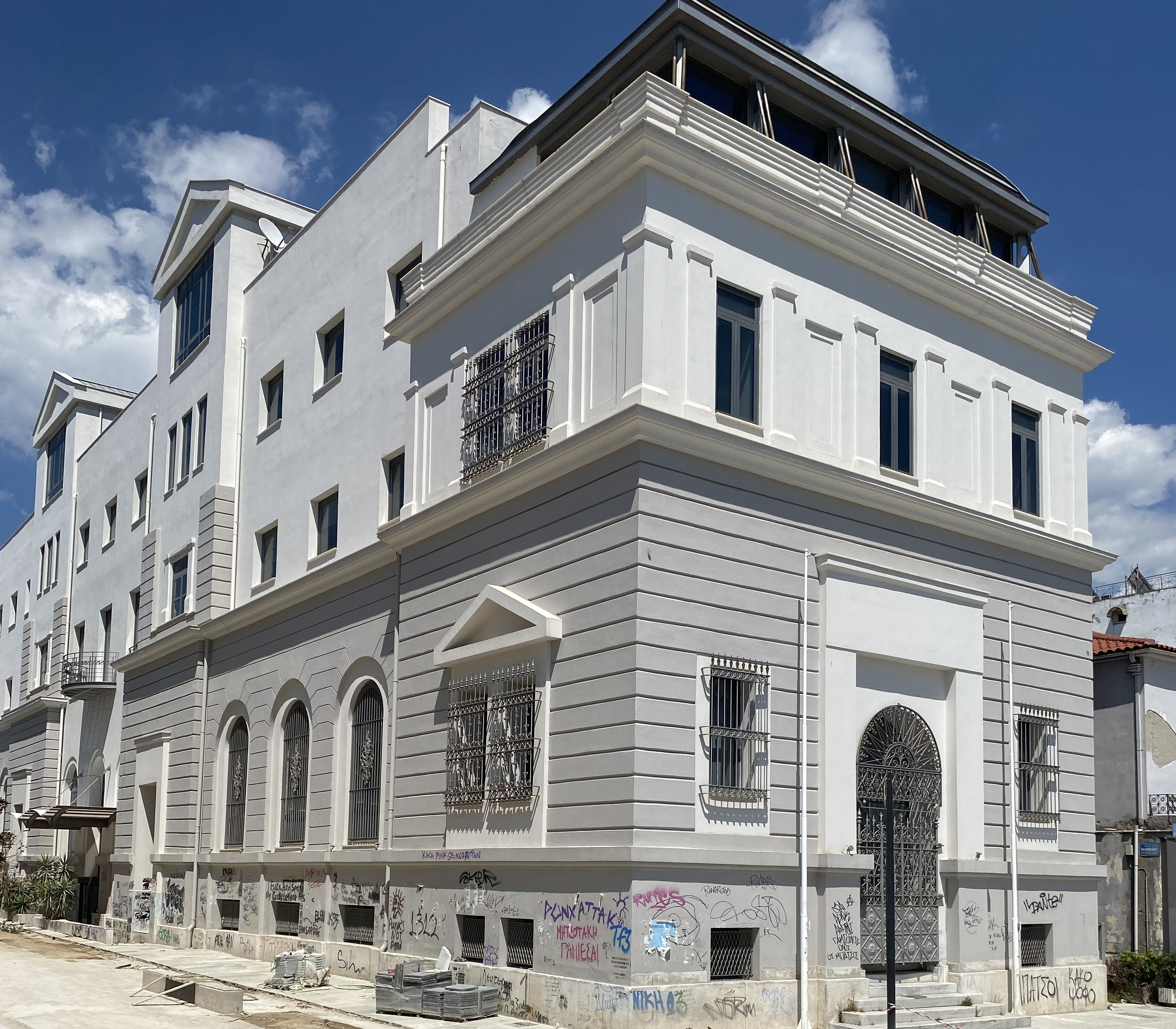
Former branch building in Volos, remodeled and repurposed as library of the University of Thessaly

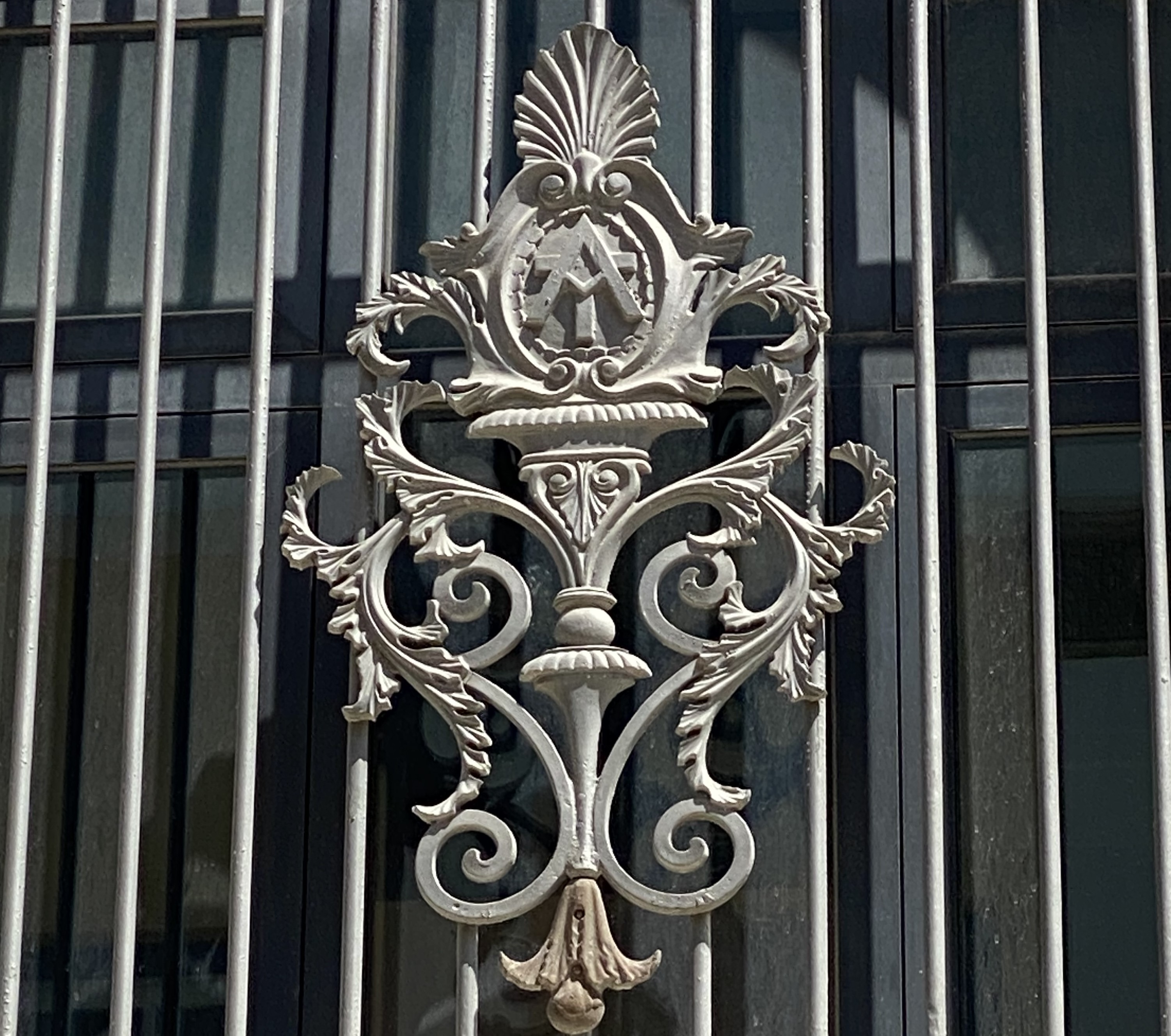
Monogram of the bank ("TA" for Τράπεζα Αθηνών) at the former Volos branch

== 1990s brand revival and integration into Eurobank Ergasias ==
In 1964, the NBG acquired a majority stake in a bank originally founded in 1924 as V. Karavasilis Tobacco Company and Bank SA and renamed in 1952 as Professional Credit Bank (Greek: Τράπεζα Επαγγελματικής Πίστεως). In 1992, NBG renamed the Professional Credit Bank "Bank of Athens" and sold a controlling interest to South Korea's Hanwha Group. The latter, however, experienced difficulty following the 1997 Asian financial crisis and subsequently sold its Greek banking operation to EFG Eurobank in 1999. In 2000, the Bank of Athens was fully integrated into the new group which took the name Eurobank Ergasias.

== South African Bank of Athens ==
In 1947, the Bank of Athens created a subsidiary to serve the community of Greeks in South Africa. Following the 1953 merger, the South African operation kept the Bank of Athens brand and remained under NBG ownership until being sold in October 2018 to Grobank Limited, a financial group based in Johannesburg. Grobank discontinued the Bank of Athens brand in June 2019, and was in turn acquired by Nigeria-based Access Bank Group in 2021. As a consequence, the former Bank of Athens became part of Access Bank South Africa.

== See also ==
- List of banks in Greece
