= Orfeas Georgiou =

Greek lawyer and politician (born 1994)

President of Youth Organisation of New Democracy
- In office June 4, 2022
- Vice President: Panagiotis Lebesis; Giannis Fytopoulos
- Preceded by: Pavlos Marinakis

Personal details
- Born: November 16, 1994 (age 31) Athens, Greece
- Party: New Democracy
- Education: Democritus University of Thrace; University of Piraeus
- Occupation: Lawyer
- Website: onned.gr

Orfeas Georgiou (born 16 November 1994, Athens) is a Greek lawyer and politician affiliated with the New Democracy. He is serving as president of the Youth Organisation of New Democracy (ONNED) since June 2022.

== Early life and career ==
Georgiou was born in November 1994 and raised in Athens, Greece, with family origins from Alexandroupolis. After graduating from Leontios School of Athens, he began his studies in 2012 at the Faculty of Law of the Democritus University of Thrace, from which he received a law degree (LLB) in 2018. Since then, he has been practicing law in Athens, specializing in criminal law and legal issues concerning financial transactions. He also holds a master's degree (MSc) in Law and Economics from the University of Piraeus.

=== Political career ===
At the 13th Ordinary Congress of ONNED in June 2022, Georgiou was elected president of the organization with 88.6% of the delegates’ votes, succeeding Pavlos Marinakis, who later became Deputy Minister to the Prime Minister of Greece.
