= Gikas Hardouvelis =

Greek banker and politician

Gikas A. Hardouvelis
- Γκίκας A. Χαρδούβελης
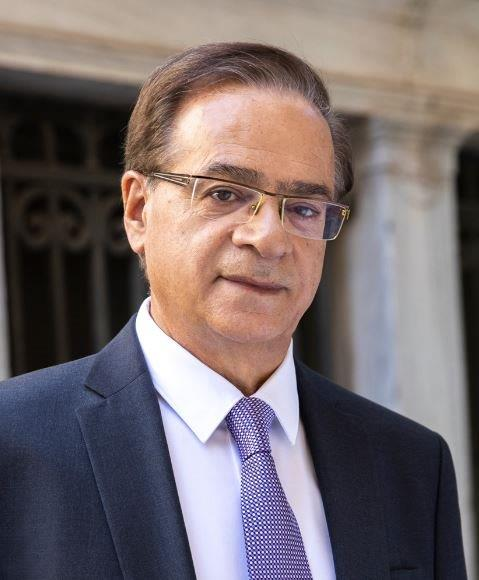

Chairman of the Board of Directors of the National Bank of Greece
- Incumbent
- Assumed office 30 July 2021
- Preceded by: Konstantinos Michailidis

Minister of Finance
- In office 10 June 2014 – 27 January 2015
- Prime Minister: Antonis Samaras
- Preceded by: Yannis Stournaras
- Succeeded by: Yanis Varoufakis

Personal details
- Born: 8 October 1955 (age 70) Poulithra, Greece
- Party: Independent
- Education: Harvard University (BS, MS); University of California, Berkeley (PhD)

Gikas A. Hardouvelis (Greek: Γκίκας A. Χαρδούβελης, born October 8, 1955) is a Greek economist and former senior government official serving as chairman of the Board of Directors of the National Bank of Greece (NBG). He was the Minister of Finance of the Hellenic Republic from June 2014 to January 2015.

Hardouvelis is professor of Finance and Economics in the Department of Banking and Financial Management of the University of Piraeus.

Hardouvelis has a lengthy and broad career in four separate areas: Academia in the United States and Greece, central banking at the Federal Reserve Bank of New York and the Bank of Greece, banking in two Greek systemic banks, and government, having worked closely as an expert technocrat with three different prime ministers from across the political spectrum.

Currently he is also active in several non-profit organizations in Greece. He is the President of MIET, a Greek cultural foundation for the support of the humanities, fine arts, and sciences. He is a Trustee of Anatolia College, a non-profit primary, secondary and tertiary private educational institution. He is also the First Vice Chairman of the board of directors and member of the executive committee of the Foundation for Economic & Industrial Research, a non-profit research institute.

== Career in banking ==
Gikas A. Hardouvelis was elected chair of the Board of Directors of the National Bank of Greece (NBG) by its board members in July 2021. In the previous two years, he was already a member of the Board of NBG, serving as the Senior Independent Director.

He initially joined NBG in 1996 as the Director of Strategic Planning & Research and Group Chief Economist. He also headed and expanded the Bank's Risk Management Division and created both the Assets-Liabilities Management as well as the Investor Relations departments. In 2005, he joined EFG Eurobank Ergasias as the Chief Economist of the group and the Head of Economic Research, and later became a Member of the executive committee.

Hardouvelis has played a critical role in the establishment of the Athens Derivatives Exchange (presently merged with the Athens Stock Exchange) as a founding member of its board of directors (1997-2000). He was also a member of Board of Directors of National Securities, S.A. from 1995 to 2000.

== Career in central banking ==
Hardouvelis has worked at the Federal Reserve Bank of New York as an Economist, Senior Economist and then Academic Adviser (1987 – 1993). His NY Fed research on margin requirements, and on the yield curve's ability to predict economic activity had a major impact in academia and in policy decisions.

He joined the Bank of Greece (the Greek central bank) in 1994–1995, as an Adviser and Alternate of the Governor at the European Monetary Institute (the precursor to the ECB). At the Bank of Greece, he actively participated in the decisions on the formation of the rules that govern the ECB architecture, plus on the rules that would allow EU countries to become member of the Euro Area.

== Active participation in government: Minister of Finance ==
Hardouvelis’ government activity in Greece spans across the political spectrum as he was called by Prime Ministers originating from different political parties to serve as an expert technocrat.

In June 2014, he was appointed Minister of Finance of the Hellenic Republic by Prime Minister Antonis Samaras, who headed a coalition government of the leading center-right New Democracy party together with the center-left PASOK.

Hardouvelis’ time in office as Finance Minister marked the beginning of an economic turnaround, immediately following a six-year deep economic crisis. The economy began growing again with economic sentiment improving, Foreign Direct Investment picking up and unemployment declining. Hardouvelis negotiated the almost closure of the 2nd Economic Adjustment Program and the country's exit from the tight surveillance by its official lenders, the so-called “Troika” (the International Monetary Fund, the European Commission and the European Central Bank). Aspects of the negotiation are popularly known as the “Hardouvelis e-mail.” After his departure in early 2015, when a new government came to power and flirted with Grexit, growth stalled and turned negative.

During his term in office, Hardouvelis also enacted legislation for the establishment of DTC (Deferred Tax Credit), which counts as regulatory capital by SSM, the European bank supervisor. DTC was substantial in magnitude and shielded Greek banks from yet another forced recapitalization. As of June 2022, DTC continues to be approximately 63% of the total regulatory capital of Greek systemic banks.

== Director of the Economic Office of the Prime Minister ==
Prior to being Minister of Finance, Hardouvelis had already served previous governments twice. This was from the position of the Director of the Economic Affairs Office of the Prime Minister of the Hellenic Republic. The first time was from May 2000 to March 2004, when he served under Prime Minister Costas Simitis and the government of PASOK.

The second time as Director of the Economic Affairs Office of the Prime Minister of the Hellenic Republic took place during the Greek economic crisis from November 2011 to May 2012, when he served under Prime Minister Lucas Papademos, who was also a technocrat and headed a coalition government. Hardouvelis was involved in the negotiations with bondholders about a partial write-down of public debt (the so-called Private Sector Involvement or PSI) and the subsequent bank recapitalization framework, as well as in the negotiations with the country's official lenders to design the second economic adjustment program for the period 2012–2014.

== Academic career and research ==
Hardouvelis is a Full Professor of Finance and Economics in the Department of Banking and Financial Management of the University of Piraeus in Greece since 1994. Earlier, he was in the United States. From 1989 to 1993 he was Associate Professor and then Full Professor of Finance at the Business School of Rutgers University in New Brunswick. Prior to Rutgers University, he was assistant professor of economics at Barnard College, Columbia University in New York City (1983–1989).

His academic research extends in the fields of Finance and Macroeconomics and is published in many internationally renowned journals, including the American Economic Review, the Journal of Finance, the Quarterly Journal of Economics, the Journal of Monetary Economics, the Review of Financial Studies, The Journal of Money, Credit and Banking, the Review of Economics and Statistics, the Journal of Business, and others.

He was included in the Hall of Fame of the top-50 referenced authors worldwide in applied econometrics over the period 1989 to 1995.

== The yield curve and future economic activity ==
Hardouvelis’ academic research at the New York Fed on the predictive ability of the yield curve for future economic activity is pioneering. It is still widely followed by academics and market participants. Specifically, in 1988–89, together with Arturo Estrella he showed a clear connection between the financial sector and the real sector of the US economy. They developed a (probit) model of the probability of a future recession. Since then, the model has correctly forecasted the subsequent U.S. recessions in real time with a lead time of about one year and no false positives.

== Margin requirements matter ==
In 1988, following the stock market crash of October 1987, Hardouvelis published an influential study concluding that in periods of high stock market margin requirements and in periods when margin requirements increase, excess volatility is low and deviations from fundamentals tend to subside. This work generated active discussion and a debate among academics and market practitioners and between the various US Exchanges. It influenced the reform of the legal framework governing the markets of futures on stock indices in the US.

== The correct euro/drachma exchange rate ==
In January 1998, Hardouvelis co-authored with Dimitris Malliaropulos a study on the correct exchange rate between the domestic currency, the drachma, and the soon to be created Euro Area currency, the euro. This took place a few months before Greece joined the ERM2 and before the drachma exchange rate was locked to the euro. The study concluded that the Greek drachma was not overvalued relative to its long-term equilibrium value. This finding was in sharp contrast with the prevailing view of market analysts, economists, and policy makers. The study was both influential and prophetic, as it made a precise prediction for the exchange rate at which the drachma was eventually tied to the euro two years later, namely 1 euro = 340.75 drachmas.

== Pre-crisis early warning on the imbalances of the Greek economy ==
In October 2007, prior to the eruption of the Great Financial Crisis and the subsequent 2009-2018 Greek crisis, Professor Hardouvelis published a study warning about the consequences of the unfolding major fiscal and external imbalances of the Greek economy and the lethargic view of the markets about the imbalances. He stressed the importance of structural reforms, which had to be implemented in a specific sequence to be successful. When the Greek crisis erupted two years later, the proposed sequence was reversed and as a result the crisis lasted longer.

== A current index of economic policy uncertainty for Greece ==
Hardouvelis together with George Karalas, Dimitris Karanastasis, and Panayiotis Samartzis have constructed a widely followed monthly Economic Policy Uncertainty Index for Greece and several EPU sub-indices (regarding Monetary and Fiscal Policy, Currency, Banking and Pension Uncertainty). The indices go back to 1998 and are updated monthly with an extra month, as new information comes in for each new month. The index and its sub-indices are publicly available.

== Early life and education ==
Hardouvelis was born in 1955 in the village of Poulithra in Arcadia, Peloponnese, Greece to Angelos G. Hardouvelis (b.1915, d. 2000) and Zaharoula P. Constantinou-Hardouvelis (b.1925, d.1992). At the age of 12, after a regional competition, he won a full scholarship and for seven years he attended boarding school at Anatolia College in Thessaloniki, graduating in June 1974. After high school, in September 1974 he moved to the United States on full scholarship from Harvard University. During his four years at Harvard, he earned both a B.A. (with the honor of magna cum Laude) and an M.Sc. degree in Applied Mathematics (both degrees in 1978). Later he earned a Ph.D. in economics from U.C. Berkeley (1985). Since 1982, he is married to Susan Bezjian Hardouvelis and together they have two sons.

Political offices
Preceded by Yannis Stournaras	Minister of Finance; 2014–2015	Succeeded by Yanis Varoufakis
