= Angeliki Laiou =

Greek-American byzantinist and politician

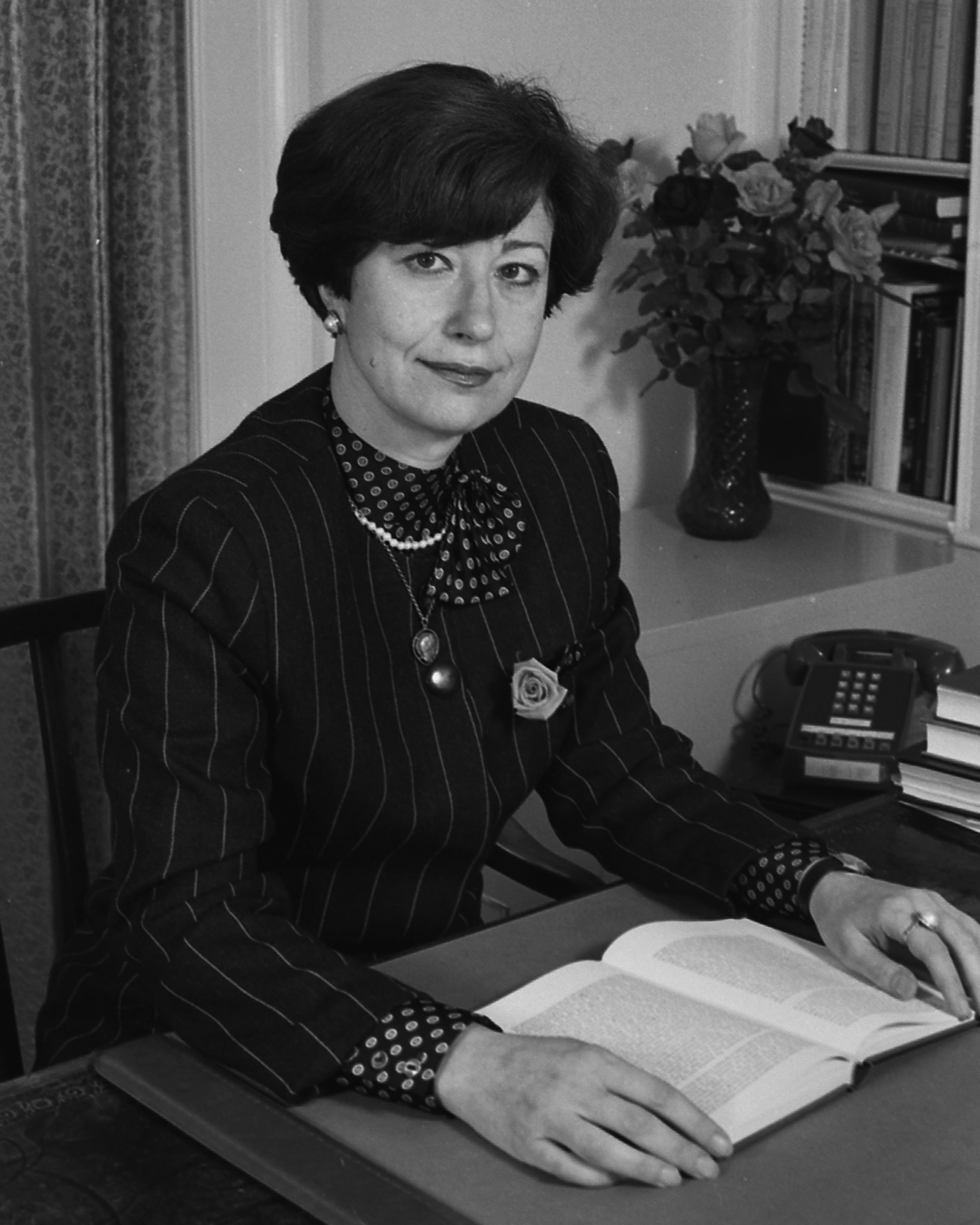
Angeliki Laiou (1941–2008)

Angeliki E. Laiou (Greek: Αγγελική Λαΐου; Athens, 6 April 1941 – Boston, 11 December 2008) was a Greek-American Byzantinist and politician. She taught at the University of Louisiana, Harvard University, Brandeis University, and Rutgers University. She was the Dumbarton Oaks Professor of Byzantine Studies at Harvard University from 1981 until her death. From 2000 to 2002, she was also a member of the Hellenic Parliament for the Panhellenic Socialist Movement (PASOK): she served as Deputy Secretary of Foreign Affairs for six months in 2000.

== Early life and education ==
Laiou was born in Athens on 6 April 1941 to a Greek family from Agios Gergios in Boeotia, Greece. She studied at Athens College and continued her studies in the Philosophy School of the University of Athens (1958–59), where she studied under the Greek Byzantinist Dionysios Zakythinos, who awakened her interest in the Byzantine Empire. She moved to Brandeis University from where she graduated with her BA in 1961, and completed a post-graduate course and received her PhD from Harvard University in 1966, under the supervision of Robert Lee Wolff, one of the leading historians of the Crusades. Her doctoral thesis became the basis for her first book, published in 1972 as Constantinople and the Latins: The Foreign Policy of Andronicus II, 1282–1328.

== Academic career ==
In 1962, she went to lecture at the University of Louisiana, before returning to Harvard, where she stayed from 1966 to 1972, first as instructor and then as assistant professor. She then moved to Brandeis University, where she remained until 1981, becoming distinguished professor. During this period, she also taught at Rutgers College of Rutgers University. In 1981, she returned to Harvard to occupy the prestigious Dumbarton Oaks Professorship of Byzantine Studies, a post she held until her death. In 1985–88, she served as the head of Harvard's History Department and from 1989 until 1998 she headed the distinguished Dumbarton Oaks Research Library and Collection in Washington, DC — the first woman to do so.

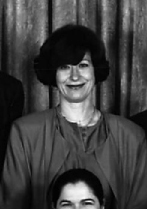
Laiou in 1992

With her Laiou pioneered the study of Byzantine and wider medieval society, and especially the role of women. Her article on The role of women in Byzantine society, published in the Jahrbuch der österreichischen Byzantinistik in 1981, "opened a new field for scholars of Byzantium". Her works on Peasant Society in the Late Byzantine Empire (1977) and Mariage, Amour et Parenté à Byzance Aux XIe-XIIIe Siècles (1992) were among the first studies in their field. During her last years, she presided over the compilation of the three-volume Economic History of Byzantium (2002), a definitive work in this until then rather neglected field, followed up a few years later by The Byzantine Economy (2007), her last book.

In her native Greece, she was honoured by being inducted into the Academy of Athens in 1998, only the second woman after the writer Galateia Saranti, and by being decorated with the Commander class of the Order of Honour. Laiou was also a corresponding member of the Académie des Inscriptions et Belles-Lettres, the Austrian Academy of Sciences, a foreign member of the Serbian Academy of Sciences and Arts, a member of the Medieval Academy of America and of the American Academy of Arts and Sciences, and an honorary professor at Nankai University.

== Political career ==
In the April 2000 elections, she was elected as a member of the Hellenic Parliament on the list of the Panhellenic Socialist Movement. In May 2000, she was also named as Deputy Secretary of Foreign Affairs charged with relations with the Greek diaspora. Disappointed with the realities of the job, she resigned the post six months later to resume her academic activities, and resigned her Parliament seat as well in 2002.

== Personal life ==
She was married to Stavros Thomadakis, a former chairman of the Greek Capital Market Commission, whom she later divorced. She is survived by a son, Vassilis Thomadakis.

Diagnosed with thyroid cancer in September 2008, she died in Boston on 11 December 2008.

== Major works ==
- Laiou, Angeliki E. (1972). Constantinople and the Latins: The Foreign Policy of Andronicus II, 1282–1328. Harvard University Press. ISBN 0674-16535-7.
- Laiou, Angeliki E. (1977). Peasant society in the late Byzantine Empire: a social and demographic study. Princeton University Press. ISBN 978-0-691-05252-6.
- Laiou, Angeliki E.; Maguire, Henry, eds. (1992). Byzantium, a world civilization. Dumbarton Oaks Research Library and Collection. ISBN 978-0-88402-200-8.
- Laiou, Angeliki E. (1992). Mariage, amour et parenté à Byzance aux XIe–XIIIe siècles (in French). Paris: De Boccard. ISBN 978-2-7018-0074-5.
- Laiou, Angeliki E., ed. (1993). Consent and coercion to sex and marriage in ancient and medieval societies. Dumbarton Oaks Research Library and Collection. ISBN 978-0-88402-213-8.
- Laiou, Angeliki E.; Simon, Dieter (1994). Law and society in Byzantium, 9th–12th centuries. Dumbarton Oaks. ISBN 978-0-88402-222-0.
- Ahrweiler, Hélène; Laiou, Angeliki E. (1998). Studies on the Internal Diaspora of the Byzantine Empire. Washington, D.C.: Dumbarton Oaks Research Library and Collection. ISBN 0-88402-247-1.
- May, Ernest R.; Laiou, Angeliki E. (1998). The Dumbarton Oaks conversations and the United Nations, 1944-1994. Dumbarton Oaks Research Library. ISBN 978-0-88402-255-8.
- Laiou, Angeliki E.; Mottahedeh, Roy Parviz, eds. (2001). The Crusades from the Perspective of Byzantium and the Muslim World. Washington, D.C.: Dumbarton Oaks Research Library and Collection. ISBN 0-88402-277-3. Archived from the original on 2010-11-23.
- Laiou, Angeliki E., ed. (2002). The Economic History of Byzantium from the Seventh through the Fifteenth Century. Dumbarton Oaks Research Library and Collection. ISBN 0-88402-288-9. Archived from the original on 2012-02-18.
- Laiou, Angeliki E., ed. (2005). Urbs capta: the Fourth Crusade and its consequences. Lethielleux. ISBN 978-2-283-60464-9.
- Laiou, Angeliki E.; Morrison, Cécile (2007). The Byzantine Economy. Cambridge, UK: Cambridge University Press. ISBN 978-0-521-84978-4.
