= Yannis Stournaras =

Greek economist (born 1956)

- Γιάννης Στουρνάρας
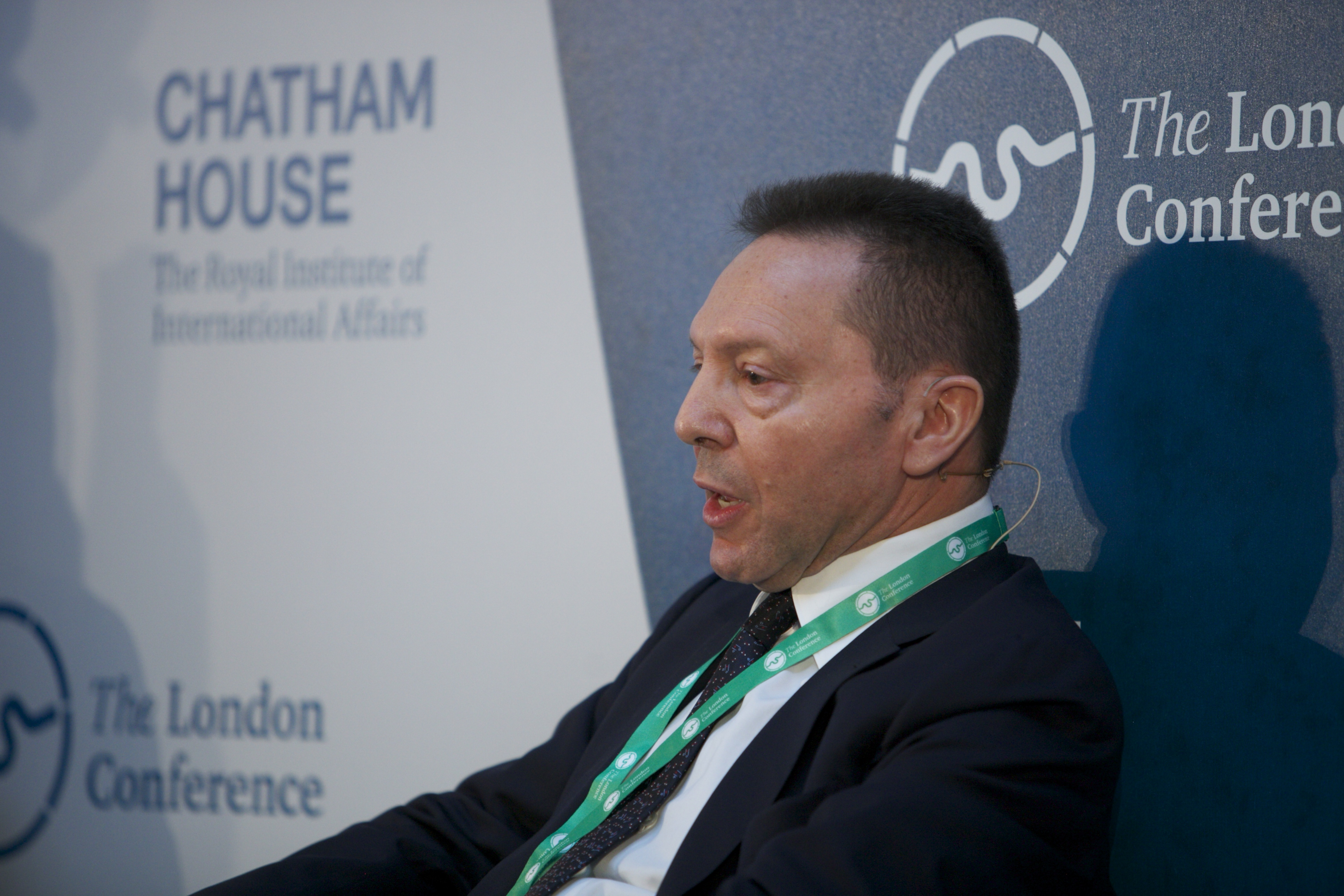

Governor of the Bank of Greece
- Incumbent
- Assumed office 20 June 2014
- Prime Minister: Antonis Samaras; Alexis Tsipras; Vassiliki Thanou; Alexis Tsipras; Kyriakos Mitsotakis; Ioannis Sarmas; Kyriakos Mitsotakis
- Preceded by: George Provopoulos

Minister of Finance
- In office 5 July 2012 – 10 June 2014
- Prime Minister: Antonis Samaras
- Preceded by: George Zanias
- Succeeded by: Gikas Hardouvelis

Minister for Development, Competitiveness and Shipping
- In office 17 May 2012 – 21 June 2012
- Prime Minister: Panagiotis Pikrammenos
- Preceded by: Anna Diamantopoulou
- Succeeded by: Kostis Chatzidakis (Development, Competitiveness, Infrastructure, Transport and Networks)

Personal details
- Born: 10 December 1956 (age 69) Athens, Greece
- Party: Independent
- Education: University of Athens (BA); St Catherine's College, Oxford (MPhil, DPhil)

Yannis (or Giannis) Stournaras (Greek: Γιάννης Στουρνάρας; born 10 December 1956) is a Greek economist who has been the Governor of the Bank of Greece since June 2014.

Previously, he had been the Greek Minister of Finance from 5 July 2012 serving until 10 June 2014. As every Governor of an IMF member country, he is on the Board of Governors of the International Monetary Fund.

== Early life and education ==
Stournaras received his undergraduate degree in economics from the University of Athens in 1978. He received a Master's degree (MPhil) and doctorate (DPhil) in economic theory and policy from the University of Oxford in 1980 and 1982 respectively.

== Academic career ==
From 1982 to 1986, Stournaras worked as a lecturer and research fellow at St Catherine's College, Oxford, and as a research fellow at the Oxford Institute for Energy Studies. He then returned to Greece where he worked as a special advisor to the Ministry of Finance from 1986 to 1989, to the Bank of Greece from 1989 to 1994, and for the Ministry of Finance again from 1994 to 2000.

Stournaras served as Chairman of the Council of Economic Advisers from 1994 to July 2000. In this capacity he helped formulate the Greece's macroeconomic policy in the run-up to Greece's accession to the European Monetary Union (Eurozone), and represented the Ministry of Finance at the Monetary Committee (now Economic and Financial Committee) of the European Union. He was also responsible for consultations with other international and supranational organisations such as the International Monetary Fund, the European Commission and the Organisation for Economic Co-operation and Development.

Stournaras has been a professor of economics at the University of Athens, which he joined in 1989. He is the director of the Foundation for Economic and Industrial Research (IOBE), a Greek think-tank.

== Policymaking career ==
In April 2026, Greek Prime Minister Kyriakos Mitsotakis proposed to renew Stournaras'a mandate as governor of the central bank for a third six-year term, until 2032. In May 2026, the Hellenic Parliament approved Stournaras' third term at the helm of the Greek central bank and in June 2026 Stournaras was sworn in for his third term as governor of the Bank of Greece.

== Other activities ==
- European Investment Bank (EIB), Member of the Appointment Advisory Committee (since 2017)
- European Systemic Risk Board (ESRB), Ex-Officio Member of the General Board (since 2017)
- International Monetary Fund (IMF), Ex-Officio Member of the Board of Governors (since 2014)

Political offices
Preceded by George Zanias	Minister of Finance; 2012–2014	Succeeded by Gikas Hardouvelis
Government offices
Preceded by George Provopoulos	Governor of the Bank of Greece; 2014–present	Incumbent
