= Bosphorius Magkafas =

The Right Reverend Father Bosphorius Magkafas
- Chief Secretary of the Holy and Sacred Synod
- Church: Ecumenical Patriarchate of Constantinople
- Appointed: 25 December 2023
- Predecessor: Gregorios Frangkakis

Orders
- Ordination: 25 December 2023 by Bartholomew I of Constantinople
- Rank: Archimandrite

Personal details
- Born: Panagiotis K. Magkafas (Παναγιώτης Κ. Μαγκαφάς); 31 May 1979 (age 47) Patras, Greece
- Denomination: Orthodox Christian
- Residence: Fener, Istanbul, Turkey
- Occupation: Priest, historian, theologian
- Education: University of Ioannina, Aristotle University of Thessaloniki

Bosphorius Magkafas (Greek: Βοσπόριος Μαγκαφάς; born 31 May 1979) is a Greek historian, theologian and priest of the Ecumenical Patriarchate of Constantinople. Since December 2023 he has served as Chief Secretary of the Holy and Sacred Synod of the Ecumenical Patriarchate.

== Early life and education ==
Panagiotis Magkafas was born in Patras, Greece, in May 1979. He graduated from the Classical Lyceum of Patras in 1997. Magkafas studied history and archaeology at the University of Ioannina, earning a bachelor of arts degree in 2001, and later completed a master's degree in Byzantine history in 2003. He also earned a bachelor's degree in theology from the Aristotle University of Thessaloniki.

During his student years he was active in academic and youth organizations, including serving on the student association of his university. From 1999 to 2001 he was president of the Lefkada local organization of ONNED, the youth wing of the Greek political party New Democracy.

He later worked at the University of Ioannina research committee, the Diplomatic and Historical Archive of the Ministry of Foreign Affairs, and the Northern Epirus Research Foundation. He speaks English, Italian and Turkish, in addition to his native Greek, and has knowledge of Ancient Greek and Latin.

== Clerical career ==
Before ordination Magkafas trained in Byzantine music and served as cantor in several communities, including the Holy Monastery of Virgin Mary 'Faneromeni' (the Revealed one) in Lefkada and the parish of Feriköy in Istanbul.

In 2002 he was tonsured as a reader by Metropolitan Nikiforos of Lefkada and Ithaca. He moved to Istanbul in 2011. On 8 October 2017 he was ordained deacon at the St. George's Patriarchal Cathedral by Ecumenical Patriarch Bartholomew I, who gave him the ecclesiastical name Bosphorius, in honor of Bishop Bosporius, and designated 11 May, the feast of the dedication of Constantinople, as his name day. He also received the title of Patriarchal Deacon. In 2018 he was appointed Codicographer of the Holy and Sacred Synod, and in March 2021 became Deputy Chief Secretary of the Holy and Sacred Synod.

On 25 December 2023 he was ordained presbyter, receiving the rank of Grand Archimandrite of the Ecumenical Throne, again by Patriarch Bartholomew. At the same time he was appointed as Chief Secretary the Holy and Sacred Synod.
