= Minas Dimakis =

Greek poet

Minas Dimakis (Greek: Μηνάς Δημάκης) (20 April 1913, Heraklion, Cretan State - 1980, Athens) was a Greek poet.

== Biography ==
Minas Dimakis was born 1913 in Heraklion, Crete, to Georgios Dimakis, a tradesman, and Maria Metaxaki. After his father's death in 1917, his mother got married again to Athanasios Spanoudakis with whom she had two more children: Ekaterini and Eleonora. His mother died in 1921. From 1919 to 1924 he studied at the lyceum O Korais and in 1930 he finished his high school studies at the Heraklion Gymnasium. He worked at the family enterprises till 1936, who were involved in the trade of grapes, and later was employed at the city's tourism office of Heraklion. In 1935 he published on his own his first copy of Leaves of Art (Φύλλα Τέχνης), a literary magazine that included poems and translations. Starting on 1937 he worked for the Bank of Greece in Heraklion, and in 1943 he was transferred to Athens, where he worked till 1959 when he decided to retire to dedicate his time to literature. During the Axis occupation of Greece, he collaborated with the National Liberation Front. He published critical essays for the Mesimvrini (Μεσημβρινή) newspaper between 1966 and 1967. Among the literary awards he obtained stand out the Second State Award of Poetry in 1960 and the Academy Award in Essay in 1973. Minás Dimákis committed suicide in Athens in 1980.
