= Sakis Karagiorgas =

Greek academic and resistant

Dionysios (Sakis) Karagiorgas; Greek: Διονύσιος (Σάκης) Καράγιωργας; 1930 – August 17, 1985) was an economist, born in Pyrgos, Elis. He was an active figure in the resistance against the Greek junta.

== Academic career ==
After studying economics in Greece and completing his doctorate at the London School of Economics, he worked at the Bank of Greece and later taught in multiple Greek universities.

In 1963, Karagiorgas was appointed as an assistant professor at the Higher Industrial School of Piraeus (now the University of Piraeus), where he taught Applied Economics. Two years later, in 1965, he was awarded the title of lecturer at the Athens School of Economics and Business, and a year after that, he became a professor at Panteion School of Political Sciences, holding the Chair of Public Finance. He taught at Panteion during the 1966–1967 academic year.

In 1967, he published his first textbook titled Lectures on Fiscal Policy, which dealt with Keynesian theory and economic stabilization policies.

== Resistance against the military junta ==
=== 1967–1969: "Democratic Defense" and injury ===
During the military dictatorship of the Colonels, Sakis Karagiorgas actively participated in the establishment of the anti-dictatorial organization "Democratic Defense", which engaged in resistance activities against the regime. In fact, several members (activists, students, academics) of the organization were ideologically affiliated with the Center for Political Research "Alexandros Papanastasiou." The resistance efforts included organizing students into cells, printing leaflets, and coordinating "Democratic Defense" with other resistance groups.

On July 14, 1969, Karagiorgas was severely injured by the explosion of an improvised explosive device intended for use against the military regime. The explosion resulted in the amputation of his right hand and head injuries. As soon as Karagiorgas was transferred to the hospital, he was arrested by agents of the junta, who, despite his critical condition, interrogated and subjected him to torture. Until the end of 1969, he was repeatedly transferred between detention centers (his transfers between detention facilities lasted for over five months), until he was eventually placed in solitary confinement in Averoff Prison alongside other members of the resistance.

=== 1970: testimony ===
In April 1970, Karagiorgas was tried along with 34 other resistance members by the Extraordinary Military Court of Athens. The trial of "Democratic Defense" became particularly significant in Greece's postwar history, as it was the first time that the junta's officials were publicly accused of torturing political and other opponents. The disclosure of interrogation and coercion methods used by the junta emerged from witness testimonies that were published in both the Greek and international press bringing attention to the regime's repressive practices.

In the same trial, Karagiorgas delivered his renowned testimony—a powerful and historic explanation of the motives behind his resistance activity. Through his statement, he linked his actions to the political situation in Greece. He also criticized the junta not only for its practices in the daily lives of Greeks but also for its approach to economic and foreign policy. Finally, he emphasized what he considered his personal duty to defend democracy in Greece.

==== Motives ====
Before the military court, Sakis Karagiorgas never denied his involvement in the resistance; on the contrary, he invoked his duty as an intellectual to fight for the freedom of the Greek people through Democratic Defense. Accordingly, he admitted to collaborating with Kostas Simitis in placing firecrackers at an ESSO-PAPAS gas station on Kifisias Avenue, an act he described as:

“an expression of strong protest against the dictatorial government […] and against figures such as Tom Pappas, who support the dictatorial regime.”

This charge was accepted by him, however, regarding other felonies attributed to him in the indictment, Karayiorgas emphasized that beyond these:

"I was forced to confess following the exercise of inhumane psychological violence and torture by the Security forces."

==== Political situation in Greece ====
Relating his actions to the political situation in Greece, Karagiorgas referred to the effective abolition of the 1952 constitution through the fraudulent 1968 constitutional referendum, by which

"the Greek people were alienated from their basic human rights, [...] which are inalienable. In our country (Greece) today, no constitution is applied, not even that of ’92%. Greece is a politically constitutionless country."

==== Economic policies of the Junta ====
As a trained economist, Sakis Karagiorgas did not hesitate to comment on the functioning of the Greek market during the Junta's rule[7]. In fact, he made an effort to deconstruct the theory of the Junta's “economic miracle” stressing that:

"The average annual growth rate in the decade before 1967 was close to 7%, while in 1967 and 1968 it fell to about 4%. The government (of the Junta) proceeded with reckless inflation due to deficits in the country’s balance of payments."

He also criticized the Junta for what he considered "economically unorthodox measures," such as the use of foreign exchange reserves to cover trade deficits and the contracting of "secret" loans under onerous terms. According to Karagiorgas, the result of these practices was an increase in Greek debt (by about 65%), while he held the Junta responsible for the economic bleeding of Greece, which would become apparent in the future.

==== Practices of the Junta ====
Karagiorgas referred to the international outcry Greece faced from numerous organizations regarding the Junta's practices to silence opposing voices. Moreover, he drew an analogy between the Junta and the famous book Nineteen Eighty-Four by George Orwell, which "describes a country under dictatorship. [...] To keep the dictatorial government in power, censorship, academic control, citizen policing, and torture as an interrogation method are used."

==== Duty to restore democracy ====
Towards the end of his defense, Sakis Karagiorgas invoked the duty he had to participate in the resistance against the Junta. His participation in the Democratic Defense was necessary in the face of history itself and a personal obligation toward his students:

"(A necessity) as a person respecting the history of all those who fought to bequeath to us freedom and democracy. As their (meaning the students) professor, I had nurtured the idea that correct decisions for the country’s future are made only through democratic processes. I would have been inconsistent if through my struggle I did not justify my ideas about freedom and democracy."

He concluded his defense by addressing the Greek people, to whom he felt he owed the greatest debt because

"This people educated me in Greek universities, sent me abroad on a scholarship for advanced studies, made me a professor at a higher education institution and a senior state official. I had an obligation to repay this great debt, even if it meant giving my life."

== Conviction ==
The raising of all these issues by Sakis Karagiorgas led the military court commissioner to request the death penalty for Karagiorgas. However, the publicity that the trial had received confronted the military court with nationwide and international outcry. Ultimately, the sentence was decided as life imprisonment and 18 years in prison based on Law 509 for "overthrowing the regime."

After his conviction, Karagiorgas was consecutively held in Averof prison, Kalamios prison in Chania (Itzedin), Alikarnassos, and Korydallos, where he remained until August 1973. He was released through the granting of amnesty, along with the majority of the resistance prisoners.

== Death ==
He died in 1985 at the age of 55, and his hometown honored his memory by naming the central square after him.

== Sakis Karagiorgas Foundation ==
On June 8, 1989, the "Sakis Karagiorgas Foundation" was established by presidential decree, in honor of the professor and rector of Panteion University who died in 1985.

The foundation's mission is to promote interdisciplinary research on the economic, political, and social dimensions of the state within contemporary social structures. It is to be specified that these research areas were central to Karagiorgas's academic inquiry and teaching.

More specifically, the foundation aims to investigate the organization of state functions, the role of the citizen in modern society, the structures of power and their relationship with the state, as well as to analyze various forms of social and economic policy implementation, with particular emphasis on fiscal policy. It also seeks to explore the impact of these policies on the distribution of income and wealth.
