= Rapanos =

Rapanos may mean:

- Rapanos v. United States, a 2006 United States Supreme Court case
- Vassilis Rapanos, the Finance Minister of Greece in June 2012
