= Opinion polling for the September 2015 Greek parliamentary election =

In the run up to the September 2015 Greek parliamentary election, various organisations carry out opinion polling to gauge voting intention in Greece. Results of such polls are displayed in this article.

The date range for these opinion polls are from the January 2015 Greek parliamentary election to the day the next election was held, on 20 September 2015.

== Election polling ==
=== Vote ===
Graphical summary

Local regression trend line of poll results from 25 January to 20 September 2015, with each line corresponding to a political party.

Poll results

The tables below list nationwide voting intention estimates. Refusals are generally excluded from the party vote percentages, while question wording and the treatment of "don't know" responses and those not intending to vote may vary between polling organisations. Polls that show their results without disregarding those respondents who were undecided or said they would abstain from voting (either physically or by voting blank) have been re-calculated by disregarding these numbers from the totals offered through a simple rule of three, in order to obtain results comparable to other polls and the official election results. When available, seat projections are displayed below the percentages in a smaller font. 151 seats were required for an absolute majority in the Hellenic Parliament.

Color key:

Exit poll

Polling firm/Commissioner	Fieldwork date	Sample size	Syriza	ND	XA	Potami	KKE	ANEL	PASOK	KIDISO	EK	LAE	Lead
September 2015 parliamentary election	20 Sep 2015	—	35.5; 145	28.1; 75	7.0; 18	4.1; 11	5.6; 15	3.7; 10	6.3; 17	–	3.4; 9	2.9; 0	7.4
Singular Logic	20 Sep 2015 (21:00)	?	35.5; 145	28.0; 75	7.1; 19	4.0; 10	5.5; 15	3.7; 10	6.4; 17	–	3.4; 9	2.8; 0	7.5
Metron–Alco–GPO–Opinion–Marc–MRB	20 Sep 2015 (20:30)	8,000	34.6– 37.0	26.8– 29.2	5.6– 6.8	3.8– 4.8	5.7– 6.9	2.6– 3.4	5.5– 6.7	–	3.3– 4.3	2.5– 3.3	7.8
Kapa Research/To Vima	20 Sep 2015 (20:00)	5,000	33.8; 144	28.5; 75	7.2; 20	4.0; 10	5.8; 15	3.9; 10	6.9; 17	–	3.5; 9	2.9; 0	5.3
Metron–Alco–GPO–Opinion–Marc–MRB	20 Sep 2015 (20:00)	8,000	33.0– 35.0; 139/143	28.5– 30.0; 75/80	7.0– 8.0; 18/22	4.0– 4.5; 10/12	5.5– 6.5; 12/15	3.0– 4.0; 8/10	6.0– 7.0; 16/20	–	3.0– 4.0; 8/10	2.5– 3.0; 0	4.5– 5.0
Kapa Research/To Vima	20 Sep 2015 (19:00)	5,000	32.0; 133/136	29.5; 77/79	7.0; 18/19	5.0; 13	6.4; 17	3.5; 9	6.6; 17/18	–	3.0; 0/8	3.2; 8/9	2.5
PAMAK	20 Sep 2015 (19:00)	?	31.0– 35.0	29.0– 33.0	6.0– 8.0	3.5– 5.5	5.0– 7.0	2.5– 4.5	5.0– 7.0	–	2.5– 4.5	2.5– 3.5	2.0
Pulse RC/Action24	20 Sep 2015 (19:00)	?	29.5– 34.5	28.5– 33.5	5.0– 8.0	4.5– 7.5	4.5– 7.5	1.5– 4.5	5.0– 8.0	–	2.0– 5.0	2.0– 5.0	1.0
Metron–Alco–GPO–Opinion–Marc–MRB	20 Sep 2015 (19:00)	8,000	30.0– 34.0; 127/137	28.5– 32.5; 73/83	6.5– 8.0; 16/22	4.0– 5.5; 10/14	5.5– 7.0; 14/18	3.0– 4.0; 8/10	5.5– 7.0; 14/18	–	3.2– 4.2; 9/12	2.5– 3.5; 8/9	1.5
Kapa Research/To Vima	17–18 Sep 2015	1,201	33.0	29.9	6.8	5.4	6.0	3.2	6.3	–	3.4	3.3	3.1
MRB/Star	17–18 Sep 2015	?	31.8	31.9	7.1	6.0	5.1	2.8	5.9	–	3.6	3.3	0.1
PAMAK/Skai	17–18 Sep 2015	1,083	34.0	31.0	7.0	5.0	5.5	2.0	5.5	–	3.5	3.5	3.0
Palmos Analysis/tvxs	17–18 Sep 2015	?	32.5	31.5	7.5	4.5	7.0	2.5	5.5	–	3.0	4.0	1.0
MRB/Star	17–18 Sep 2015	?	31.7	30.6	6.6	6.0	5.7	3.2	5.7	–	4.0	3.9	1.1
GPO/Mega TV	16–18 Sep 2015	1,200	32.4	29.5	6.9	5.5	6.5	3.4	6.8	–	3.2	4.4	2.9
Rass/iefimerida	16–18 Sep 2015	1,002	31.7	30.9	7.5	4.6	6.1	2.8	6.7	–	3.4	3.4	0.8
Marc/Alpha TV	15–18 Sep 2015	1,754	31.7; 135	30.4; 81	6.9; 18	5.9; 16	5.8; 15	2.9; 0	5.8; 15	–	4.0; 11	3.3; 9	1.3
ProRata/EfSyn	17 Sep 2015	1,003	32.0	28.5	8.0	6.0	6.5	3.0	6.0	–	4.0	3.0	3.5
Metron Analysis/ANT1	16–17 Sep 2015	1,204	31.7; 132	31.2; 80	7.1; 18	5.8; 15	6.0; 15	3.0; 8	6.0; 15	–	3.1; 8	3.4; 9	0.5
Bridging Europe	15–17 Sep 2015	1,031	31.7	27.8	7.1	4.7	6.7	2.6	5.3	–	2.4	5.8	3.9
Metrisi/Eleftheros Typos	15–17 Sep 2015	?	30.7	32.3	6.3	5.3	6.1	3.1	5.8	–	3.5	3.6	1.6
Pulse RC/To Pontiki	15–17 Sep 2015	1,605	30.5	30.5	7.5	6.0	6.0	2.5	7.5	–	3.0	3.5	Tie
Interview/Vergina TV	15–17 Sep 2015	1,000	30.5	33.0	5.5	5.0	6.5	2.5	6.5	–	4.5	2.5	2.5
Alco/NewsIT	15–17 Sep 2015	1,000	30.7	30.3	7.5	5.2	7.0	3.0	5.7	–	4.5	3.7	0.4
AUTH	14–17 Sep 2015	?	31.1	29.6	7.8	4.9	5.8	2.3	6.1	–	3.0	5.4	1.5
Public Issue	14–17 Sep 2015	1,009	33.0; 139	30.0; 81	7.0; 19	4.5; 12	6.5; 18	2.5; 0	8.0; 22	–	2.5; 0	3.5; 9	3.0
Metron Analysis/Parapolitika	15–16 Sep 2015	?	31.6; 84	31.9; 134	6.7; 18	5.9; 16	6.2; 16	2.7; 0	5.2; 14	–	3.6; 9	3.4; 9	0.3
E-Voice/dikaiologitika.gr	15–16 Sep 2015	1,007	32.6	28.5	8.1	5.7	5.6	3.5	5.6	–	2.9	4.7	4.1
Kapa Research/To Vima	15–16 Sep 2015	1,007	31.3	30.7	7.2	5.4	5.9	3.2	6.4	–	3.5	3.8	0.6
ProRata/EfSyn	15 Sep 2015	1,000	33.0	28.0	9.0	6.0	6.0	3.0	6.0	–	3.5	3.5	5.0
GPO/Ethnikos Kirikas	14–15 Sep 2015	1,060	31.5	31.5	6.8	4.8	5.8	3.4	6.8	–	3.4	3.6	Tie
PAMAK/Skai	14–15 Sep 2015	2,214	31.5	32.0	7.0	5.5	6.0	2.5	5.5	–	4.0	3.0	0.5
Pulse RC/Action24	14–15 Sep 2015	1,258	30.0	30.5	7.5	6.0	6.0	2.5	7.5	–	3.0	4.0	0.5
Data RC/pelop.gr	11–14 Sep 2015	1,063	31.7	32.7	6.7	5.6	6.3	3.2	6.9	–	3.1	3.2	1.0
Metron Analysis/ANT1	10–14 Sep 2015	1,403	31.6; 80/130	31.6; 80/130	7.2; 18	5.9; 15	6.2; 16	3.0; 8	5.3; 13	–	3.9; 10	3.8; 10	Tie
Pulse RC/To Pontiki	10–11 Sep 2015	1,204	30.0	30.0	7.5	6.0	6.0	2.5	7.0	–	4.0	4.5	Tie
Palmos Analysis/tvxs	10–11 Sep 2015	1,004	33.5; 135	30.5; 77	7.0; 18	5.5; 14	5.0; 13	3.5; 9	6.0; 15	–	4.5; 11	3.0; 8	3.0
GPO/Mega TV	10–11 Sep 2015	1,200	30.4	30.1	7.6	5.1	6.7	3.5	7.0	–	3.9	4.2	0.3
Bridging Europe	9–11 Sep 2015	1,028	32.8	24.6	7.8	5.9	6.6	2.6	3.8	–	2.8	7.8	8.2
PAMAK/Skai	9–11 Sep 2015	2,001	31.0	30.0	7.5	5.5	6.5	2.0	6.0	–	5.0	3.5	1.0
Kapa Research/To Vima	9–10 Sep 2015	1,008	29.7	29.2	7.8	5.6	6.6	3.5	6.8	–	4.0	4.7	0.5
Alco/Proto Thema	8–10 Sep 2015	1,000	30.6; 128/130	29.7; 75/78	7.8; 20	4.8; 12/13	7.4; 19/20	3.1; 0/8	6.2; 16	–	4.7; 12	4.0; 10/11	0.9
Metron Analysis/Parapolitika	8–10 Sep 2015	1,206	31.7; 131	31.3; 80	6.2; 16	5.5; 14	5.9; 15	3.0; 8	5.2; 13	–	5.9; 15	3.3; 8	0.4
Public Issue	5–10 Sep 2015	1,009	31.0	31.0	7.0	4.5	6.5	2.0	8.0	–	3.0	4.0	Tie
ProRata/EfSyn	7–9 Sep 2015	1,300	34.5	28.5	8.0	5.0	5.5	3.0	5.5	–	4.0	3.0	6.0
ProRata/HellasNet	5–9 Sep 2015	1,300	34.0	28.5	8.0	5.0	5.5	3.0	5.5	–	4.0	3.0	5.5
Pulse RC/Action24	7–8 Sep 2015	1,319	30.5	30.0	7.5	6.0	6.5	2.0	7.0	–	4.0	4.0	0.5
GPO/Ethnikos Kirikas	3–4 Sep 2015	1,071	30.0	30.5	7.4	5.4	5.7	3.6	6.8	–	4.5	4.8	0.5
MRB/Star	3–4 Sep 2015	1,003	29.6	29.6	7.1	5.4	5.9	2.7	6.1	–	4.6	4.3	Tie
Pulse RC/bankingnews.gr	2–4 Sep 2015	1,108	30.0	29.5	7.0	6.0	6.0	3.0	6.5	–	4.5	4.5	0.5
Public Issue	1–4 Sep 2015	1,002	28.5; 75	30.0; 129	7.0; 18	5.5; 15	7.5; 20	2.0; 0	8.0; 21	–	3.5; 9	5.0; 13	1.5
Marc/Ethnos	1–4 Sep 2015	1,032	30.4	29.9	7.4	6.3	6.0	3.5	5.4	–	4.5	4.5	0.5
Kapa Research/To Vima	2–3 Sep 2015	?	30.0	29.3	7.4	5.8	6.0	3.4	6.6	–	4.0	5.3	0.7
PAMAK/Skai	1–3 Sep 2015	1,041	30.0	30.0	7.5	6.0	6.5	1.5	5.0	–	5.0	4.5	Tie
Bridging Europe	1–3 Sep 2015	1,023	32.6	24.0	7.4	7.1	6.8	2.4	3.8	–	2.9	7.5	8.6
Pulse RC/To Pontiki	1–2 Sep 2015	1,105	30.0	29.5	7.5	6.0	6.0	3.0	6.5	–	4.0	5.0	0.5
AUTH	31 Aug–2 Sep 2015	?	27.1	28.2	9.6	5.3	5.5	2.1	4.2	–	4.8	8.6	1.1
Metron Analysis/Parapolitika	31 Aug–2 Sep 2015	1,207	29.6; 79	30.4; 131	6.5; 17	6.0; 16	6.5; 17	2.6; 0	5.0; 14	–	5.1; 14	4.3; 12	0.8
GPO/Mega TV	31 Aug–2 Sep 2015	?	30.5	30.9	6.7	5.6	6.2	3.7	6.5	–	3.9	4.9	0.4
Alco/NewsIT	31 Aug–2 Sep 2015	1,000	29.2	28.7	7.8	5.5	6.9	2.6	5.3	–	4.6	4.9	0.5
Pulse RC/Action24	31 Aug–1 Sep 2015	1,108	30.5	29.5	7.5	6.0	6.0	3.0	6.0	1.0	3.5	5.0	1.0
Alco/Proto Thema	25–28 Aug 2015	1,000	29.3	27.4	8.1	6.6	6.1	3.1	5.3	1.6	3.9	5.2	1.9
Marc/Alpha TV	25–28 Aug 2015	?	31.2	28.6	6.8	7.1	5.2	3.7	5.4	–	4.7	4.7	2.6
E-Voice/HellasNet	26–27 Aug 2015	?	32.0	26.9	7.1	5.4	4.8	4.2	4.0	–	3.5	4.8	5.1
PAMAK/Skai	25–27 Aug 2015	1,100	29.0	25.5	6.5	7.0	7.0	2.5	5.5	–	5.5	6.0	3.5
MRB/Agora	25–27 Aug 2015	1,008	29.6	27.4	7.5	6.7	5.7	2.8	4.7	–	5.7	5.1	2.2
Metron Analysis/Parapolitika	24–27 Aug 2015	?	29.0; 129	27.8; 75	8.3; 23	6.7; 18	5.9; 16	2.3; 0	5.4; 15	–	4.9; 13	4.1; 11	1.2
Kapa Research/To Vima	25–26 Aug 2015	1,005	31.5	27.9	7.8	6.3	5.8	3.5	4.6	–	3.8	5.5	3.6
ProRata/EfSyn	25–26 Aug 2015	1,000	31.0	26.0	8.5	5.5	6.5	2.5	6.0	–	4.0	4.5	5.0
Rass/To Paron	24–26 Aug 2015	1,003	29.5	26.8	7.0	7.2	6.8	2.8	3.8	–	5.2	6.4	2.7
Bridging Europe	24–26 Aug 2015	1,015	33.4	22.8	7.4	7.7	7.2	3.0	3.6	–	3.2	7.6	10.6
Interview/Vergina TV	24–25 Aug 2015	?	29.0	26.5	7.0	6.5	5.5	4.0	5.5	–	5.0	5.5	2.5
Bridging Europe	22–24 Jul 2015	1,010	41.2	23.1	7.3	7.9	6.5	5.1	3.7	–	–	–	18.1
Metron Analysis/Parapolitika	20–21 Jul 2015	?	41.2	21.9	6.6	7.5	5.1	3.4	4.4	1.6	4.0	–	19.3
Palmos Analysis/EfSyn	15–17 Jul 2015	1,004	42.5; 164	21.5; 58	6.5; 17	8.0; 22	5.5; 16	3.0; 8	6.0; 17	–	–	–	21.0
Metron Analysis/Parapolitika	8–9 Jul 2015	?	45.6	22.6	5.1	6.3	4.5	3.2	5.0	1.3	4.1	–	23.0
Marc	3 Jul 2015	?	40.5	24.9	5.0	6.2	5.2	3.7	5.6	–	3.0	–	15.6
ProRata	2 Jul 2015	?	42.0	24.0	8.0	6.5	6.5	2.5	3.0	–	2.5	–	18.0
Alco/Proto Thema	24–26 Jun 2015	1,000	38.6	25.5	6.3	6.3	6.1	3.9	4.6	1.8	2.3	–	13.1
Public Issue	11–17 Jun 2015	1,006	47.5	19.5	6.5	6.5	5.5	4.0	4.5	–	2.0	–	28.0
ProRata/Sto Kokkino	15–16 Jun 2015	1,006	43.0	17.5	7.5	7.5	5.0	4.0	4.0	1.5	4.0	–	25.5
GPO/Mega TV	15 Jun 2015	?	39.7	26.0	6.2	6.8	6.1	4.2	3.6	–	3.1	–	13.7
Metrisi/Proto Thema	10–12 Jun 2015	?	37.6	28.2	5.8	7.1	6.2	5.9	3.6	–	–	–	9.4
Marc/Alpha TV	7–10 Jun 2015	1,001	41.2	23.6	6.0	7.6	6.3	4.5	3.9	1.3	2.2	–	17.6
Metron Analysis/Parapolitika	6 Jun 2015	?	45.0	21.4	5.3	7.4	5.2	3.8	3.5	2.1	1.3	–	23.6
PAMAK/Skai	3–6 Jun 2015	1,058	43.0	20.5	7.0	7.0	6.0	3.5	4.5	–	–	–	22.5
Alco/NewsIT	3–4 Jun 2015	1,000	39.2	25.6	6.0	6.6	5.6	4.0	4.3	1.2	2.0	–	13.6
Metrisi/Proto Thema	28–29 May 2015	?	37.8	27.4	5.8	7.2	6.0	6.0	3.5	–	–	–	10.4
Metrisi/Proto Thema	20–22 May 2015	1,108	38.0	27.2	5.8	7.1	5.9	6.0	3.5	–	–	–	10.8
Public Issue	13–19 May 2015	1,013	48.5	21.0	6.0	5.5	6.0	3.5	4.0	–	–	–	27.5
PAMAK/Skai	13–15 May 2015	1,023	45.0	19.0	7.5	7.5	5.0	3.5	3.5	–	–	–	26.0
Rass/To Paron	5–7 May 2015	1,002	43.7	23.3	5.0	7.2	5.8	5.1	4.0	–	1.8	–	20.4
MRB/Real News	5–7 May 2015	1,006	41.8	24.2	5.9	6.7	6.4	4.7	3.5	1.2	2.5	–	17.6
Marc/EfSyn	5–7 May 2015	1,001	41.6	24.1	6.2	7.7	5.7	4.7	3.6	1.5	1.7	–	17.5
Palmos Analysis/SBC TV	5–6 May 2015	1,036	44.5; 170	20.5; 55	6.5; 18	8.5; 23	5.0; 14	4.0; 11	3.5; 9	–	–	–	24.0
ProRata/Sto Kokkino	4–6 May 2015	1,000	47.5	18.5	6.0	6.5	6.0	3.5	3.5	1.5	2.0	–	29.0
Metrisi/Proto Thema	28–30 Apr 2015	?	39.1	27.8	5.6	6.5	5.8	5.8	3.9	–	–	–	11.3
GPO/Mega TV	29 Apr 2015	?	40.6	24.4	6.1	7.2	6.1	5.6	4.4	–	2.0	–	16.2
Marc/Alpha TV	25–28 Apr 2015	1,001	41.3	24.1	6.1	6.7	5.9	4.9	3.2	1.6	1.7	–	17.2
Alco/Proto Thema	20–23 Apr 2015	1,000	42.7	26.0	6.0	6.1	6.1	4.3	3.9	–	1.8	–	16.7
Kapa Research/To Vima	21–22 Apr 2015	1,007	41.0	24.1	6.3	8.1	5.6	5.1	4.3	–	–	–	16.9
Metrisi/Proto Thema	14–16 Apr 2015	?	39.4	27.5	5.9	6.3	5.9	5.6	3.5	–	–	–	11.9
Metron Analysis/Parapolitika	2–4 Apr 2015	?	45.6	20.9	5.5	7.5	5.0	3.8	4.3	1.7	2.2	–	24.7
Metrisi/Proto Thema	31 Mar–2 Apr 2015	?	40.3	27.0	6.2	6.2	5.8	5.5	3.3	–	–	–	13.3
Metrisi/iefimerida	17–20 Mar 2015	1,008	40.9	26.8	6.7	5.9	5.9	4.8	3.1	–	–	–	14.1
Palmos Analysis/SBC TV	17–19 Mar 2015	1,006	51.5; 192	20.5; 56	4.5; 12	5.0; 14	5.5; 15	4.0; 11	2.5; 0	–	–	–	31.0
Marc/Alpha TV	18 Mar 2015	?	44.8	23.4	5.4	4.8	5.5	5.0	2.8	2.0	1.6	–	21.4
Metron Analysis/Parapolitika	16–18 Mar 2015	?	47.8	21.1	6.1	5.6	4.5	4.4	3.4	2.2	2.1	–	26.7
Interview/Vergina TV	16–17 Mar 2015	1,000	46.4	19.8	6.7	4.9	6.0	5.6	3.7	–	–	–	26.6
MRB/Star	27 Feb–2 Mar 2015	1,009	46.2	21.5	5.7	6.0	5.9	6.0	3.2	–	2.1	–	24.7
Metron Analysis/Parapolitika	24–25 Feb 2015	?	47.6	20.7	5.9	6.4	4.7	4.3	3.4	1.6	2.8	–	26.9
Marc/Alpha TV	12–13 Feb 2015	1,005	49.4	20.0	5.1	5.0	5.2	5.1	3.0	2.2	2.0	–	29.4
January 2015 parliamentary election	25 Jan 2015	—	36.3; 149	27.8; 76	6.3; 17	6.1; 17	5.5; 15	4.8; 13	4.7; 13	2.5; 0	1.8; 0	–	8.5
