= UniPi =

UniPi may refer to:

- University of Piraeus, Greece
- University of Pisa, Italy
