= HCMC (disambiguation) =

HCMC usually refers to Ho Chi Minh City, the largest city in Vietnam.

HCMC may also refer to:

- Hellenic Capital Market Commission, a financial regulator in Greece
- Hennepin County Medical Center, a hospital in Minneapolis, Minnesota, United States
- Candala Airport, an airstrip in Somalia (ICAO code: HCMC)
