= Filippos Sachinidis =

Greek politician

Filippos Sachinidis Φίλιππος Σαχινίδης
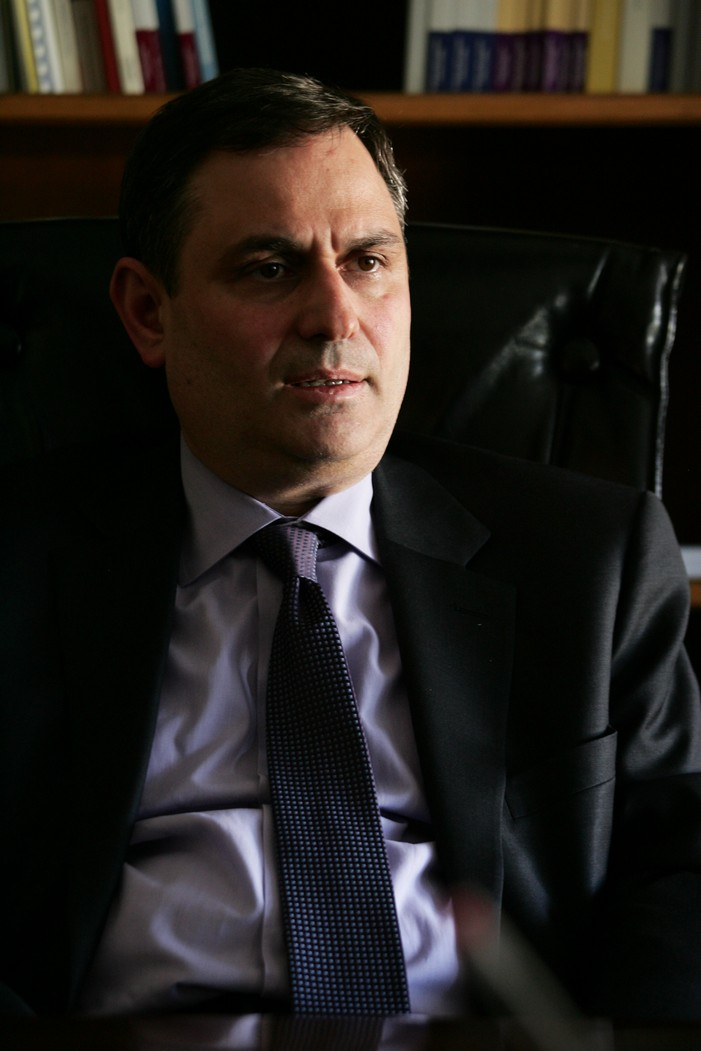

Minister of Finance
- In office 21 March 2012 – 17 May 2012
- Prime Minister: Lucas Papademos
- Preceded by: Evangelos Venizelos
- Succeeded by: George Zanias

Personal details
- Born: 1963 (age 62–63) Vancouver, British Columbia, Canada
- Party: Panhellenic Socialist Movement (2004–2015); Movement of Democratic Socialists (2015–2026); Movement for Change (2018–present)
- Spouse: Rania Karageorgou
- Children: 1 (son)
- Education: University of Piraeus; City University of New York, City College; University of Manchester
- Website: Official website

Filippos Sachinidis (Greek: Φίλιππος Σαχινίδης; born 1963) is a Greek politician of the Movement for Change. Elected on the list of his former party PASOK, he served as a Member of the Hellenic Parliament from 2007 to 2014. In 2012, he briefly served as Minister of Finance in the Coalition Cabinet of Lucas Papademos.

== Early life and education ==
Born in Canada to ethnic Greek parents in 1963, Sachinidis grew up in Larisa. He studied Economics at the University of Piraeus and received his Master of Arts in Economics from City College of New York. In 1994, he received a Ph.D. from the University of Manchester in the United Kingdom.

== Career ==
Sachinidis is an economist for the National Bank of Greece and served as an economic advisor to Greek Prime Minister Costas Simitis from 2000 to 2004. In 2007, Sachinidis was elected on the list of the Panhellenic Socialist Movement (PASOK) to represent the Larissa constituency in the Hellenic Parliament. He was reelected in 2009 and twice in 2012.

Following the victory of PASOK in the national elections of 2009, he was made Deputy Minister of Finance under George Papaconstantnou. On 17 June 2011, Sachinidis was appointed Alternate Minister of Finance under Evangelos Venizelos. When Venizelos resigned on 21 March 2012, Sachinidis became Minister of Finance under Prime Minister Lucas Papademos, serving until May 17, 2012.

On 3 January 2015, it was announced that Sachinidis would join former prime minister Papandreou in leaving PASOK to found the new Movement of Democratic Socialists. Sachinidis and George Petalotis were appointed the media representatives of the new party.

Sachinidis is a member of Movement for Change since its inception.

== Personal life ==
Sachinidis is married to Rania Karageorgou and they have one son, Dimitris.

Political offices
Preceded by Evangelos Venizelos	Minister of Finance; 2012	Succeeded by George Zanias
