= 1990–1991 student protests in Greece =

The 1990–1991 student protests in Greece were carried out against an education-related bill proposed by the New Democracy-led Greek government. The protests were accompanied by school occupations, and the students were subjected to violent attacks from the Hellenic Police and organizations aligned with New Democracy. Five people were killed during the demonstrations; mathematics teacher and left-wing activist Nikos Temponeras was assassinated during an attack by members of the Youth Organisation of New Democracy (ONNED) in Patras in January 1991, and, two days later, another four people died in a fire caused by a tear gas agent used by the police in Athens.

== Cause ==
The protests were caused by an education bill proposed by Konstantinos Mitsotakis' government and published in the Government Gazette on November 21, 1990. Among other things, the bill included:

- Abolition of the right of secondary education students to a number of unexcused absences from class.
- Enforcement of mandatory school uniforms.
- Disciplinary control of students' lives outside of school.
- Abolition of school walks and excursions.
- Exams administered as a requirement to advance from junior to senior high school with no right to re-examination.
- Abolition of the free provision of scientific textbooks to university students.
- Abolition of social provisions to university students, such as free food and accommodations.

== Student occupation ==
In response to the bill, seen as old-fashioned and conservative for its era, students began occupying schools across Greece in late 1990 and early 1991. Eventually 2,000 high schools (70% of the total) were occupied by students over a seven week period. This was described as the biggest challenge yet to the 10-month rule of Prime Minister Konstantinos Mitsotakis and his New Democracy party.

== Response to the occupation ==
On January 8, 1991, students and their supporters occupying a school in Patras were attacked by a local ONNED branch, resulting in the death of school teacher and occupation supporter Nikos Temponeras, who was hit in the head with an iron bar by the ONNED branch president, Ioannis Kalampokas.

The killing was followed by a protest in Athens that drew over 100,000 people, and smaller protests in other Greek cities also broke out. During the protest in Athens on January 10, 1991, a store on Panepistimiou Street caught fire, resulting in the deaths of four people. The fire was started by a tear gas agent thrown inside the building by riot police, who also attacked the firefighting forces that rushed to the fire's location.

== Outcome ==
The education bill was withdrawn by Georgios Souflias, who had replaced Vasilis Kontogiannopoulos as Minister of Education after the latter resigned following the assassination of Nikos Temponeras.
