= Spyridon Kapnisis =

Greek chess grandmaster (born 1981)

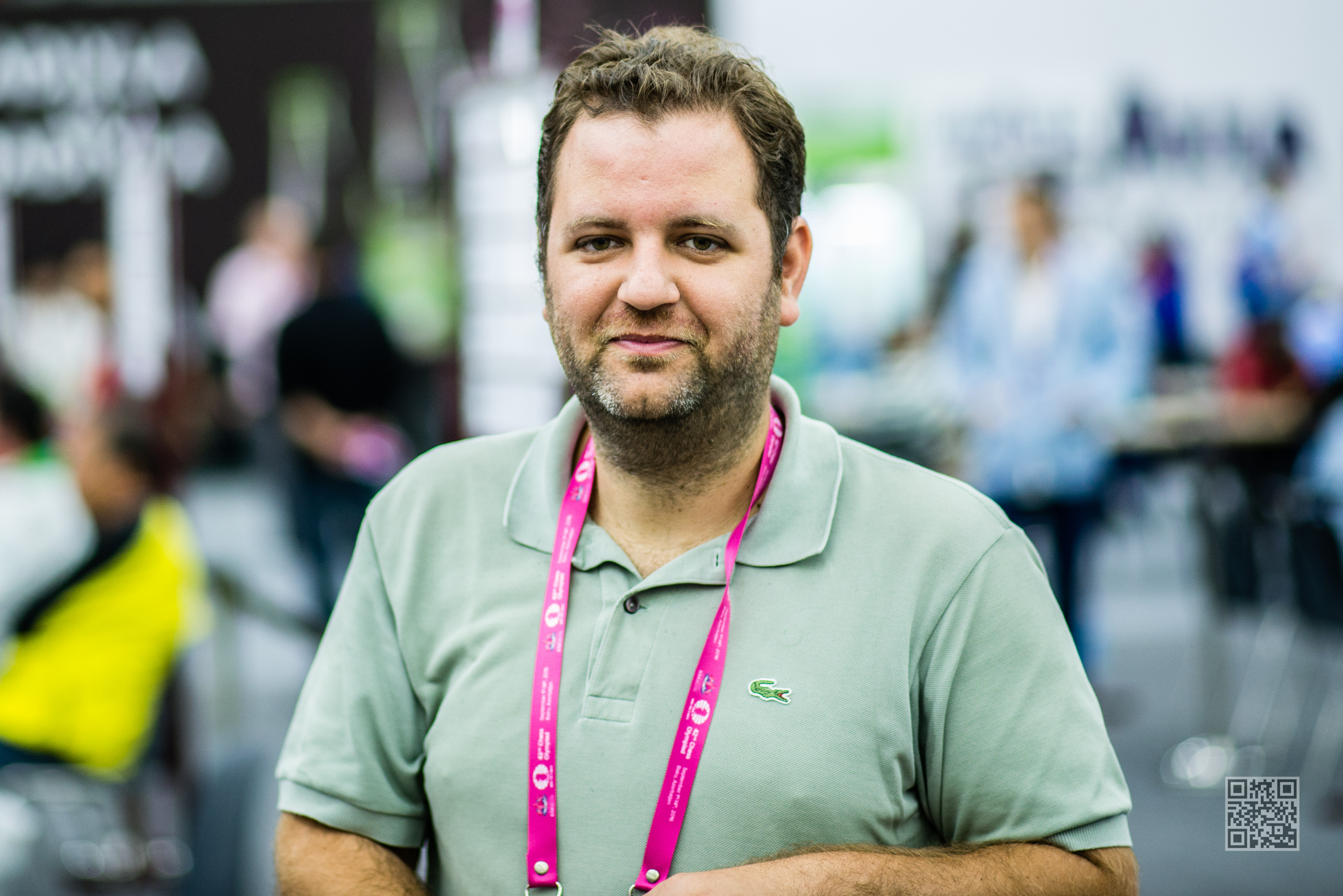
- Spiridon Kapnisis, 2016

Personal information
- Born: May 11, 1981 (age 45)

Chess career
- Country: Greece
- Title: Grandmaster (2011)
- Peak rating: 2529 (July 2011)

Spyridon Kapnisis (Greek: Σπυρίδων (Σπύρος) Καπνίσης; is a Greek chess player. He was awarded the title of chess grandmaster in 2011.

== Chess career ==
In 2003, Kapnisis won the Mediterranean Chess Championship taking place in Beirut, Lebanon with 7.5 points in 9 rounds

He was awarded the title of International Master in 2004 and the title of Grandmaster in 2011. He achieved his peak rating of 2529 in July 2011.

He has served as coach of the Greek national teams in events including the 43rd Chess Olympiad.

== Personal life ==
Kapnisis has studied finance in University of Piraeus
