= Council of Economic Advisers (Greece) =

- Abbreviation: SOE
- Formation: 1987
- Type: Government agency
- Purpose: Advisory board
- Region served: Greece
- Chairman: George Chouliarakis
- Parent organisation: Ministry of Finance

The Council of Economic Advisers (Greek: Συμβούλιο Οικονομικών Εμπειρογνωμόνων; SOE) is an advisory body that is part of the Greek Ministry of Finance. The current Chairman of the Council is George Chouliarakis, also an Alternate Minister of Finance.

== Purpose and role ==
According to Panos Tsakloglou, former Chairman of the Council of Economic Advisers, the Council is "the think tank of the government in economic issues." It consists of "a board composed of academics, which meet regularly, and a scientific team that operates on a daily basis." Practically, it is responsible for representing Greece in EU and other international organisations' working groups, for monitoring the implementation of the memorandum, for carrying out various ad hoc duties within the Ministry of Finance, and for providing expertise to the Greek government when they request it.

The Chairman of the Council of Economic Advisers represents Greece in EU working groups and on the Economic and Financial Committee. They are also Greece's deputy at meetings of the Eurogroup and the Economic and Financial Affairs Council (ECOFIN). In April 2015, George Chouliarakis, then-Chairman, became Greece's representative to the 'Brussels Group' - the detailed technical negotiations taking place in Brussels over the third bailout package.

== Composition ==
- Chairman – George Chouliarakis
- Marianthi Anastasatou
- Eirini Andriopoulou
- Christos Antonopoulos
- Andreas Katsaros

=== Past chairs and members ===
Past chairs include:

- George Chouliarakis, 2015–present
- Tassos Anastasatos, 2014–2015
- Christodoulos Stefanadis, 2014
- Panos Tsakloglou, 2012–2014
- George Zanias, 2009–2012
- Vassilis Rapanos, 2000–2004
- Yannis Stournaras, 1994–2000

Past members include:

- Stavros Thomadakis
