= Stavros Thomadakis =

Greek economist

Stavros Thomadakis is a Greek economist who served as chairman of the Hellenic Capital Market Commission, Professor of Finance at the University of Athens and chairman of the Public Interest Oversight Board.

== Academic career ==
Thomadakis was born in Athens, Greece. He was educated at Yale University, obtaining a B.A. in economics, and at the MIT Sloan School of Management, where he obtained a master's degree and Ph.D. in Financial Economics. For many years he held professorships at Baruch College, City University of New York and the MIT Sloan School of Management. He became professor of financial economics at the University of Athens.

He was married to Angeliki Laiou, a Harvard professor who was a scholar of the Byzantine Empire, and the second woman to be named a permanent member of the Academy of Athens since the organization was founded in 1926. They were later divorced.

== Public positions ==
Stavros Thomadakis served as a member of the Monetary Committee of the European Community and a Director of the European Investment Bank and of the Commercial Bank of Greece. He served as a member of the Greek Council of Economic Advisers, Economic Counselor of the Hellenic Banks Association and Chairman of the Greek Center of Planning and Economic Research. He was chairman of the Capital Market Commission of Greece from 1996 to 2004. He was chairman of the Expert Group on Market Abuse of the Committee of European Securities Regulators (CESR), and was also chairman of the European Regional Committee of IOSCO for four years.

The Public Interest Oversight Board (PIOB) was established after a series of corporate scandals, including the collapse of Enron and WorldCom in the United States and of Parmalat in Europe, led to demand for an independent body to oversee auditors and to ensure that audit standards are in the public interest. The board was formally established on 28 February 2005, and Thomadakis was appointed its first chairman. Speaking at the launch of the PIOB, Thomadakis said: "The creation of the PIOB is a landmark in the cooperation of world regulatory organizations for the oversight of international standard-setting for auditors. The project of the PIOB is ambitious and represents a novelty for world-level public oversight. Success for the PIOB will mean quality, stability, and integrity in companies and world markets".

== Bibliography ==
Some selected publications:

- Stavros Thomadakis (1984). A Sample of Exchange Discounts by the National Bank of Greece (1859–1888). Athens. p. 80.
- Michael Storper; Stavros Thomadakis; Lena Tsipouri (1998). Latecomers in the Global Economy. Taylor and Francis. ISBN 0-203-97924-9.
- Stavros Thomadakis (1995). Dynamic effects in Greek manufacturing: the changing shares of SMEs, 1983–1990. Centre of Planning and Economic Research.
- Stavros Thomadakis; Christos Panagiotis Nouni; Dimitrios Gounopoulos (July 26, 2007). "Long Term Performance of Greek IPOs". European Financial Management Journal. SSRN 1002968.
