= Assassination of Nikos Temponeras =

1991 political murder in Patras, Greece

Nikos Temponeras
- Νίκος Τεμπονέρας
- Born: 1954
- Died: January 8, 1991 (aged 36–37); Patras, Greece
- Cause of death: Blunt force trauma to the head via iron bar
- Occupation: Mathematics teacher

Nikos Temponeras (1954 – January 8, 1991) was a high school mathematics teacher, and a member of the left-wing Labour Anti-imperialistic Front (EAM). Temponeras was murdered in Patras during the student protests of 1990–1991 by Giannis Kalampokas, a municipal councillor and president of the local New Democracy branch.

== Background ==
In late 1990 and 1991, student demonstrations occurred throughout Greece in opposition to an education bill proposed by Minister of Education Vassilis Kontogiannopoulos of the conservative New Democracy government. Among other things the bill included disciplinary control of students' lives outside of school, enforcement of mandatory school uniforms and abolition of social (free food and accommodation) provisions to financially weak university students. A popular measure of demonstration was the occupation of schools and universities by the students.

== Assassination ==
The murderer was a municipal councilor and the president of the local branch of Youth Organization of New Democracy (ONNED), Giannis Kalampokas. The murder occurred on January 8, 1991, when Kalampokas hit Temponeras in the head with an iron bar while ONNED was trying to recapture the school complex of 3rd and 7th Patras high schools (where Temponeras was a teacher) that was occupied by the students. In order to take control of the school, the members of ONNED, led by Kalampokas, made an attack with bats, iron bars and cement tiles against the occupiers of the school that were supported by many parents and teachers, including Temponeras.

== Aftermath ==
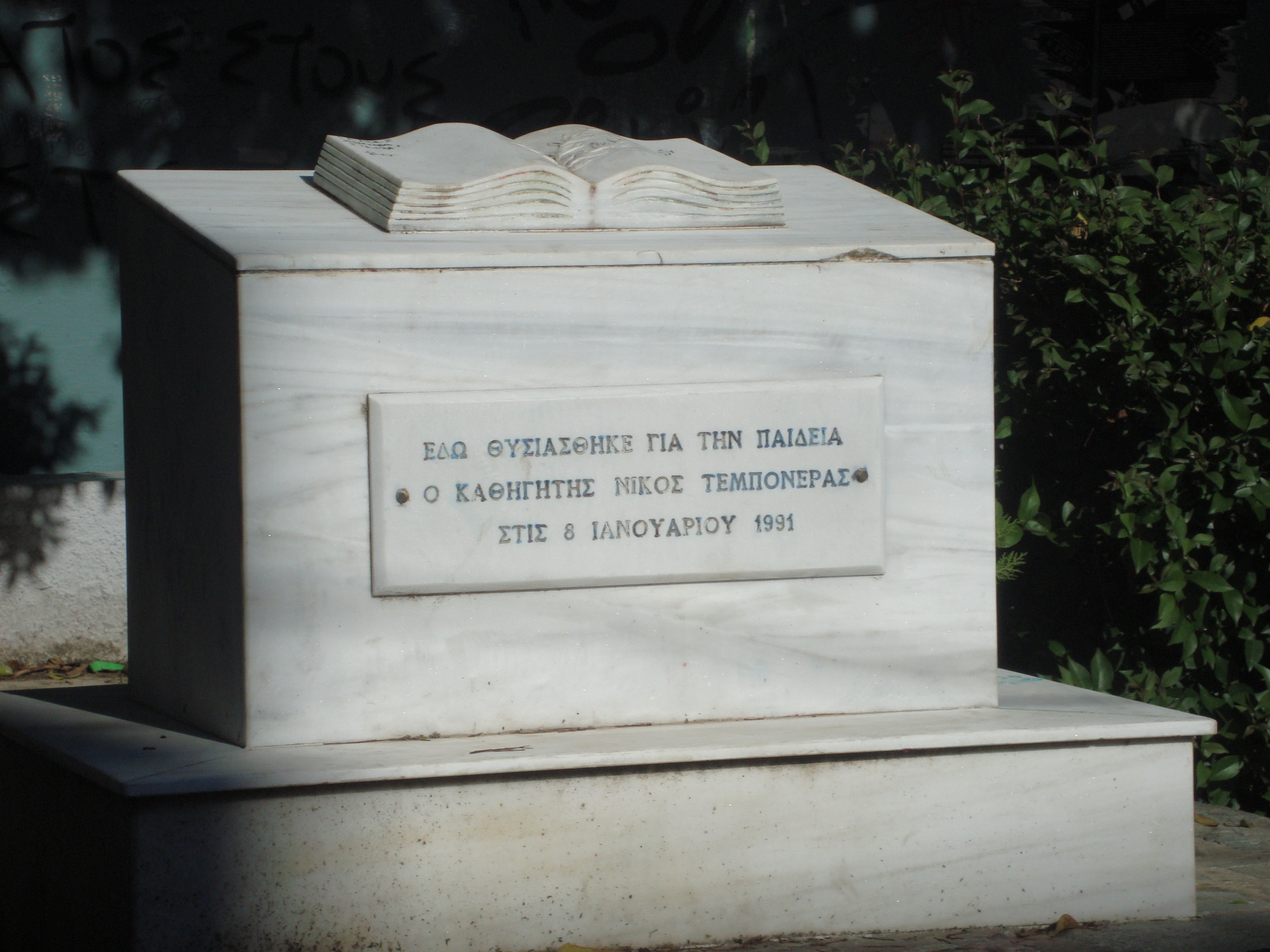
A monument in honor of Nikos Temponeras, outside of the 3rd Lyceum of Patras

The assassination, occurring in a period of fierce political confrontation, sparkled a wave of protests throughout Greece. During these protests another four people died in Athens, due to a fire caused by a tear gas agent thrown by the riot police. The day after the murder, the Minister of Education Kontogiannopoulos resigned and the most controversial articles of the bill were removed.

Kalampokas was tried and sentenced to life in prison for murder but later his sentence was reduced to 17 years and 3 months in prison and finally to 16 years and 9 months. He was released on February 2, 1998.

The school complex where the murder occurred was named after Nikos Temponeras.
