= George Zanias =

Greek economist and politician

Georgios Zanias Γιώργος Ζανιάς

Minister of Finance
- In office 17 May 2012 – 5 July 2012
- Prime Minister: Panagiotis Pikrammenos; Antonis Samaras
- Preceded by: Filippos Sachinidis
- Succeeded by: Yannis Stournaras

Personal details
- Born: 16 August 1955 (age 71) Orchomenus, Greece
- Party: Independent
- Education: Athens University of Economics and Business; University of Reading; University of Oxford

Georgios P. Zanias (Greek: Γιώργος Π. Ζανιάς, pronounced [ˈʝorɣos zaˈɲas], born 16 August 1955 in Orchomenus) was briefly Minister of Finance in Greece from May to July 2012. In June 2012 he was due to be replaced by Vassilis Rapanos. Instead, he was replaced by economist Yiannis Stournaras.

Zanias was one of the chief negotiators of the bailout of Greece in 2011-2012.

== Career ==
Zanias is Professor of Economics at the Athens University of Economics and Business where he served as Chair of the Department of International and European Economic Studies. He has previously held academic posts at the Universities of Oxford, Crete, and the Agricultural University of Athens.

He graduated from the Athens University of Economics and Business with a B.Sc. in Economics and received his master's degree from the University of Reading in England and his Ph.D. in Economics from Oxford University.

== Appointments ==
Zanias has held many positions in the Greek government, and served as Minister of Finance in the Caretaker Cabinet of Panagiotis Pikrammenos.

Previously, Zanias served as the General Secretary of the Ministry of Economy and Finance in 2001-2004, Chairman and Scientific Director of the Centre of Planning and Economic Research, Chairman of the Council of Economic Advisers of the Ministry of Economy and Finance, Member of the Executive Board of the Hellenic Exchanges. He has served as an expert to the World Bank, the European Commission and the United Nations.

Political offices
Preceded by Filippos Sachinidis	Minister of Finance; 2012	Succeeded by Yannis Stournaras
