= Efthymios Christodoulou =

Greek economist and banker

- Ευθύμιος Χριστοδούλου
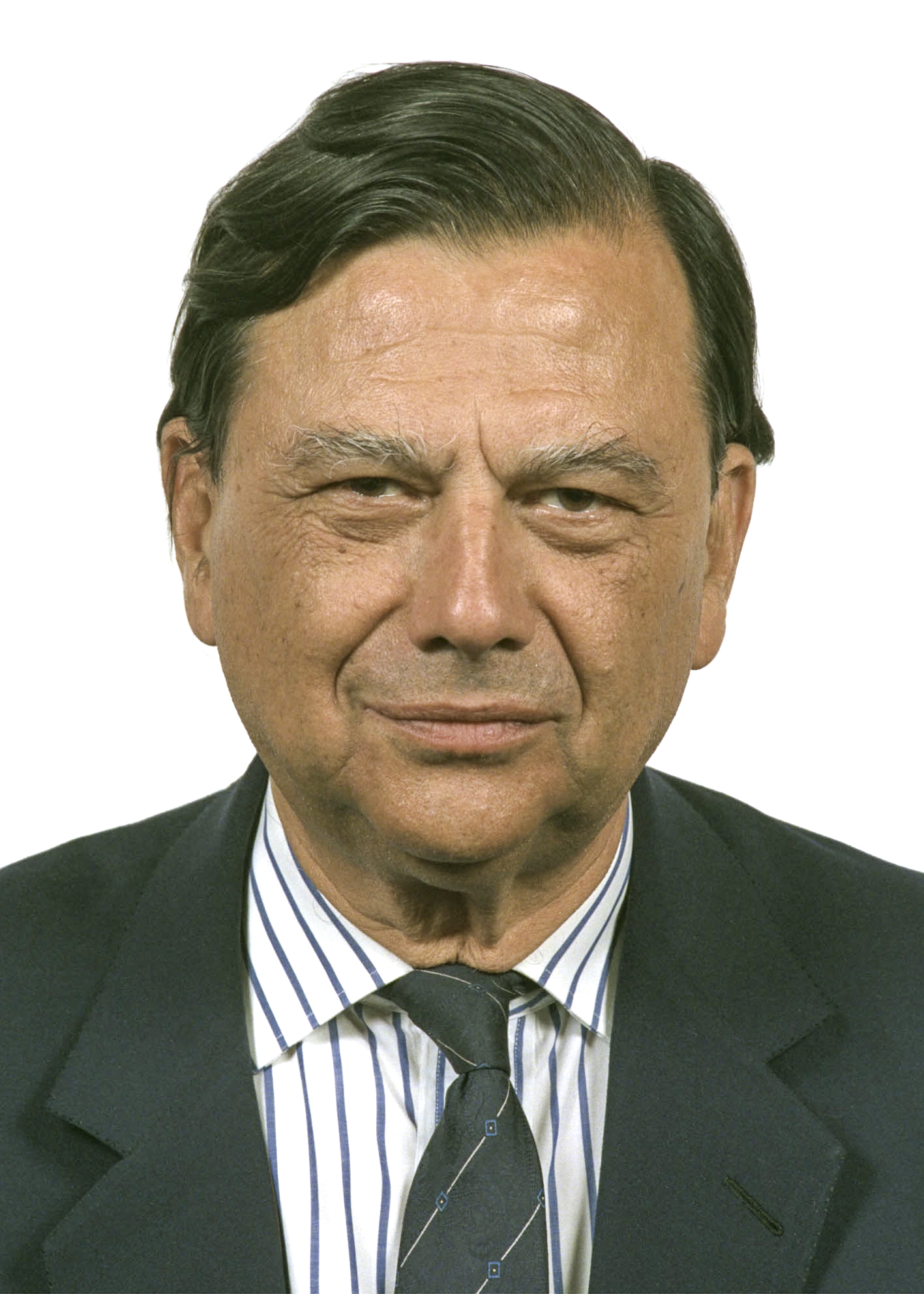
- Christodoulou in 1994

Governor of the Bank of Greece
- In office 1991–1993

Governor of the National Bank of Greece
- In office 1979–1981

Personal details
- Born: 1932 (age 93–94) Larissa, Greece
- Party: New Democracy
- Education: Athens College; Hamilton College; Columbia University

Efthymios N. Christodoulou (Greek: Ευθύμιος Ν. Χριστοδούλου; born 1932) is a Greek economist and banker.

== Biography ==
Christodoulou was born in 1932 in Larissa. He holds a degree from Athens College, a B.A. in Economics from Hamilton College, and a M.A in Economics from Columbia University. Christodoulou has served as Director General of the National Investment Bank for Industrial Development (ETEBA), Executive Chairman of the Board of Olympic Airways, Governor of the National Bank of Greece (1979-1981), President of the Greek Union of Banks, and Governor of the Bank of Greece (1992-1993). He has also been Governor for Greece at the World Bank and the IMF.

A member of the centre-right New Democracy, Christodoulou has been elected a member of the European Parliament (General Rapporteur for the E.E.C. budget, head of the Greek delegation for New Democracy party, 1984-1990 and 1994-1999). He has also served as the alternate Minister for Foreign Affairs and Minister of National Economy.

From 2004 to 2009 he was Executive Chairman of Hellenic Petroleum S.A. From 2010 to 2013, Christodoulou has been a board member of European Financial Group EFG (Luxembourg) SA, the operating holding company of EFG Group and served as Chairman of the Board of Eurobank. Christodoulou is an International Advisor of Goldman Sachs. Efthymios Christodoulou is married and has three children.
