= Public Interest Oversight Board =

International oversight organization

- Formation: 28 February 2005; 21 years ago
- Type: Regulatory body
- Purpose: Ensure that accountancy standards are in the public interest
- Headquarters: Madrid, Spain
- Official language: English
- Website: http://www.ipiob.org/

The Public Interest Oversight Board (PIOB) is an international body that oversees the International Federation of Accountants (IFAC) and seeks to improve the quality and public interest focus of the IFAC standards in the areas of audit, education, and ethics.

== Formation ==
Creation of the PIOB in 2005 was triggered by a series of corporate scandals including the collapse of Enron and WorldCom in the United States and of Parmalat in Europe. These undermined public confidence in the conduct and competence of audit practitioners, leading to demand for an overhaul of the IFAC including an independent oversight body to ensure that all standards are in the public interest.

The board was established through a collaborative effort by members of the international financial regulatory community, working with IFAC, led by Michel Prada, Chairman of the French Financial Markets Authority and Deputy Chairman of the International Organization of Securities Commissions (IOSCO) Technical Committee. The first chairman was Stavros Thomadakis, a professor of finance at the University of Athens who was formerly chairman of the Hellenic Capital Market Commission. The new board was welcomed by regulatory bodies such as the Financial Reporting Council (FRC) of the United Kingdom.

== Activities ==
The PIOB oversees the public interest activities of three independent standard-setting boards supported by IFAC: the International Auditing and Assurance Standards Board (IAASB), the International Accounting Education Standards Board (IAESB) and the International Ethics Standards Board for Accountants (IESBA). The PIOB also oversees the IFAC's Compliance Advisory Panel, which evaluates member body compliance with IFAC Statements of Membership Obligations. The Chair of the PIOB has the right to attend and to speak at IFAC Board meetings.

== Oversight ==
The PIOB is accountable to the Monitoring Group, which is composed of the International Organization of Securities Commissions, the Basel Committee on Banking Supervision, the International Association of Insurance Supervisors, the World Bank, the European Commission, the Financial Stability Board and the International Forum of Independent Audit Regulators. The first four organizations nominate the eight members of the board, while the European Commission nominates two observers to the board.
