= George Petalotis =

Greek politician

George S. Petalotis
- Γεώργιος Σ. Πεταλωτής
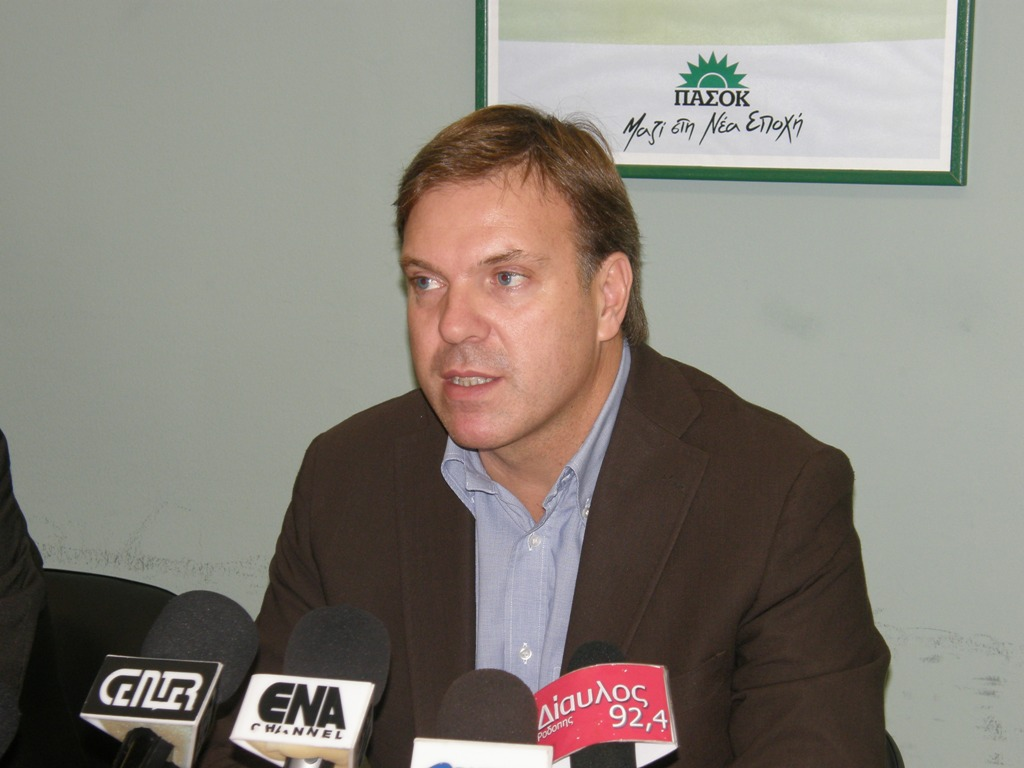

Deputy Minister for Justice, Transparency and Human Rights
- In office 17 June 2011 – 17 May 2012
- Prime Minister: George Papandreou; Lucas Papademos

Deputy Minister to the Prime Minister and Government Spokesman
- In office 7 October 2009 – 17 June 2011
- Prime Minister: George Papandreou
- Preceded by: Evangelos Antonaros
- Succeeded by: Angelos Tolkas (deputy minister); Elias Mossialos (gov't spokesman)

Personal details
- Born: 11 March 1964 (age 62) Komotini, Greece
- Party: Movement of Democratic Socialists (2015-2017), PASOK (until 2015)
- Other political affiliations: Movement for Change
- Spouse: Kleopatra A. Stogiannidou
- Children: one daughter
- Education: Aristotle University of Thessaloniki, Democritus University of Thrace, University of Heidelberg
- Profession: Attorney
- Website: www.gpetalotis.gr

George S. Petalotis (Greek: Γεώργιος Σ. Πεταλωτής, born 11 March 1964 in Komotini, Greece) is a Greek politician of the Movement of Democratic Socialists. Under the former Greek prime minister George Papandreou he served as government spokesman and as Deputy Minister for Justice, Transparency and Human Rights.

== Life ==
=== Early life ===
Petalotis graduated from the Law School of the Aristotle University of Thessaloniki. He continued his studies in the Law School of the Democritus University of Thrace, obtaining a Ph.D. in Penal and Criminal Science.

He completed his academic studies in the University of Heidelberg, Germany, with a Major of Sciences in Legal Terminology, Language and Culture.

=== Professional career ===
In 1993, Petalotis became a member of the bar association of the Rhodope Prefecture, and was elected as the body's president in 1998. He remained active until 2002, when he quit his position to undertake responsibilities in the coordinating committee of the plenary of presidents of the bar associations of Greece. In 2005, he was re-elected as a president of the bar association of the Rhodope Prefecture.

Petalotis was the first correspondent of the Greek Council for Refugees, in cooperation with the corresponding United Nations High Commission for Refugees.

=== Political career ===
In 2007, Petalotis was elected on the list of the Panhellenic Socialist Movement (PASOK) to represent the Rhodope constituency in the Hellenic Parliament. After the 2009 election, Petalotis was appointed Deputy Minister to the Prime Minister and Government Spokesman. From 17 June 2011 until the May 2012 election, he was Deputy Minister for Justice, Transparency and Human Rights.

On 3 January 2015, it was announced that Petalotis would join former prime minister Papandreou in leaving PASOK to found the new Movement of Democratic Socialists. Petalotis and Filippos Sachinidis were appointed the media representatives of the new party.
