= Movement of Democratic Socialists =

Greek political party

Movement of Democratic Socialists Κίνημα Δημοκρατών Σοσιαλιστών
- President: George Papandreou
- Spokesperson: George Petalotis; Philippos Sachinidis
- Founder: George Papandreou
- Founded: 3 January 2015
- Dissolved: 29 March 2026
- Split from: Panhellenic Socialist Movement
- Merged into: PASOK – Movement for Change
- Ideology: Social democracy
- Political position: Centre-left
- National affiliation: Democratic Alignment (2017); PASOK – Movement for Change (2017–2026)

The Movement of Democratic Socialists (Greek: Κίνημα Δημοκρατών Σοσιαλιστών, romanized: Kínima Dimokratón Sosialistón) was a political party in Greece established on 3 January 2015 by George Papandreou after splitting from the Panhellenic Socialist Movement (PASOK). The party officially used To Kinima (Το Κίνημα, "The Movement") as the party's name abbreviation, although several media outlets and opinion pollsters have referred to it using the acronym KIDISO (ΚΙΔΗΣΟ).

From 2017 to 2026 it was a component of PASOK – Movement for Change. Following the amalgamation of PASOK – Movement for Change into a unitary party, the KIDISO has merged into the new party.

== History ==
=== Formation ===
The foundation of a new centre-left political party was announced on 2 January 2015 by George Papandreou, outgoing Member of the Hellenic Parliament and former Prime Minister of Greece, three weeks before the upcoming election to be held on 25 January. This confirmed Papandreou's split from the Panhellenic Socialist Movement (PASOK), which he had led until being replaced as leader by Evangelos Venizelos in March 2012. PASOK officials immediately denounced Papandreou's move as an "unethical and irrational political act", accusing Papandreou of fracturing PASOK and being motivated by personal ambition.

On 3 January 2015, KIDISO was officially founded in the auditorium of the Benaki Museum in Athens. Five PASOK MPs joined the new party, including Papandreou and former minister Filippos Sachinidis, who would serve as the party’s media representative alongside former deputy minister George Petalotis. Other well known PASOK politicians who joined KIDISO include former parliamentary speaker Filippos Petsalnikos and former minister Dimitris Reppas.

A 16-page founding declaration, signed by 252 founding members criticised the economic policies of the European institutions, supported the adoption of Eurobonds, and called for a "progressive, socialist, ecological Europe".

=== 2015–2026 ===
In the January 2015 legislative election, KIDISO received 2.46% of the national vote, thus failing to cross the 3% threshold to receive seats in the Hellenic Parliament.

On 27 August 2015, PASOK officially ruled out a proposed electoral pact with KIDISO for the upcoming September 2015 snap election. On 2 September 2015, Papandreou stated that financial restrictions meant that KIDISO had ruled out contesting the election.

On 12 January 2017, Papandreou and PASOK leader Fofi Gennimata announced that KIDISO was joining the Democratic Alignment.

KIDISO later joined the Movement for Change (KINAL) together with PASOK, DIMAR and To Potami. Two party members, leader George Papandreou and former PASOK minister Haris Kastanidis, were among the 22 KINAL MPs elected in 2019. As a result of the decision by Nikos Androulakis to exercise his prerogative as party leader to retain the single Thessaloniki A seat won by PASOK–KINAL in the May 2023 and June 2023 elections, Haris Kastanidis is no longer a member of parliament.

== Election results ==
=== Hellenic Parliament ===
Election	Hellenic Parliament					Rank	Government	Leader
Election	Votes	%	±pp	Seats won	+/−	Rank	Government	Leader
Jan 2015	152,557	2.47%	New	0 / 300	New	8th	Extra-parliamentary	George Papandreou
