= George Provopoulos =

Greek economist (1950–2024)

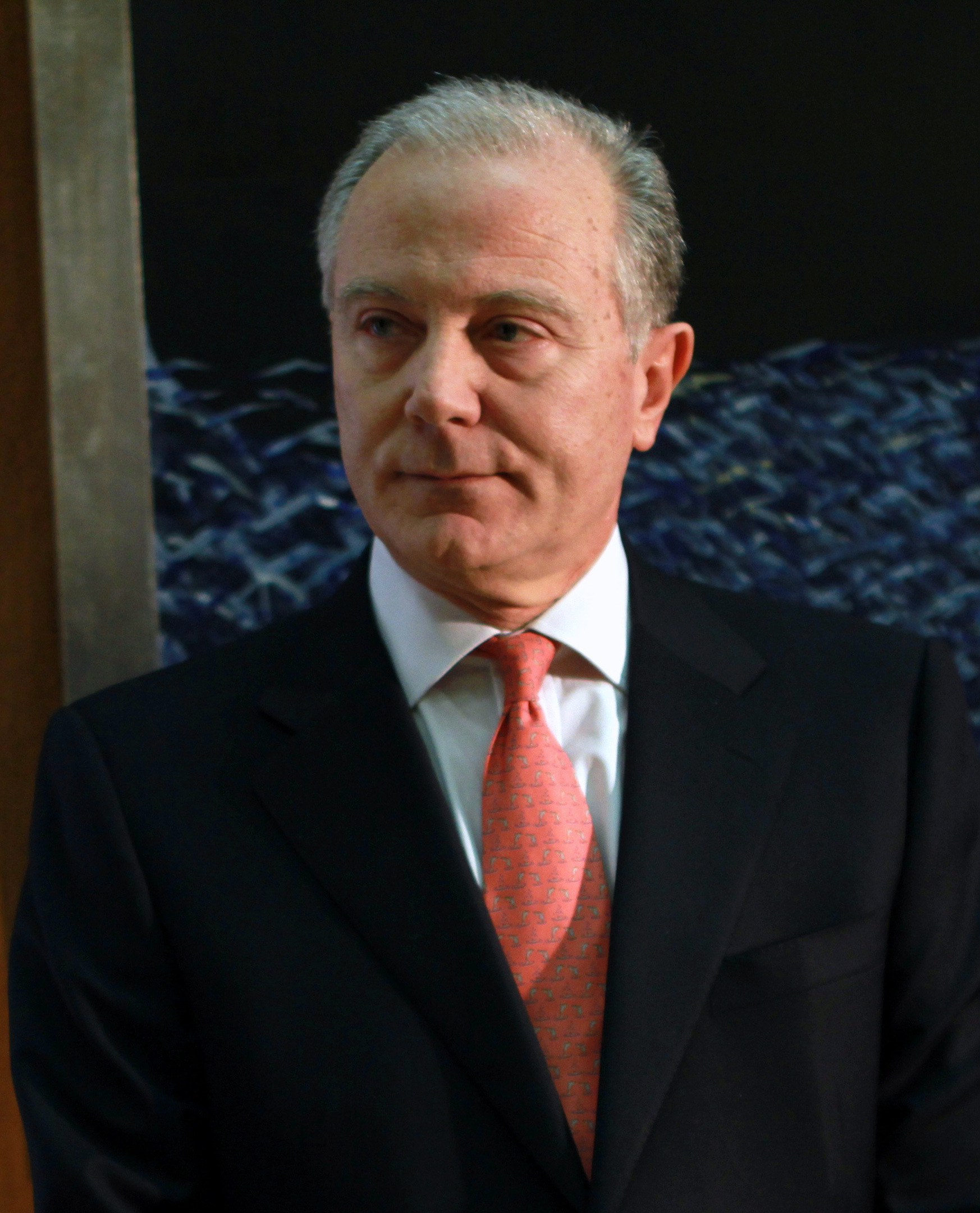

George Provopoulos (Greek: Γεώργιος Προβόπουλος; 20 April 1950 – 28 May 2024) was a Greek economist who was the Governor of the Bank of Greece from 2008 to 2014, and was a member of the European Central Bank's Governing Council. Prior to his appointment as Central Bank Head, he was a professor at the University of Athens.

== Early life and education ==
Provopoulos was born in Piraeus and obtained his Bachelor's Degree in Economics at the University of Athens, and his MA and PhD in Economics at the University of Essex on a UK Government Scholarship.

== Career ==
Early in his career, Provopoulos was chairman and CEO at Emporiki Bank, Greece's fifth-largest lender, where he oversaw the bank's acquisition to Credit Agricole in 2006. He later served as CEO at Piraeus Bank.

As the country's central bank chief during the Greek government-debt crisis, Provopoulos presided over efforts to avert the collapse of Greece's banking system amid fears the country would abolish the euro.

== Death ==
Provopoulos died of cancer on 28 May 2024, at the age of 74.
