= Vassilis Rapanos =

Greek economist (born 1947)

Vassilis Rapanos (Greek: Βασίλης Ράπανος; born 1947) is a Greek economist.

== Early life and education ==
Rapanos was born on the island of Kos in 1947. He received his bachelor's degree from the Athens University of Economics and Business in 1975 and a doctorate from Queen's University at Kingston in 1982.

== Early experience ==
During the Regime of the Colonels, Rapanos was imprisoned for more than four years for participating in left-wing resistance against the military regime. He is a former economics professor in the Department of Economics at the University of Athens. He also served as financial advisor to then prime minister Costas Simitis from 2000 to 2004 and to the Greek delegations to the European Union and the OECD. He was also chairman of the Council of Economic Advisers during this period. He also served in the Economy Ministry at the period when Greece joined the euro in 2001. He served as chairman of the Hellenic Telecommunications Organization from 1998 to 2000. He was also firstly deputy governor and then governor the National Mortgage Bank of Greece. He worked as a research associate with the Institute of Economic and Industrial Research (IOBE) from 2007 to 2009. He has been non-executive chairman of the Hellenic Bank Association and chairman of the board of the National Bank of Greece since 2009.

On 16 August 2016, Rapanos was elected member of the Academy of Athens.

== Minister of Finance (designate) ==
Rapanos was offered the position of Finance Minister on 20 June 2012 and was due to replace Georgios Zanias on 23 June 2012. However, because of illness he was rushed to hospital before he could be sworn in and on 25 June 2012 informed the Prime Minister that he would be unable to fully and efficiently exercise the duties of Finance Minister.

== Personal life ==
Rapanos is reported by Greek media to have had a history of health problems, including cancer.
