= Youth Organisation of New Democracy =

Greek political youth organization

Youth Organisation of New Democracy Οργάνωση Νέων Νέας Δημοκρατίας
- Chairman: Orfeas Georgiou
- Vice-Chairman: Panagiotis Lebesis; Ioannis Fytopoulos
- Founded: October 1974
- Ideology: Conservative liberalism
- Mother party: New Democracy
- International affiliation: International Young Democrat Union
- European affiliation: Youth of the European People's Party
- Website: onned.gr

The Youth Organisation of New Democracy (Greek: Οργάνωση Νέων Νέας Δημοκρατίας, ΟΝΝΕΔ) is the youth organisation of the centre-right liberal Greek political party New Democracy. It was founded in 1974 by young members of New Democracy.

== Universities and schools ==
In universities and technical colleges the members of the Youth Organisation of New Democracy participate in DAP-NDFK (Renewing Democratic Leadership - New Democratic Student Movement) and in schools in MAKI.

== Assassination of Nikos Temponeras ==
During the 1990–1991 student protests against an education bill of New Democracy, ONNED members attacked an occupied school in Patras and Giannis Kalampokas (president of the local branch of ONNED) killed the leftist teacher Nikos Temponeras that supported the occupation of the school (and who was against the education bill in question).

== Well-known chairpersons ==
- Anastasios Papaligouras (1976–1977)
- Vasilis Michaloliakos (1982–1984)
- Vangelis Meimarakis (1984–1987)
- Georgios Voulgarakis (1987–1989)
- Kostis Chatzidakis (1992–1994)
- Evripidis Stylianidis (1994–1995)
- Andreas Papamimikos (2010–2013)
- Sakis Ioannidis (2013–2016)
- Kostas Dervos (2016–2019)
- Pavlos Marinakis (2019–2022)
- Orfeas Georgiou (2022–present)
