= Hellenic Capital Market Commission =

Coordinates: 37°58′38″N 23°44′1″E

Hellenic Capital Market Commission Επιτροπή Κεφαλαιαγοράς

Agency overview
- Formed: 1927
- Type: Financial regulatory body
- Jurisdiction: Greece
- Headquarters: Athens, Greece
- Agency executive: Charalampos Gotsis, (Chairman)
- Website: http://www.hcmc.gr/

The Hellenic Capital Market Commission (HCMC; Greek: Επιτροπή Κεφαλαιαγοράς), established as a legal entity by Greek Law in 1991 and organized by the Greek Law 2324 of 1995, aims to "ensure the protection and the orderly and efficient operation of the capital market, which is crucial for the growth of the national economy" of Greece. According to Thomson Reuters HCMC is the competent authority for supervising securities laws in Greece, including tender offers.

Whereas it is governed under a national framework of accountability, the HCMC increasingly implements policies set at the European Union level. It is a voting member of the Board of Supervisors of the European Securities and Markets Authority (ESMA). It is also a member of the European Systemic Risk Board (ESRB).

== History ==
Article 12 of Mandatory Law 148/1967 established the Hellenic Capital Market Commission as a body within the Ministry of Economic Coordination. Article 76 of Law 1969/91 created the Hellenic Capital Market Commission as an independent legal entity governed by public law and supervised by the Minister of National Economy. The same legislation designated the new HCMC as "universal successor" of the ministerial commission that had been established in 1967. The HCMC was reorganized by Law 2324/1995.

== Mandate ==
The commission is responsible for monitoring compliance with the provisions of capital market law, and is funded by fees paid by the supervised entities. These include Investment Firms, Mutual Fund Management Firms, Portfolio Investment Companies, Real Estate Investment Companies and Financial Intermediation Firms. The HCMC also oversees companies listed on the Athens Stock Exchange, ensuring compliance with capital market legislation. Because of problems caused by the financial crisis that blew up in mid 2010, the commission banned short selling of shares listed in the Athens Exchange effective 28 April 2010, to remain in force until 28 June 2010.

== Legal framework ==
Until 2000, there were no laws covering corporate governance in Greece. The HCMC set up the Committee on Corporate Governance in April 1999, which issued the Mertzanis Report in October 1999, entitled Principles on Corporate Governance in Greece: Recommendations for its Competitive Transformation. This functioned as a voluntary code. In November 2000 the HCMC issued the mandatory Code of Conduct for Companies Listed on the Athens Stock Exchange, which requires listed entities to establish an internal audit unit to monitor the company's audit process, reporting to the board of directors. Law No. 3016 of 2002 regulating corporate governance went into force on 20 June 2003, and allows the HCMC to impose sanctions for non-compliance, but the law has been criticized for lacking detail.

The chairman of the commission from 1996 to 2004 was Stavros Thomadakis, who went on to become first chairman of the Public Interest Oversight Board in March 2005. As of June 2011 the chairman was Anastassios Gabrielides.

== See also ==
- List of financial supervisory authorities by country
