= University of Piraeus =

University located in Piraeus, Athens, Greece

Coordinates: 37°56′30.10″N 23°39′10.92″E

- Πανεπιστήμιο Πειραιώς
- Type: Public higher education institution
- Established: 1938; 88 years ago
- Rector: Michail Sfakianakis
- Undergraduates: 26,877 (registered); 10,360 (active)
- Postgraduates: 5,444
- Location: Piraeus, Greece
- Website: www.unipi.gr

University of Piraeus (UniPi; Greek: Πανεπιστήμιο Πειραιώς, abbr. ΠΑΠΕΙ) is a Greek public university located in Piraeus, Greece with a total of ten academic departments focused mainly on Business Management, Computer science, Economics, Finance and Maritime Studies.

It is the second-oldest university in Greece that specializes in the fields of economics and business after the Athens University of Economics and Business, while the Department of Banking and Financial Management is the country's oldest academic department in the area of finance.

== History ==
The university was founded in 1938 by the Industrialists and Tradesmen Association under the name "School for Industrial Studies" and its original aim was the advanced training of managerial executives. In 1945, it was renamed to the "Higher School for Industrial Studies", while in 1958 it was renamed again as the "Graduate School for Industrial Studies" and its seat was established in Piraeus. Since then the university has evolved from its original sole focus on business management and added additional academic fields, such as economics, finance, maritime studies, informatics, and statistics. In 1966, it became a public university, and in 1989, it received its present name.

== Academic structure ==
Each of the following 10 departments offer undergraduate programmes with a corresponding four-year Bachelor of Science (B.Sc.) degree upon completion.

School of Economics, Business and International Studies (est. 2013)	Department of Economics (est. 1971); Department of Business Administration (est. 1971); Department of International and European Studies (est. 2000); Department of Tourism Studies (est. 2017)
School of Finance and Statistics (est. 2013)	Department of Banking and Financial Management (est. 1989); Department of Statistics and Insurance Science (est. 1982)
School of Maritime and Industrial Studies (est. 2013)	Department of Maritime Studies (est. 1989); Department of Industrial Management and Technology (est. 1991)
School of Information and Communication Technologies (est. 2013)	Department of Informatics (est. 1992); Department of Digital Systems (est. 1999)

== Postgraduate studies ==
The university is one of the two public universities in Greece that offer an Executive M.B.A. programme. Additionally, there are numerous postgraduate programmes that offer an M.B.A. or a M.Sc. degree upon completion, such as in Actuarial Science and Risk Management, Accounting, Finance, Banking, Maritime Economics, Business Administration, Marketing, Applied Statistics, Economic and Business Strategy, ICT and so on.

The University of Piraeus' Department of International and European Studies, offers two postgraduate programmes (Master of Science - MSc) taught in English language titled American Studies: Politics, Strategy and Economics and Energy: Strategy, Law and Economics.

== Research and openness ==
The institution is home to the University of Piraeus Research Center (UPRC) which was founded in 1989.

In addition, many cooperation agreements under the Erasmus +, as well as other bilateral cooperation agreements and inter-university provided, exchange of students and staff, exchange of teaching and research material and conduct joint research projects and conferences. Moreover, the university is a member of international organizations such as European University Association, AACSB, International Association of Universities, etc.

The University of Piraeus signed a cooperation protocol with the Hellenic Chamber of Hotels on 26 July 2022 with the aim of the joint action of possibilities of two parts to the promotion of their purposes. It also has made a cooperation agreement with the Piraeus Chamber of Commerce and Industry on 11 April 2023 where with the Quantitative Analysis in Shipping of the University of Piraeus co-organised a conference on the topic Ports, Transport and Logistics – New Skills and Modern Experiential Education, where more than 100 companies expressed interest, with most of them signing the cooperation.

== Academic evaluation ==
In 2016 the external evaluation committee gave University of Piraeus a Positive evaluation.

An external evaluation of all academic departments in Greek universities was conducted by the Hellenic Quality Assurance and Accreditation Agency (HQA) in 2008–2014.

== Governance ==
The university is managed by the Rectorial Council and the Senate.

The Senate consists of the rector, the two vice-rectors, the departments' chairpersons, one representative from each department's student body, two representatives from the postgraduate students and special postgraduate scholars, one representative from the assistant tutors and scientific contributors, one representative from the special teaching staff, one representative from the administrative staff, and one representative from the special administrative technical staff. There are also representatives of the associate professors, the assistant professors and the lecturers.

== Notable alumni ==
- Nasser Al-Khelaifi, businessman, president of Paris Saint-Germain.
- George Kotsimpos, fitness athlete, achieved six Guinness World Records in the world of physical fitness.
- Spyridon Kapnisis, chess player. He was awarded the title of chess grandmaster in 2011.
- Filippos Sachinidis, politician; briefly served as Minister of Finance.
- Eva Kaili, politician who served as one of the fourteen vice presidents of the European Parliament.
- Sakis (Dionysios) Karagiorgas, economist and Greek Junta resistant. Served as Panteion University academic professor rector.

=== Notable professors ===
- Gikas Hardouvelis, economist and former senior government official serving as chairman of the Board of Directors of the National Bank of Greece.
- Nikos Kotzias, politician and diplomat who served as Minister for Foreign Affairs from 2015 to 2018.

== See also ==
- List of universities in Greece
- List of research institutes in Greece
- European Higher Education Area
- Education in Greece
- Open access in Greece
