= Bank of Greece =

Central Bank of Greece

Bank of Greece Τράπεζα της Ελλάδος

- Head office in Athens
- Central bank of: Greece
- Headquarters: Athens, Greece
- Coordinates: 37.978611°N 23.733333°E
- Established: 14 May 1928; 98 years ago
- Ownership: e-E.F.K.A. Electronic National Social Security Entity (12.44%); Hellenic Public Sector (8.93%)
- Governor: Yannis Stournaras
- Reserves: 4 070 million USD
- Succeeded by: European Central Bank (2001)^{1}
- Website: www.bankofgreece.gr
- ^{1} The Bank of Greece still exists but many functions have been taken over by the ECB.

The Bank of Greece (Greek: Τράπεζα της Ελλάδος Trapeza tis Ellados, abbr. ΤτΕ) is the national central bank for Greece within the Eurosystem. It was the Greek central bank from 1927 to 2000, issuing the drachma.

Unusually among contemporary central banks, the Bank of Greece still has private shareholders and its stock is listed on the Athens Exchange.

In addition to its monetary role, the Bank of Greece is also a financial supervisory authority. In that capacity, it increasingly implements policies set at the European Union level. It is the national competent authority for Greece within European Banking Supervision. It is a voting member of the respective Boards of Supervisors of the European Banking Authority (EBA) and European Insurance and Occupational Pensions Authority (EIOPA). It is Greece's designated National Resolution Authority and plenary session member of the Single Resolution Board (SRB). It provides the permanent single common representative for Greece in the Supervisory composition of the General Board of the Anti-Money Laundering Authority (AMLA). It is also a member of the European Systemic Risk Board (ESRB).

== History ==
The Bank of Greece was established by Law 3424/7 December 1927, under the conditions of the stabilization loan coordinated by the Economic and Financial Organization of the League of Nations, and its operations started officially in 1928. The shares of the Bank of Greece are registered and have been listed on the Athens Exchange since June 12, 1930.

During the Axis occupation of Greece (1941–44), Governor Kyriakos Varvaresos and Deputy Governor Georgios Mantzavinos followed the Greek government in exile to London. The collaborationist governments in Greece fired Varvaresos and Mantzavinos in 1941 and appointed first Miltiadis Negrepontis as Governing Counsellor (April 24, 1941 – July 3, 1941), then Dimitrios Santis as Governor (July 3, 1941 – January 20, 1943) and Andreas Papadimitriou as Deputy Governor (July 3, 1941 – November 18, 1941), and finally Theodoros Tourkovasilis as Governor (April 19, 1943 – April 13, 1944) and Spyridon Hatzikyriakos as Deputy Governor (April 5, 1943 – October 5, 1944). After the liberation, all dismissals and appointments by occupation-era governments concerning members of the administration of the Bank of Greece were declared null and void.

Until January 2001 (when Greece adopted the euro) the bank was responsible for the former national currency, the drachma. Greece had failed to meet the membership criteria and was excluded from participating when the euro was launched on 1 January 1999. Use of physical drachma notes and coins continued until 31 December 2001, as denominations of the euro.

== Operations ==
The bank has a staff of more than 1,800 employees. Its primary objective is to ensure price stability in Greece. It also supervises the private banks and acts as a treasurer and fiscal agent for the Greek government. Since law 3867/2010 was passed the Bank of Greece is also responsible for supervising private insurance companies, merging with the Committee for the Supervision of Insurance Companies established by law 3229/2004.

Its Euro banknotes printer identification code is Y. The Bank of Greece also sells gold sovereigns.

== Legal status and ownership ==
The Bank of Greece is a joint-stock company with special privileges, special restrictions, and duties. It is prohibited from operating as a commercial bank.

The percentage of shares under Greek state ownership cannot exceed 35 percent (initially this limit was 10 percent). As of early 2024, the government share was slightly over 21 percent, of which 8.9 percent directly held by the Greek state and 12.4 percent through the National Social Security Fund. The rest of the bank's equity was widely dispersed, with no single shareholder known to hold more than 1 percent.

== Leadership ==
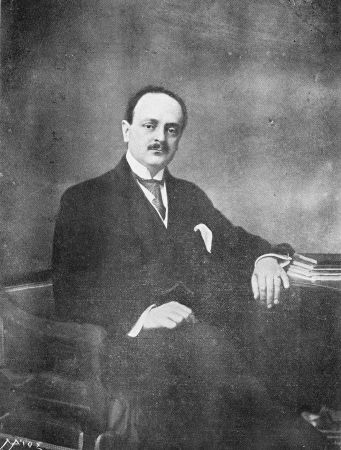
Alexandros Diomidis (1875-1950) was the first governor of the Bank of Greece

=== Governors ===
The chief officer of the Bank of Greece is the Governor (Greek: διοικητής, IPA: [ðiiciˈtis]), a governmental appointee.

Officeholder	Entered office	Left office	Notes
Alexandros Diomidis	April 21, 1928	September 29, 1931	Prime Minister 1949–50
Emmanouil Tsouderos	October 31, 1931	August 13, 1935	First term
Emmanouil Tsouderos	March 20, 1936	July 10, 1939	Second term; Prime Minister 1941–44 (in exile)
Ioannis Drosopoulos	July 10, 1939	July 28, 1939	
Kyriakos Varvaresos	August 4, 1939	February 2, 1946	
Xenophon Zolotas	October 12, 1944	January 8, 1945	First term; co-Governor
Georgios Mantzavinos	February 11, 1946	February 2, 1955	
Xenophon Zolotas	February 5, 1955	August 7, 1967	Second term
Dimitrios Galanis	August 7, 1967	May 4, 1973	
Konstantinos Papagiannis	May 7, 1973	August 9, 1974	
Panagis Papaligouras	August 9, 1974	October 24, 1974	
Xenophon Zolotas	November 26, 1974	November 3, 1981	Third term; Prime Minister 1989–90
Gerasimos Arsenis	November 3, 1981	February 20, 1984	
Dimitrios Chalikias	February 20, 1984	February 20, 1992	
Efthymios Christodoulou	February 20, 1992	December 1, 1993	
Ioannis Boutos	December 1, 1993	October 26, 1994	
Lucas Papademos	October 26, 1994	June 14, 2002	Prime Minister 2011–12
Nikolaos Garganas	June 14, 2002	June 14, 2008	Greek Financial Audit, 2004
Georgios Provopoulos	June 20, 2008	June 20, 2014	Greek government-debt crisis; European debt crisis
Yannis Stournaras	20 June 2014	Incumbent	Greek government-debt crisis; European debt crisis

=== Deputy governors ===
The Deputy Governor (Greek: υποδιοικητής, romanized: ypodioikētés) is the Bank's second-in-line officer. Traditionally the Deputy Governors' main remit is administration, whereas Governors supervise monetary policy at large.

- Emmanouil Tsouderos: April 21, 1928 – October 31, 1931
- Emmanouil Kamaras: November 25, 1931 – May 30, 1932
- Kyriakos Varvaresos: March 1, 1933 – August 4, 1939
- Georgios Mantzavinos: September 28, 1936 – February 11, 1946
- Ioannis Arvanitis: August 4, 1939 – April 26, 1941
- Stylianos Gregoriou: March 28, 1945 – February 2, 1955
- Vasileios Kyriakopoulos: February 5, 1955 – December 24, 1955
- Dimitrios Galanis: December 31, 1955 – August 7, 1967
- Ioannis Pesmazoglou: February 11, 1960 – August 5, 1967
- Konstantinos Thanos: January 5, 1968 – September 10, 1969
- Efstathios Panas: September 11, 1969 – August 9, 1974
- Nikolaos Kyriazidis: August 9, 1974 – January 5, 1977
- Nikolaos Charisopoulos: October 21, 1975 – November 6, 1981
- Evangelos Devletoglou: December 23, 1977 – November 8, 1978
- Georgios Drakos: November 24, 1978 – October 20, 1981
- Dimitrios Chalikias: November 16, 1981 – February 6, 1984
- Evangelos Kourakos (1st period): July 10, 1982 – February 11, 1986
- Panagiotis Korliras: February 20, 1984 – August 30, 1985
- Efstathios Papageorgiou: September 17, 1985 – September 17, 1989
- George Provopoulos: October 1, 1990 – November 29, 1993
- Vasileios Antonioudakis: October 1, 1990 – December 19, 1991
- Panagiotis Pavlopoulos: February 21, 1992 – November 29, 1993
- Evangelos Kourakos (2nd period): December 1, 1993 – September 4, 1996
- Lucas Papademos: December 1, 1993 – October 26, 1994
- Panagiotis Thomopoulos: October 26, 1994 – February 26, 2009
- Nikolaos Garganas: September 5, 1996 – June 13, 2002
- Nikolaos Palaiokrassas: June 14, 2002 – June 14, 2008
- Eleni Dendrinou Louri: June 20, 2008 – June 20, 2014
- Iannis Mourmouras: September, 2014 –
- Theodoros Mitrakos: March 2015 –

== Buildings ==
The Bank of Greece's central building on Panepistimiou Street was designed in 1933 by a team of architects led by Nikolaos Zoumpoulidis, Kimon Laskaris, and Konstantinos Papadakis and inaugurated in 1938. It was extended in the 1970s to occupy the entire block.

The building in Thessaloniki, on the northern corner of Eleftherias Square, was designed in 1925 by Aristomenis Valvis and N. Mitsakis for the National Bank of Greece. With the Bank of Greece being established in the course of its construction, it was remodeled to accommodate both institutions and completed in 1933. Since then, it has been continuously shared by the two, with respective entrances on opposite ends of the building.

The bank also erected branch buildings in a number of other Greek cities, aimed at providing services but also to project a sense of stability following the turmoil of the European banking crisis of 1931. For that, it adopted a generally neoclassical design style in the 1930s for the branches in Chania, Larissa, Mytilene, Samos, Serres, Tripoli and Volos, some of which were only completed after World War II. The Bank of Greece later completed new branch buildings in Heraklion, Ioannina and Komotini in the 1968s, Alexandroupolis in 2000, and Patras in 2001. In Kalamata, Kavala and Lamia, it purchased pre-existing buildings. The branch building in Rhodes was designed in Rome for the Bank of Italy under Italian rule of the Dodecanese, taken over by the Greek government in 1945, and transferred to the Bank of Greece in 1952.

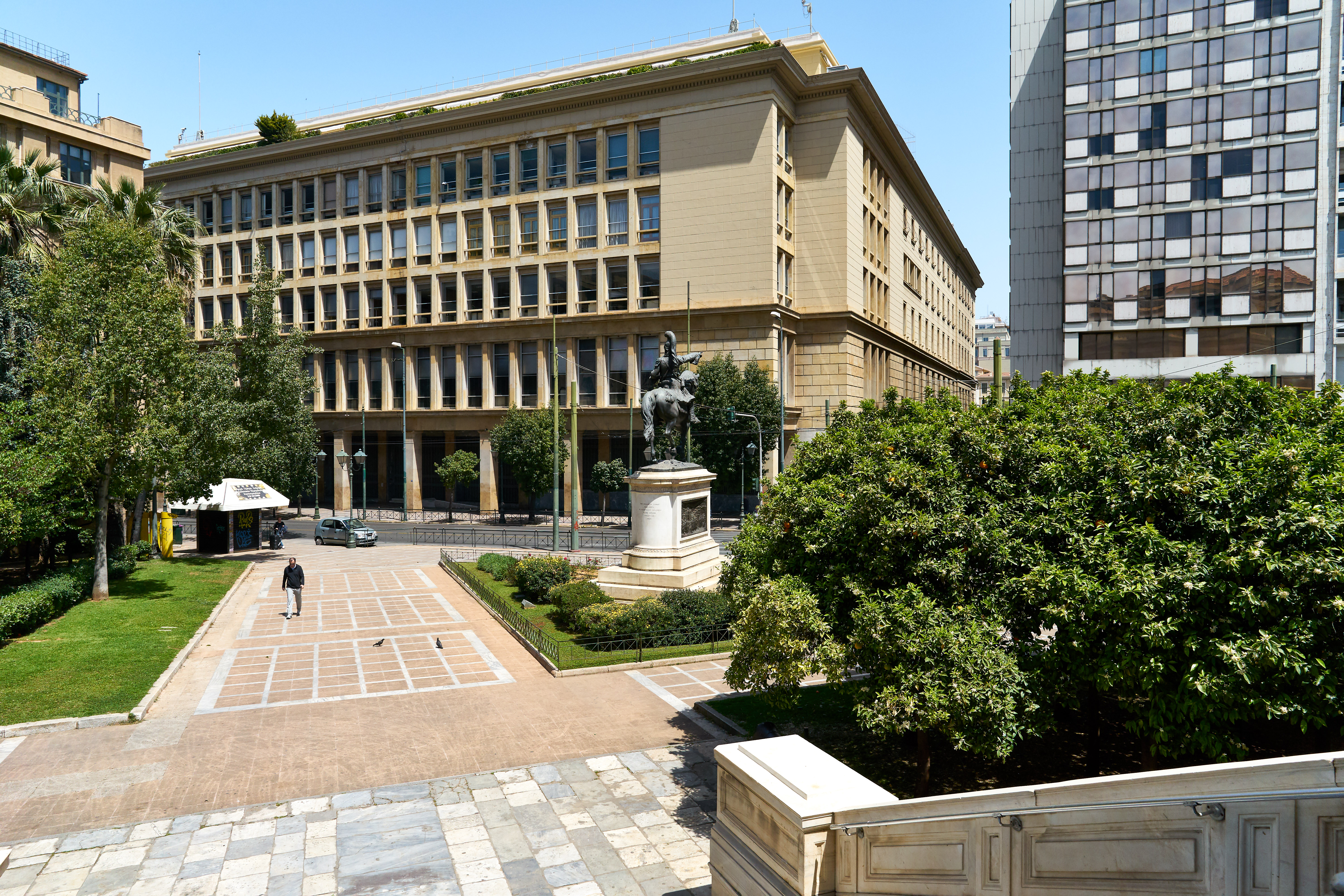
1970s extension of the head office building on Stadiou Street in Athens

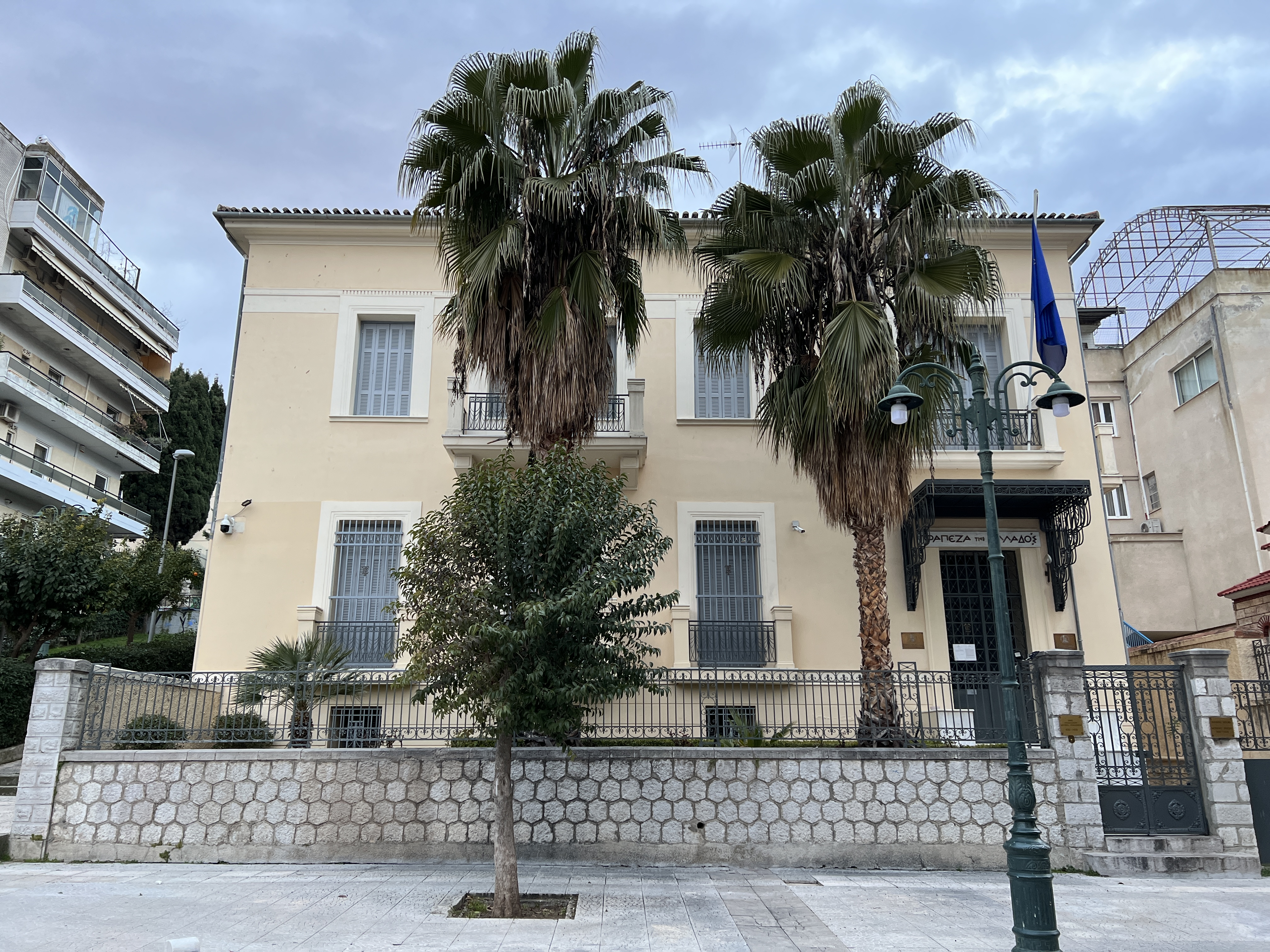
Branch building in Lamia, erected in 1927 and acquired by the Bank of Greece in 1940

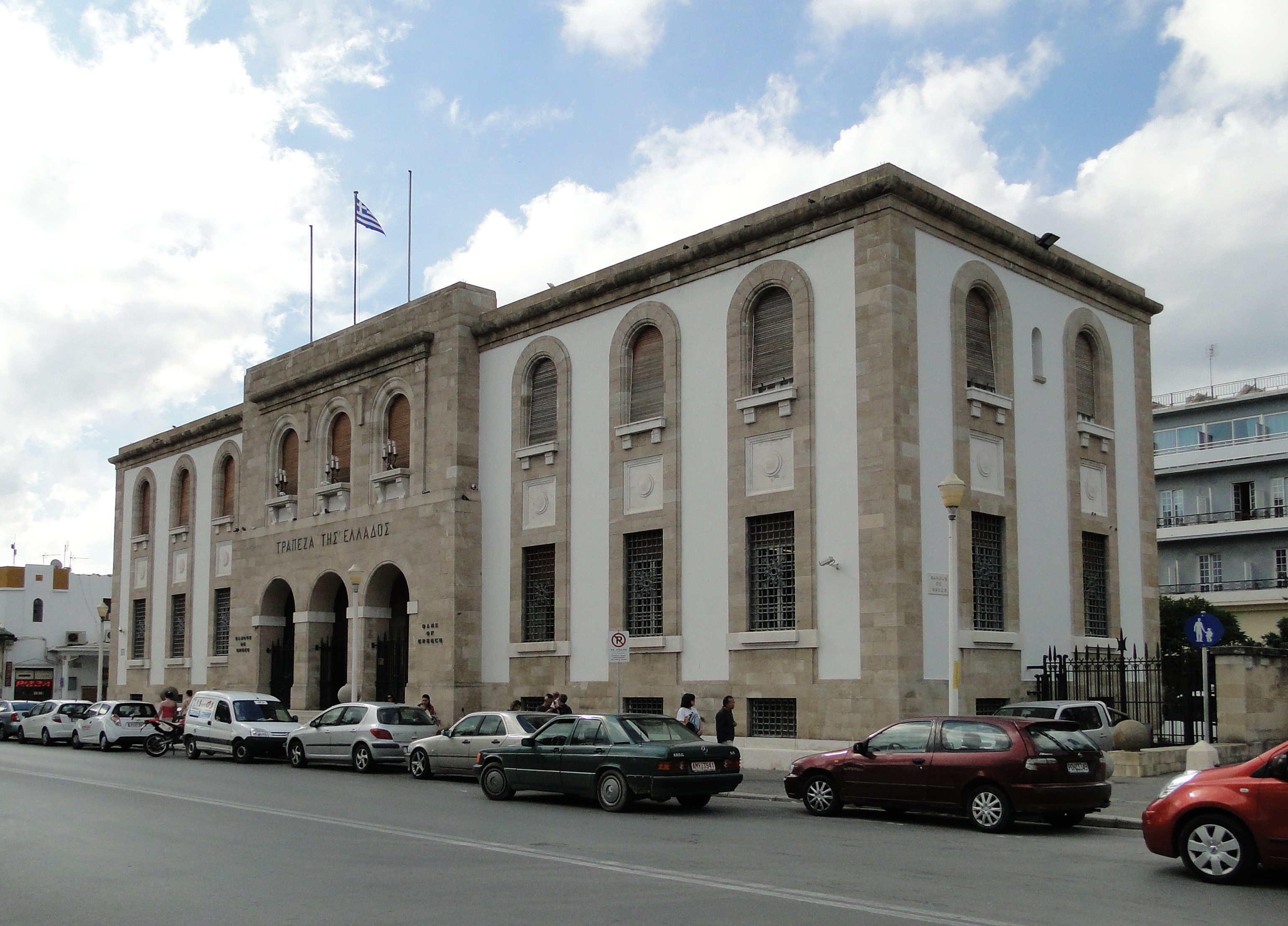
Branch building in Rhodes, originally completed 1930 for the Bank of Italy

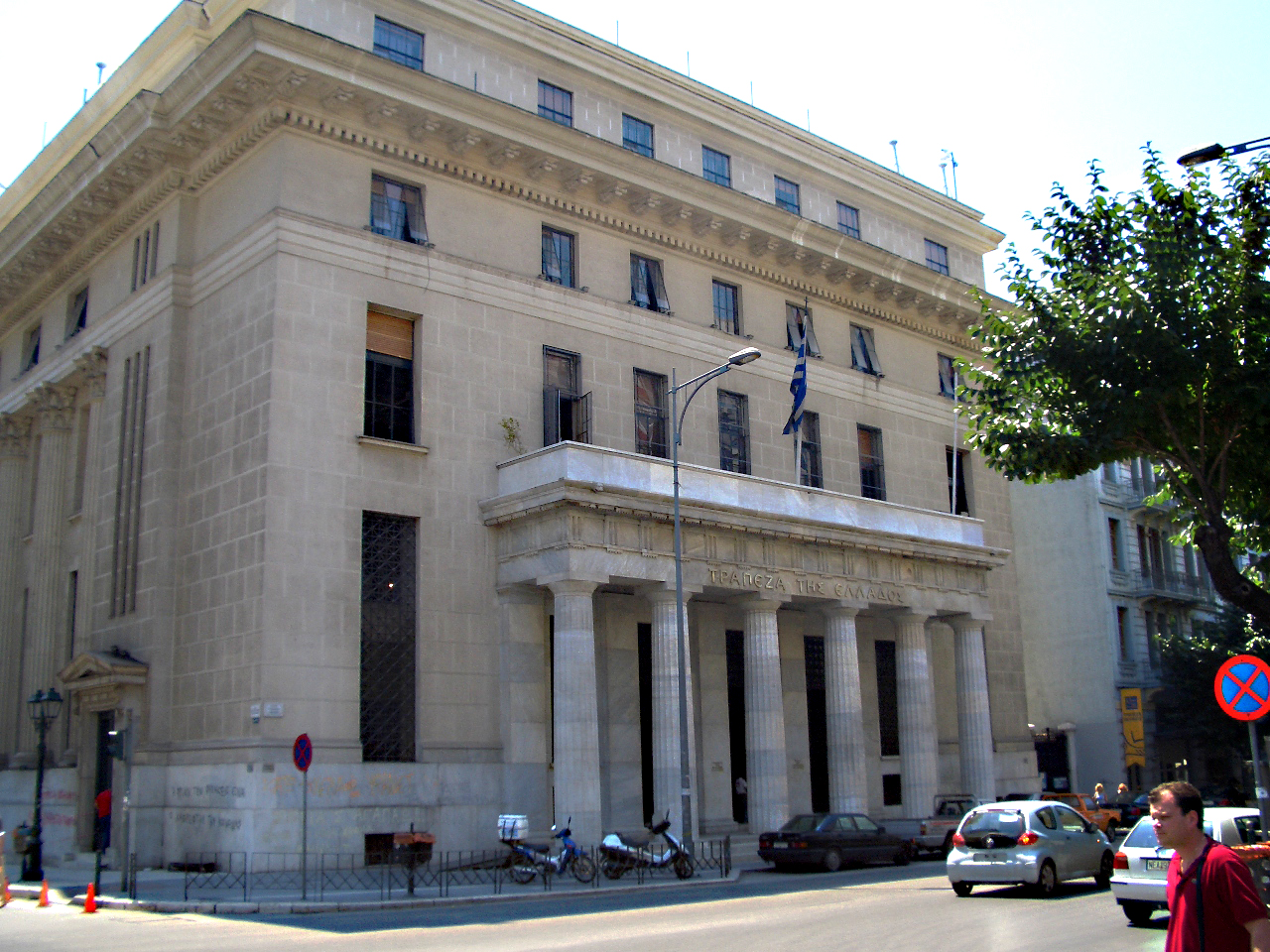
Branch building in Thessaloniki, shared with the National Bank of Greece

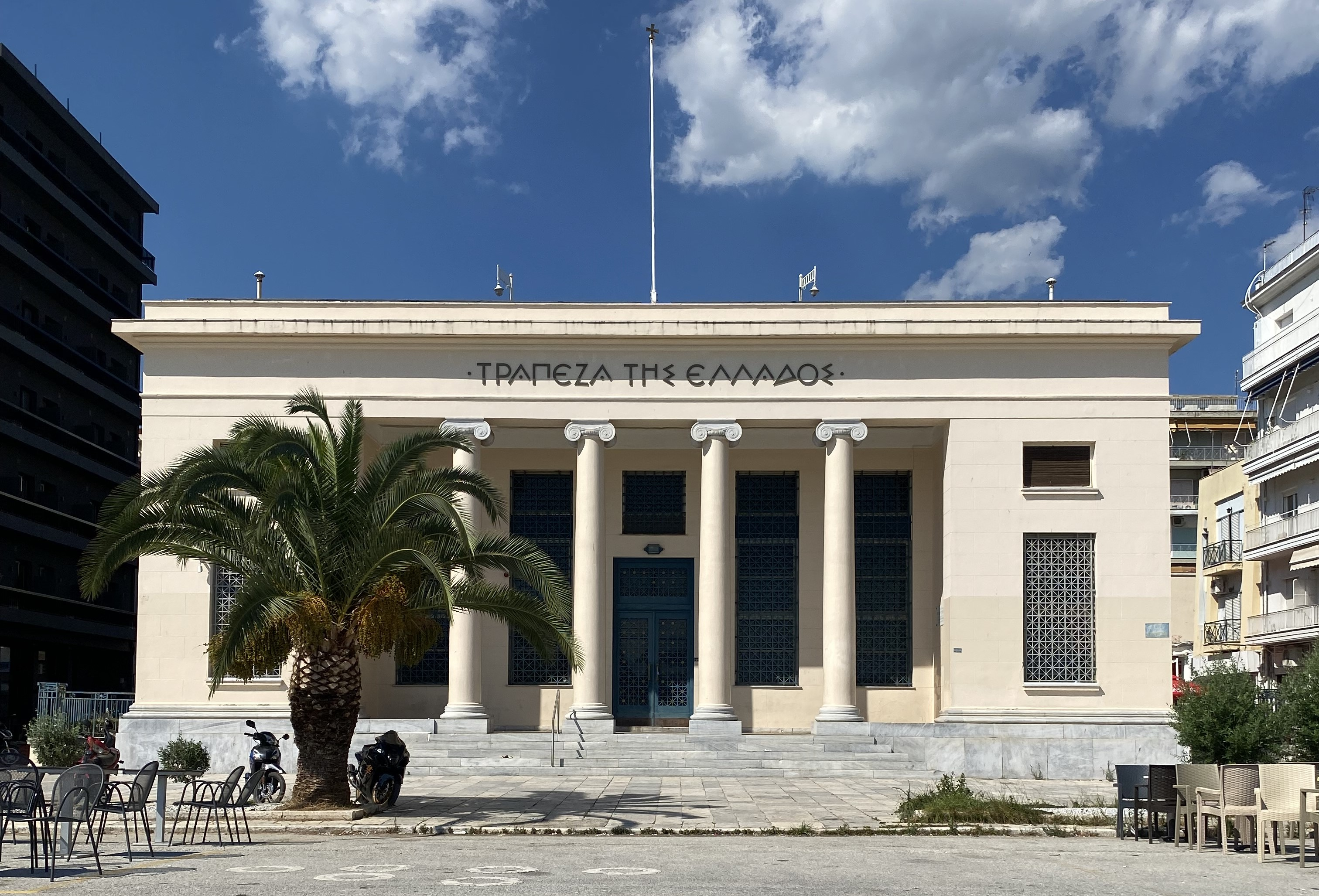
Branch building in Volos, completed in 1935

== See also ==
- List of banks in Greece
- List of central banks
- List of financial supervisory authorities by country

== Sources ==
- Hellenic Parliament, June 2015, page 22
