= Michael Behrens (banker) =

British financier, banker (1911–1989)

- Born: Edward Michael Behrens; 15 September 1911
- Died: 28 January 1989 (aged 77)
- Occupation: financier
- Known for: co-owner of the Ionian Bank
- Spouse: Helen Constance Felicity Arnold (m. 1936)
- Children: 3 sons, including Timothy Behrens
- Parent(s): Noel Edward Behrens; Catherine Vivien Coward
- Relatives: Betty Behrens (sister); Sir Cecil Coward (grandfather)

Edward Michael Behrens (15 September 1911 – 28 January 1989) was a British financier, banker, stockbroker, and restaurant and gallery owner, who became co-owner of the Ionian Bank. Through his ownership of the Hanover Gallery, he was an early patron of the artist Francis Bacon.

== Early life ==
Edward Michael Behrens was born on 15 September 1911, in Kensington, London. His parents were Noel Edward Behrens (1879–1967), a civil servant until his retirement in 1921 and then a banker, and his wife, Catherine Vivien Coward (1880–1961), the daughter of Sir Cecil Coward (1845–1938). Behrens's elder sister Betty Behrens became an historian and academic.

== Career ==
In 1953, Behrens already owned La Resèrve restaurant. He bought the "influential" Hanover Gallery from Arthur Jeffress. The gallery had been representing Francis Bacon, who had his first solo show there in 1949. It continued to represent him until 1958 when Bacon left for the Marlborough Gallery.

Behrens was visiting the empty gallery for the first time one evening when Erica Brausen, who ran it, mentioned in passing that she would be closing operations the next day. Behrens was "immediately fascinated" by Bacon's work, and offered to help keep the gallery open. Jeffress "detested" Bacon, which was his chief reason to leave the Hanover Gallery. Jeffress reportedly thought that Behrens also "loathed" Bacon.

In 1958, Behrens and John Trusted, both stockbrokers at the time and directors of the British Bank for Foreign Trade, acquired the long-established Ionian Bank, which had operated in the Greek islands. Ionian Bank became "a leader in North Sea oil".

== Personal life ==
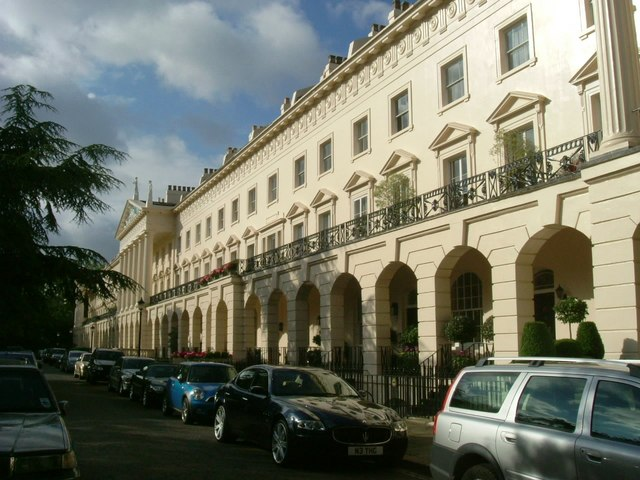
Hanover Terrace

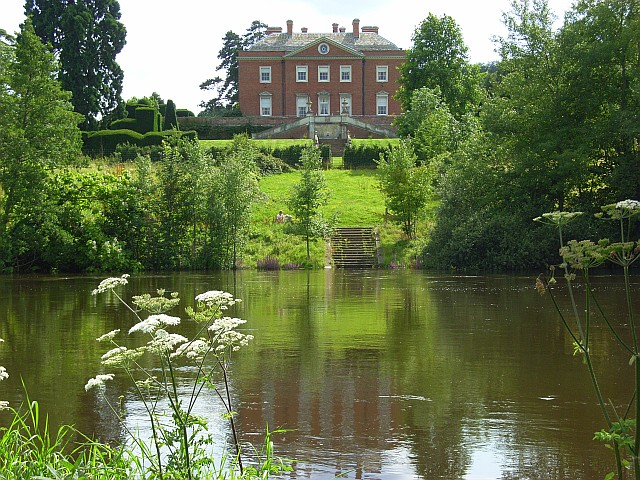
Culham Court, 2007

In 1936, Behrens married Helen Constance Felicity Arnold (1913–2001). Their three sons included Timothy Behrens, who became an artist. Although Behrens had bought the Hanover Gallery, he was not happy with his son's wish to pursue an artistic career.

The family lived at 8 Hanover Terrace, overlooking Regent's Park. In 1949 Behrens bought Culham Court, a large house in Berkshire on the river Thames. After his death, Felicity lived there until 1996.

Behrens had an affair with novelist Elizabeth Jane Howard in the late 1940s. She modelled the protagonist in her novel The Long View (1956) on him.

In addition to his restaurant and gallery holdings, Behrens was patron to silver and goldsmith Gerald Benney.

== Death ==
Behrens died in London on 28 January 1989, at the age of 77.
