= Hellenic Financial Stability Fund =

The Hellenic Financial Stability Fund (Greek: Ταμείο Χρηματοπιστωτικής Σταθερότητας), or HFSF is a Greek special purpose vehicle created to help stabilize the Greek banking sector amidst the Greek government-debt crisis.

== Formation ==
Based in Athens, the HFSF was founded in July 2010 under Law 3864/2010 as a state-owned private legal entity with the purpose to "contribute to the maintenance of the stability of the Greek banking system, for the sake of public interest". It began its operation on 30 September 2010 with the appointment of the members of the fund's Board of Directors.

The fund has been seeded by the European Financial Stability Facility (EFSF) with 50 billion euros to recapitalize Greece's banks.

== Management ==
Originally governed by a Board of Directors, on 30 January 2013, the fund's management was reorganized into a two-tier management structure, consisting of the General Council and the Executive Board. While Anastasia Sakellariou was appointed Managing Director, or CEO, as part of the Executive Board, Paul Koster became Chairman of the General Council. Koster however resigned on 15 March 2013 and was replaced by Christos Sclavounis.

Following the January 2015 legislative election, the new SYRIZA government was expected to replace Sclavounis by Panagiotis Roumeliotis, while Sakellariou would remain Managing Director. Shortly thereafter, Sclavounis indeed resigned from his office as Chairman.

Sakellariou (Chief Executive Director of the HFSF between 2013 and 2015) was asked by the Greek government to step down from its position in May 2015 as she was charged, alongside other 25 former executives of the Hellenic Post Bank, with breach of trust for restructuring loans issued by the state lender.

In 2022, the Greek government proposed a law about divestment, lifetime and governance of the HFSF, special powers and rights of the HFSF; the ECB expressed a positive opinion on the proposal.

== Operations ==
During the first year and half after its creation, the HFSF had capital for €1.5 billion. During this time the only bank receiving funds from it was New Proton.

In spring 2013, the HFSF together with the Bank of Greece led the merger of ten Greek banks into four "systemic" banks.

By early 2015, the HFSF kept a remaining buffer of 11 billion euros in EFSF bonds that the outgoing Greek government had intended to repurpose as a precautionary credit line. In February 2015, the new, SYRIZA-led administration negotiated with the Troika over a six-month extension of the Master Financial Assistance Facility Agreement. The administration proposed repurposing the remaining funds for Keynesian anti-cyclical investments in the non-banking economic sector. The Eurogroup however insisted that the remaining buffer "can only be used for bank recapitalisation and resolution costs".

National Bank of Greece

In 2014 HFSF had a representative (Independent Non-Executive Member) in the board of directors of National Bank of Greece.

Alpha Bank

HFSF has a representative (non-executive member) in the board of directors of Alpha Bank (12 May 2015); this representative is a member of the Risk Management Committee of the bank, the Audit Committee, the Remuneration Committee and the Corporate Governance and Nominations Committee.

Eurobank-Ergasias S.A.

HFSF has a representative (non-executive director) in the board of directors of the bank Eurobank Ergasias (13 May 2015).

Pireaus Bank

HFSF has a representative in the board of directors of Piraeus Bank (2015).

HFSF had the option to convert €2 billion of perpetual bonds into Piraeus Bank shares in December 2022. As of November 2020, the total market capitalization of the bank was less than €500 million. The conversion was triggered in November 2020, giving HFSF a further 35% share of the bank, worth less than 200 million euro, a paper loss of over 1.5 billion euro.

== Privatizations ==
In Fall 2023, the HFSF started to sell its stakes in Greek lenders, in order to reprivatise the banks. As of March 2024, it had recouped €34.8 billion out of €30.9 billion injected into the banking system (without considering inflation). In October 2024, the HFSF completed the privatization with the sell of its stake in National Bank of Greece.

National Bank of Greece

In November 2023, the HFSF reduced its stake in NBG from 40.39% to 20,39%. In October 2024, the HFSF sold a 10% stake in NGB and will transfer its remaining 8.4% stake in National Bank to Greece’s sovereign wealth fund at the end of the year.

Alpha Bank

In November 2023, the HFSF sold its entire stake of Alpha Bank (a 9% share) to UniCredit.

Piraeus Bank

In March 2024, the HFSF sold its entire 27 percent stake in Piraeus Bank, thus fully privatising the bank and raising 1.35 billion euros.

Eurobank Ergasias

In October 2023, the HFSF sold its 1.4% stake in Eurobank, which was bought by Eurobank for €93.7 million euros .
