= Emporiki Bank =

Greek bank

Commercial Bank of Greece Εμπορική Τράπεζα της Ελλάδας

- Former head office of Emporiki Bank in Athens
- Type: Subsidiary
- Industry: Financial services
- Predecessor: Commercial Bank of Greece
- Founded: 1907 as Commercial Bank of Greece
- Defunct: February 28, 2013
- Fate: Absorbed by Alpha Bank
- Headquarters: Athens, Greece
- Number of employees: 4,000
- Website: www.emporiki.gr

The Commercial Bank of Greece (Greek: Εμπορική Τράπεζα της Ελλάδας, thus also known as Emporiki Bank) was a bank established in London in 1907, with an initial focus on activity in Greece. In 1922, its operations expanded geographically through its affiliate the Commercial Bank of the Near East. The bank was nationalized in 1975 amid political and economic changes in Greece.

In 2006, it was privatized and acquired by the French banking group Crédit Agricole, which gradually increased its ownership to 95% and delisted the bank from the Athens Stock Exchange in 2011.

Crédit Agricole retained Emporiki’s international subsidiaries in Romania, Bulgaria, and Albania, integrating and later rebranding them under its own brand. Facing significant losses during the Greek financial crisis, Crédit Agricole sold Emporiki’s Greek operations to Alpha Bank in October 2012 for the symbolic price of €1. The legal merger was completed on 28 February 2013, when Emporiki ceased to exist as a separate entity and was fully absorbed into Alpha Bank’s network.

== History ==
The Commercial Bank of Greece (CBG) was established in London by the Greek banker Gregorios Empedocles (Greek: Γρηγόριος Εμπεδοκλής) in 1907 and two years later listed on the stock exchange. In 1922, CBG established Commercial Bank of the Near East (CBNE) in London with CBG as a major shareholder and with the banker Nicolas Christofides as chief manager. The latter expanded CBG's international operations further by opening a first branch of the Commercial Bank of the Near East in Constantinople in 1922, a second one in Alexandria in 1925, and subsequently another in Cairo. Nicolas Christofides, who settled in Alexandria in the 1920s-30s, managed the Turkish and Egyptian branches of the CBNE until the 1960s.

After the Suez Crisis in 1956, Egypt nationalized the operations of British and French banks. To avoid nationalization, in 1957, N. Christofides convinced the Egyptian authorities that the Commercial Bank of the Near East, despite its official British nationality, was unofficially Greek, arguing that all shareholders and clients were Greek. Thus, CBNE, which was incorporated in London, transferred its branches in Egypt to Commercial Bank of Greece. This proved to be of only temporary help as in 1960 the Egyptian government nationalized all banks in Egypt, including CBG’s branches in Cairo and Alexandria.

At about the same time, i.e., in 1959, CBG acquired the Greek operations of Ionian Bank, including its ownership of Popular Bank. CBG continued to operate the bank separately, and later renamed it Ionian and Popular Bank of Greece. CBG also acquired a major shareholding in Banque du Piree (Piraeus Bank), which had been established in 1916. CBG continued to grow in Greece via acquisition when in it acquired a major equity stake (29% in 1995) in Bank of Attica, which had been established in 1925.

In 1965, CBG entered the European Common Market when it created Griechische Handelsbank in Frankfurt am Main. Later this subsidiary changed its name to Commercial Bank of Greece (Germany).

Twenty-five years later, in 1990, CBG renamed its subsidiary in London to Commercial Bank of London.

In 1994 CBG opened its first branch in Nicosia, Cyprus. The next year CBG’s International Banking Unit in Limassol, Cyprus commenced operations. CBG also started to expand in the former Communist countries. First, it became a strategic investor in Bulgarian Investment Bank. Meanwhile, CBG sold Commercial Bank of London to Alpha Credit Bank (now Alpha Bank), which renamed it Alpha Bank London.

In 1996 Bulgarian Investment Bank became International Commercial Bank (Bulgaria). CBG owned 91%, directly and indirectly, of the bank. CBG also established a wholly owned subsidiary, International Commercial Black Sea Bank (Romania), which later became Emporiki Bank România. CBG established International Commercial Black Sea Bank (Georgia) together with the European Bank for Reconstruction and Development and United Georgian Bank. (United Georgian Bank was the result of the merger of three banks: Industrial Bank, Eximbank and New Georgian Bank – formerly Savings Bank.)

While it was expanding internationally, CBG started to rationalize its Greek business. Thus in 1997 CBG reduced its position in Attica Bank to 18%. More importantly, two years later it sold its 51% stake in Ionian Bank to Alpha Credit Bank. In 2001, CBG incorporated Commercial Bank of Greece (Cyprus), of which it owned 75%, and to which it contributed its four branches in Cyprus and its International Banking Unit there. At some point, Commercial Bank of Greece rebranded all its operations as Emporiki Bank.

CBG in 1998 established International Commercial Bank (Moldova), and Commercial Bank of Greece (Armenia). The next year CBG established a representative office in Odesa, as well as Intercommercial Bank (Albania) SA which started operating in 2000. Also in 2000, CBG acquired Romanian International Commercial Black Sea Bank and 35% of FinCom Bank in Moldova. However, in 2002, CBG started to undo its previous international expansion outside the Greek-speaking parts of the Mediterranean. First it disposed of its subsidiaries in Armenia, Georgia and Moldova. Then in 2005, Emporiki Bank disposed of its German subsidiary.

In 2006, as part of Greece’s ongoing efforts to privatize state-owned enterprises, Emporiki Bank was sold to the French bank Crédit Agricole.This acquisition marked a significant shift for the bank, transitioning it from a largely state-controlled institution to a subsidiary of one of Europe’s largest banking groups. Over the following years, Crédit Agricole gradually increased its stake in Emporiki, eventually acquiring approximately 95% ownership by 2011. This majority ownership allowed Crédit Agricole to fully control the bank’s strategic direction and operations. Subsequently, Emporiki was delisted from the Athens Stock Exchange in 2011, removing it from public trading and consolidating its status as a wholly owned subsidiary.

During this period, Crédit Agricole chose to retain Emporiki’s international subsidiaries operating in Romania, Bulgaria and Albania. These foreign branches were integrated into Crédit Agricole’s broader international network and underwent rebranding to align with the Crédit Agricole corporate identity. This move was part of Crédit Agricole’s strategy to strengthen its presence in the Southeastern European banking markets.

However, the onset of the Greek financial crisis severely impacted Emporiki Bank’s performance in its home market. The bank faced significant financial difficulties and mounting losses, which strained Crédit Agricole’s willingness to maintain its Greek operations. In response to these challenges, Crédit Agricole decided to sell Emporiki’s Greek business to Alpha Bank in October 2012. The sale was made for the nominal sum of €1, reflecting the distressed condition of the bank. The transaction culminated in a formal legal merger, completed on 28 February 2013, when Emporiki Bank officially ceased to exist as an independent legal entity. From that date forward, all of Emporiki’s assets, liabilities, personnel, and branch operations were fully absorbed into Alpha Bank’s network, marking the end of over a century of Emporiki’s history as a standalone institution in the Greek banking sector.

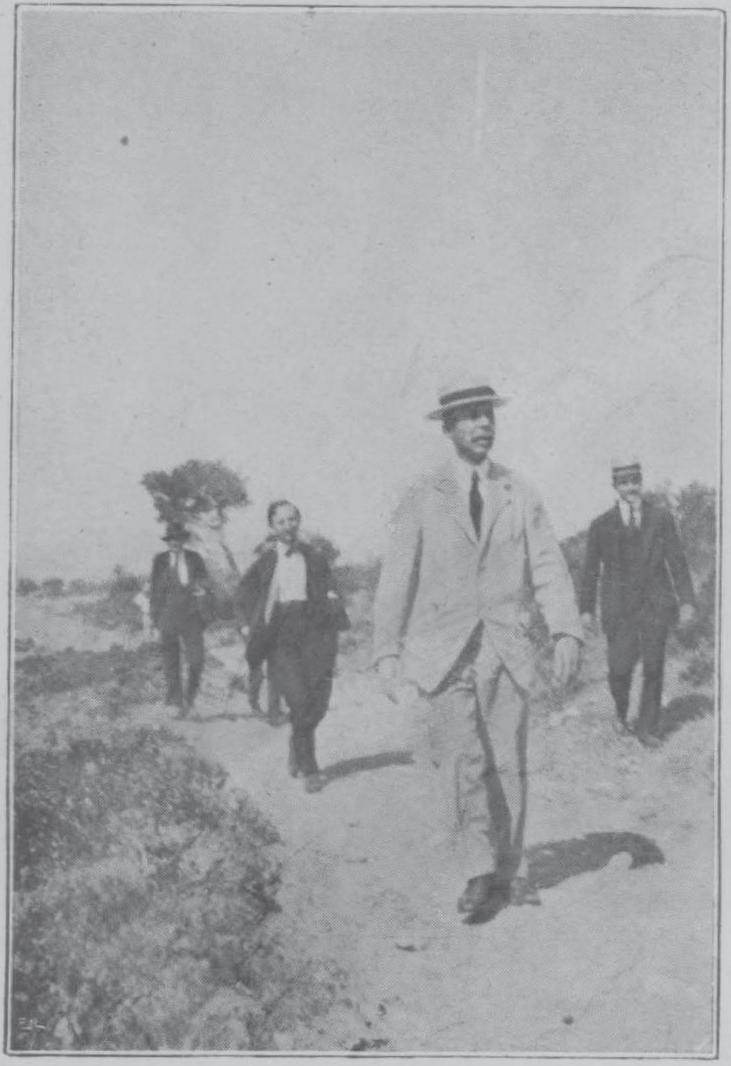
Grigorios Empedoklis, founder of Emporiki Bank

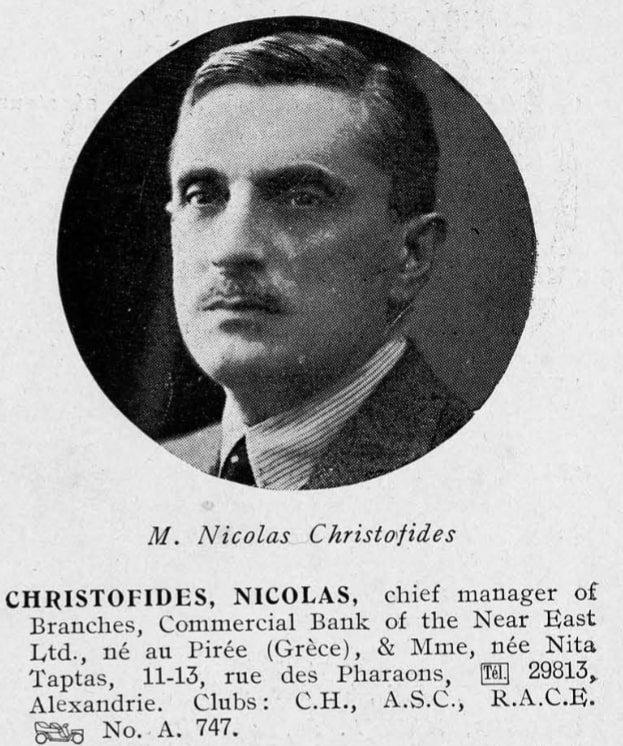
Nicolas Christofides, founder and chief manager of the Commercial Bank of the Near East, pictured in Le Mondain Egyptien

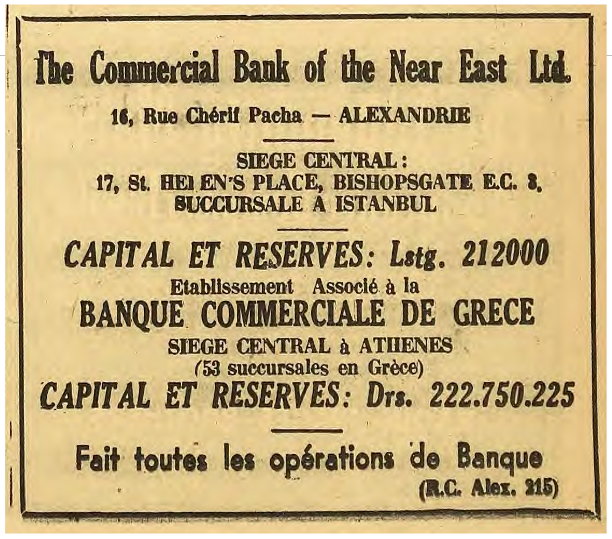
Advert of the Commercial Bank of the Near East

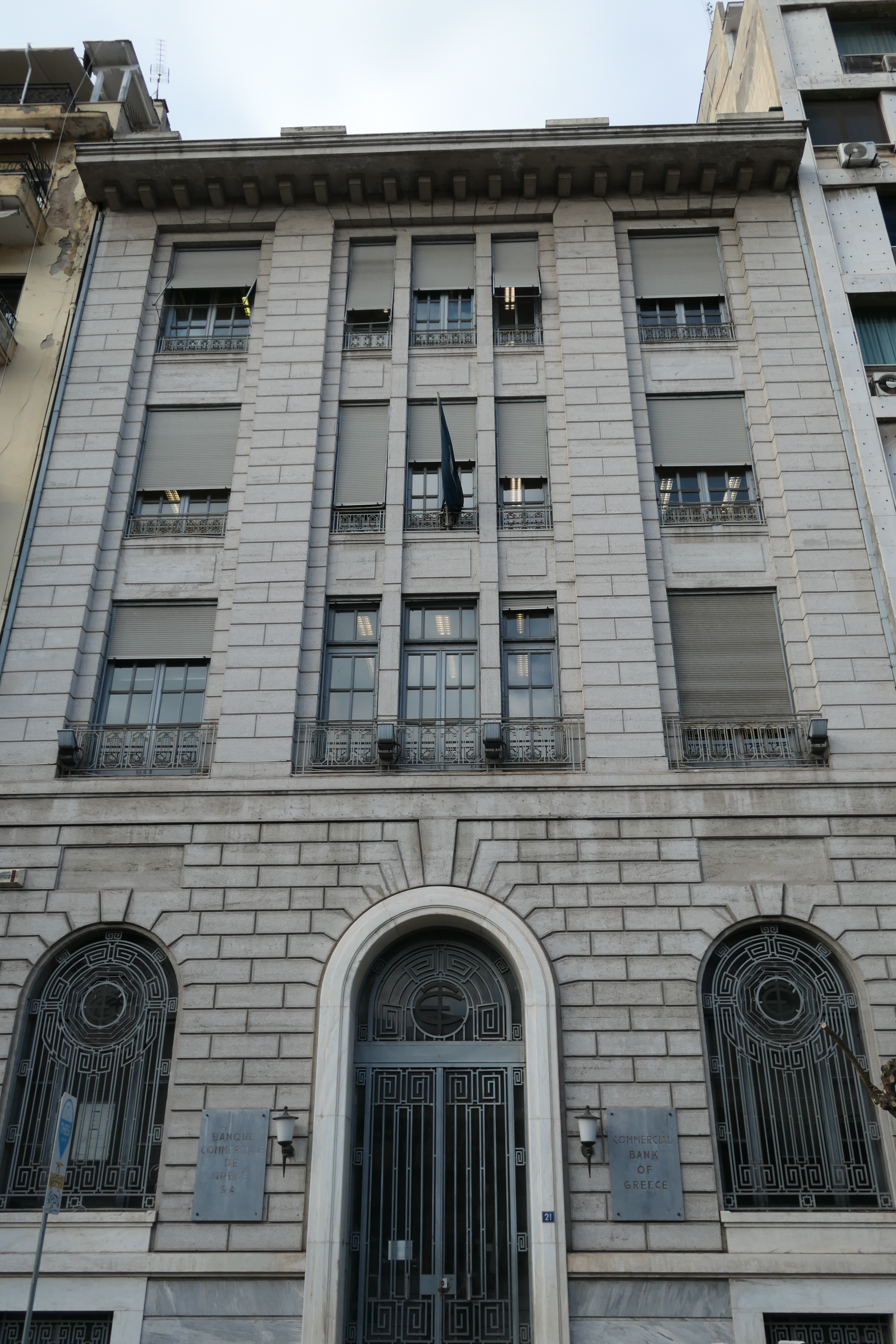
Emporiki Bank building in Thessaloniki

== See also ==
- List of banks in Greece
