= Banknote Museum of Alpha Bank =

Museum in Corfu, Greece

Coordinates: 39°37′29″N 19°55′21″E

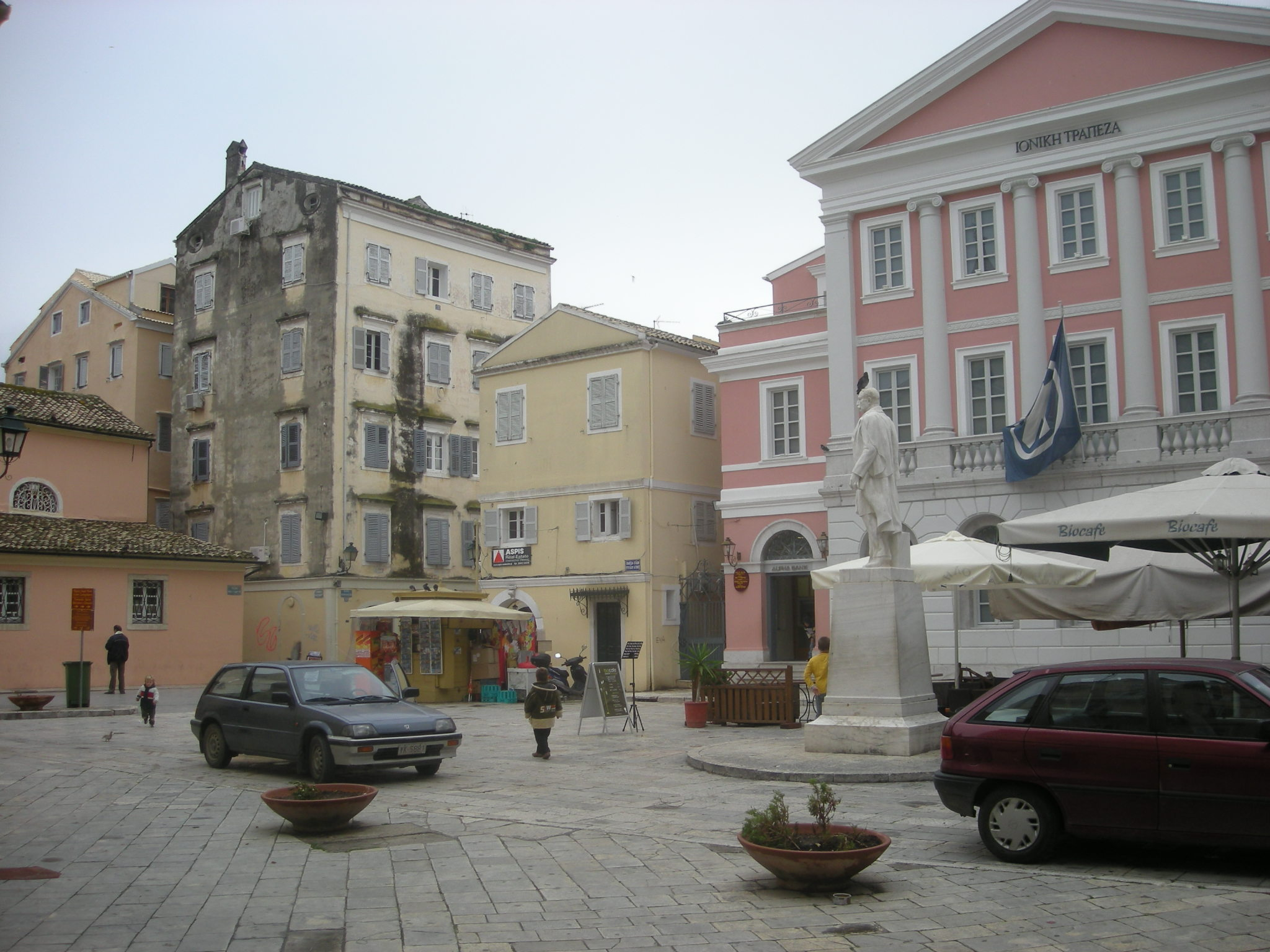
Heroes Square and the Ionian Bank

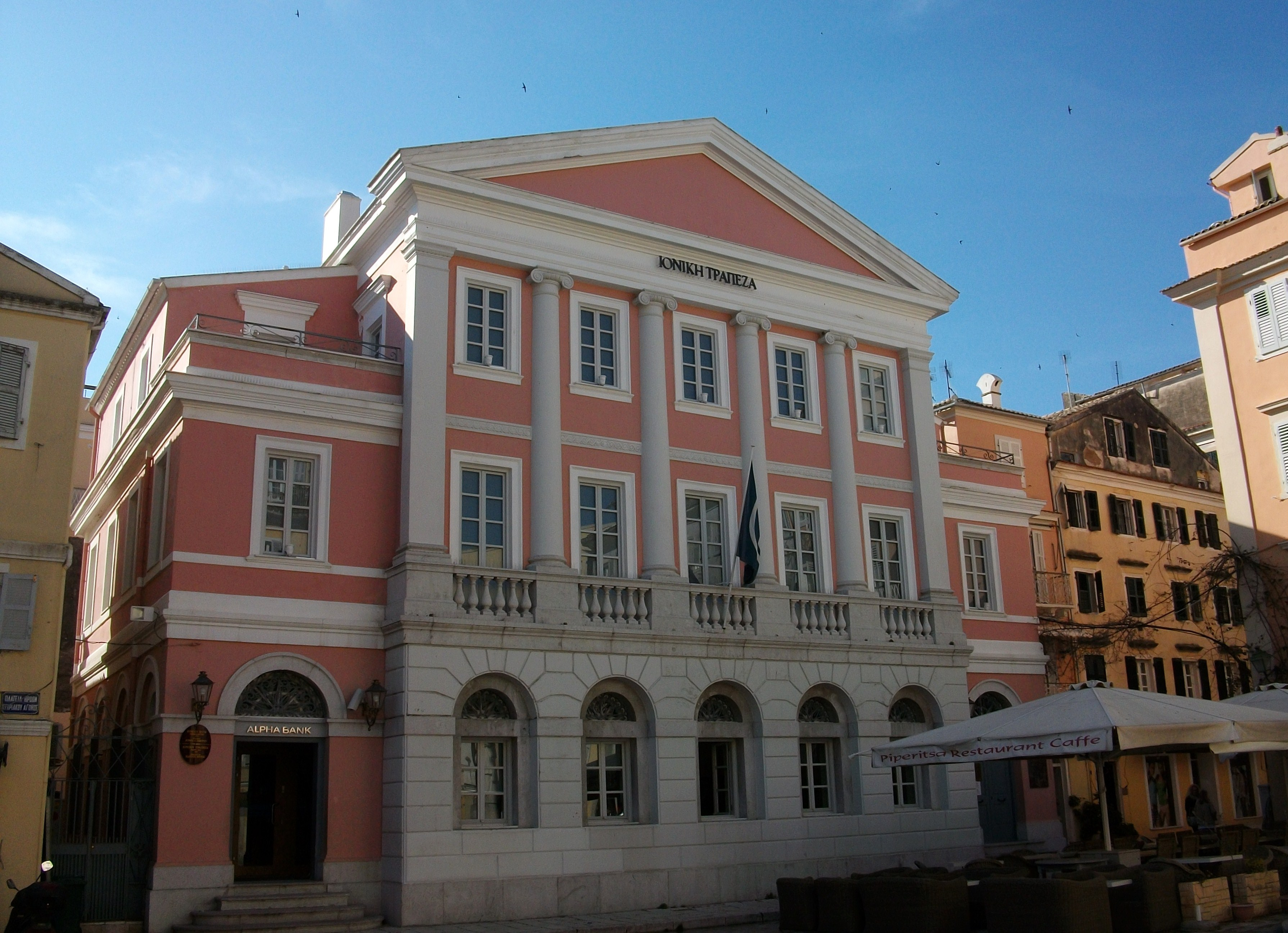
The building

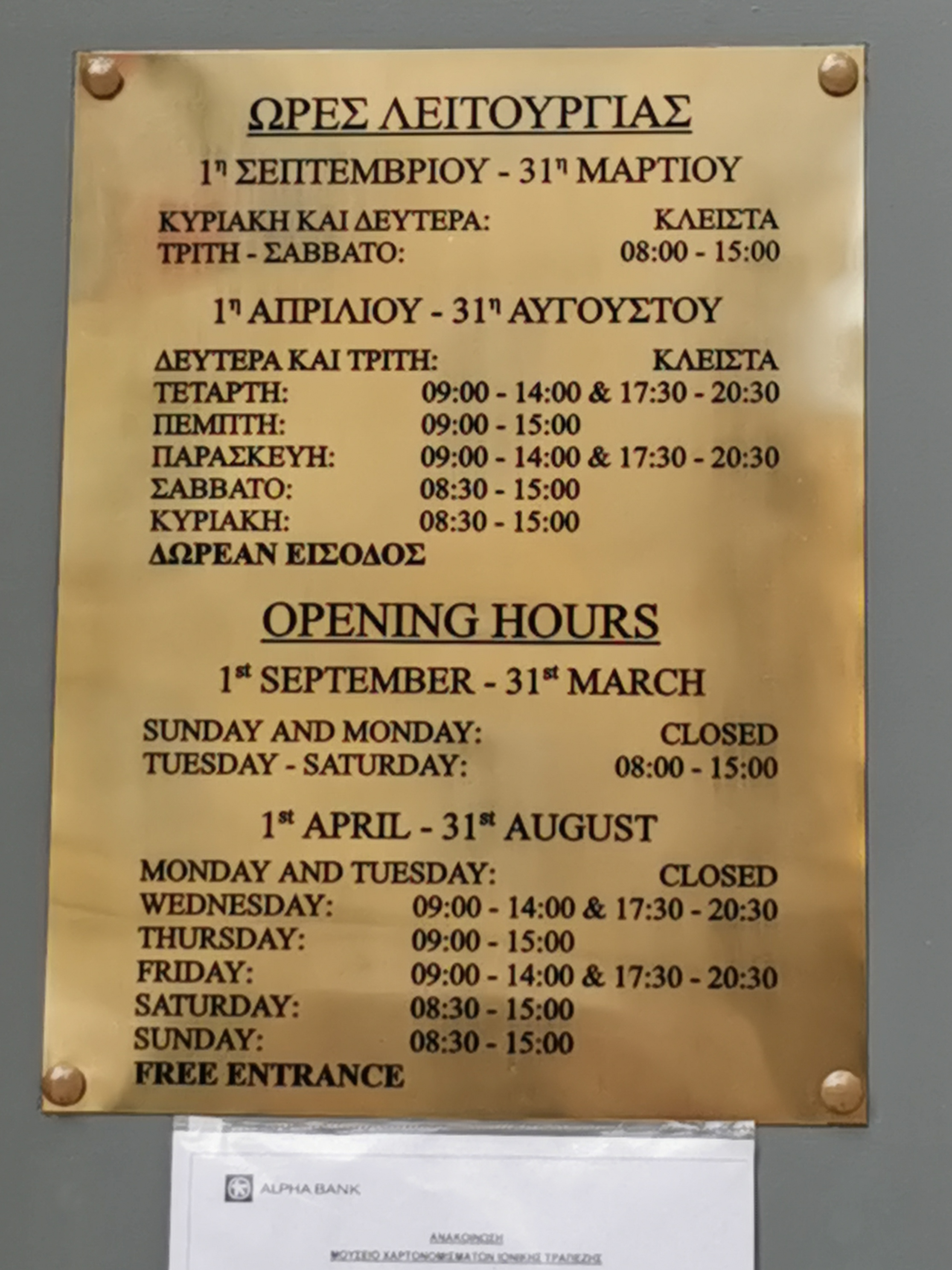
sign

The Banknote Museum of Alpha Bank (formerly Banknote Museum of the Ionian Bank) is a museum located in Corfu, Greece.

It exhibits an almost complete collection of the Greek currencies from 1822 to present, about 2000 items. It includes the first treasury bonds issued by the newly liberated Greek State in 1822. It also shows the replacement of the drachma by the euro in 2002. Exhibits include sketches, essays, and printing plates of Greek banknotes. One of its rarest holdings is the 1860 "colonata".

The museum was established in 1981 by the Ionian Bank. It is housed at the former Ionian Bank building, designed by Corfiote architect Ioannis Chronis in about 1840. In 2000 Ionian Bank merged with Alpha Bank. The Banknote Museum was renovated and was reopened in 2005. An additional exhibit hall was added showcasing "Ionian Bank Limited, which was a British venture and the first bank to operate in Greek territory. The museum collection is considered one of the most complete of its kind in the world.

== History and exhibits ==
In 2003 Aris Rapidis, the curator of the museum and a historian, undertook the renovation and coordination of the exhibits to conform to world standards. In 2005 and with the participation of John Keyworth, curator of the Bank of England, the renovated exhibits were opened to the public. It is the first time that such a banknote collection, owned by a Greek bank, has been made available to the general public on a regularly scheduled basis. Between 2005 and 2007 about 10,000 people have visited the museum. In July 2007, an exhibition hall was constructed on the second floor of the museum. The exhibition Greek Costumes – Printed sources of the 16th-20th centuries, jointly organised with the Benaki Museum, became the first event to be showcased at the hall.

The museum contains historical material pertaining to the history of the Ionian Bank and a complete series of the last issues of the national banknotes of the Euro zone member states prior to their replacement by the euro. The manufacturing process of banknotes is included among the exhibits as well as the method of adding a watermark. A workshop details the metal plate engraving process.

Among the museum exhibits are some rare specimens of Greek currency. Exhibits include the first banknotes issued by first Governor of Greece Ioannis Kapodistrias. The Kapodistrias notes are simple and feature a rose-coloured Phoenix on white background. The museum collection also contains the pre-Kapodistrian treasury bonds issued by the provisional Greek government in "pisters" or "grossia".

The National Bank of Greece was established in 1841 and the ancient drachma was again designated as the official currency of Greece. The museum exhibits the first banknotes printed by the British printing houses Perkins Bacon or Bradbury Wilkins. The collection includes notes printed by the American Banknote Company, which succeeded the British at the turn of the century. The American company printed Greek banknotes until about 1928. Subsequent to that the Bank of Greece undertook the printing of the currency on its own.

One of the rarest banknotes on exhibit is the one depicting the Byzantine church of Hagia Sophia in Constantinople. Designed in 1920, the banknote depicts Hagia Sophia without the Ottoman minarets and was part of the Megali Idea. A few years later the Asia Minor disaster occurred and the currency was never circulated.

Rare art deco-style banknotes, printed in France, some featuring Hermes, allegorically depict the continuity of Greek currency and commerce from ancient times to the 1930s.

The exhibition includes banknotes that were issued during WWII by the occupying Axis forces.

Banknotes issued by the provisional "mountain government" are also exhibited. This currency was valued against the equivalent value of kilograms of wheat. The 100 billion drachma banknote during the hyperinflation years of 1944 is also featured. It remains historically the highest banknote denomination in Greece and after the hyperinflation ended, its value fell to just 2 drachmas.

The museum is located on Aghios Spyridon Square in Corfu city and the admission is free.

The museum also hosted a conference held between June 9–10, 2006, under the title of "The Economic Development of South-eastern Europe in the 19th century".
