= Proton Bank =

Proton Bank S.A.
- Trade name: Proton Bank
- Native name: Proton Τράπεζα Α.Ε.
- Company type: Public Company
- Traded as: Anonymi Etairia
- Industry: Financial services
- Founded: June 2001 in Athens, Greece
- Founder: John Markopoulos, Anthony Athanasoglou and Elias Lianos
- Defunct: 2013
- Headquarters: Athens, Greece
- Number of locations: 27 branches
- Area served: Greece
- Products: Commercial banking, Investment banking
- Number of employees: 670 (2007)
- Website: www.proton.gr

Proton Bank (in Greek Proton Τράπεζα Α.Ε.) was a Greek bank that was established in 2001 and was taken over by the government in 2011. The bank offered private and corporate banking services.

The private banking division offers included deposits, loans and credit cards, portfolio management, asset management, brokerage services and mutual funds. The corporate banking division offered working capital financing, customer-tailored loans, treasury products and brokerage services.

In 2011 Proton became the first Greek bank to be effectively nationalized after it fell under a bank rescue fund set up by Greece and its international lenders through the creation of New Proton Bank. The bank was wound up in 2013.

== History ==
The bank was established in 2001 as Τράπεζα Επενδυτικών Δραστηριοτήτων Α.Ε. and officially commenced its operations as a specialised investment bank in 2002. The founders of the bank were John Markopoulos, Anthony Athanasoglou and Elias Lianos.

Following a rapid development path, the bank was listed on the Athens Stock Exchange in December 2005 and later absorbed three listed closed-end funds, namely Arrow, Exelixi and Eurodynamics.

In September 2006 was renamed Proton Bank and it absorbed Omega Bank, with the new entity's share capital reaching €650 mil.

In December 2007 Bank Hapoalim (BKHPF.PK) started negotiations with Proton Bank's major shareholder IRF investment fund (of Angeliki Frangou) over a possible buy out. The agreement never concluded because of issues related to Israel's central bank.

In September 2008 Proton Bank's major shareholder IRF fund sold their shares to other shareholders and a few days later Piraeus Bank started negotiations to acquire Proton . The agreement finalized in November 2008 with Piraeus Bank acquiring 31.31% of Proton's total shares.

In December 2009 pharmaceutical and media magnate Lavrentis Lavrentiadis acquired the Piraeus Bank owned 31.31% of shares, becoming major shareholder and president of the bank.

In 2011 it came under investigation for money laundering violations.

In October 2011 the bank's license was withdrawn and the bank was put into liquidation by recommendation of the Bank of Greece. The Greek Government used the provisions regarding credit institutions’ resolution to create a new "Good Bank" that received all the assets of Proton and called New Proton Bank. The new Good Bank also received the brand name Proton Bank and continued using the name for its operations until 2013.

== Broking Services ==
Proton Bank was a member of Athens Stock Exchange, EUREX and Cyprus Stock Exchange.

It was the first broker in Greece to establish and operate the Reuters Order Routing system in both modes, allowing Proton Bank to operate in Execution Venue Mode receiving orders directly on-line from foreign brokers for the Athens Exchange, as well as in Order Entry Mode placing orders directly on-line to foreign brokers, members of international exchanges.

== Business Game ==
In February 2008 Proton Bank and Business Player magazine organized the first business game in Greece. A number of magazine's subscribers were "contesting" in a virtual ATHEX stock market with a prize of the profits of their virtual portfolio.

== See also ==
- List of banks in Greece
- List of companies listed on the Athens Stock Exchange
