= Direktna Banka =

Serbian banking and financial services company

- Trade name: Direktna Banka
- Type: Public
- Industry: Financial services
- Founded: 17 April 1995
- Defunct: 10 December 2021
- Successor: Eurobank Direktna a.d.
- Headquarters: Bulevar Kraljice Marije 54b, Kragujevac, Serbia
- Area served: Serbia
- Key people: Dragan Lazarević (CEO)
- Products: Commercial banking, Investment banking
- Net income: ▲€53.48 million (2018)
- Total assets: ▲€503.42 million (2018)
- Total equity: ▲€86.97 million (2018)
- Owner: Andrej Jovanović (49.99%); Bojan Milovanović (49.98%); Others
- Number of employees: 629 (2018)
- Website: eurobank-direktna.rs

Direktna Banka (Serbian: Директна Банка) was a Serbian bank based in Kragujevac. It ceased with operations in December 2021, after it was merged with the Serbian branch of the Eurobank Ergasias, forming Eurobank Direktna.

== History ==
The origins of the banks date back to 1871 when it was founded in Kingdom of Serbia as "Kragujevačka okružna štedionica". In the beginning, bank served Šumadija region. Over the coming decades its operation was at the mercy of the region's eventful social and geopolitical history.

Following World War II and establishment of Federal People's Republic of Yugoslavia, it re-established operation as "Komunalna banka" in 1955. In 1970, the bank was merged into the state-owned Jugobanka, one of Yugoslavia's main banks at the time.

=== 1991–2016 ===
In July 1991, in the midst of the breakup of Socialist Federal Republic of Yugoslavia, it started operating independently within Jugobanka system as "Jugobanka Jubanka" a.d. Kragujevac. In 2000, Šumadija banka a.d. Kragujevac was merged into the bank.

In June 2001, the Board of bank agreed on the name change, thus adopting the name "Credy banka". In December 2004, Srpska regionalna banka a.d. Beograd was merged into Credy banka, further expanding its network in Serbia.

On 2 September 2013, Credy banka changed its name to "KBM Banka" a.d Kragujevac, due to change in ownership structure.

=== 2016–2021 ===
In February 2016, Serbian businessmen Andrej Jovanović and Bojan Milovanović (former owners and founders of Serbian potato chip food company Marbo Product) bought the KBM Banka from the Slovenian Nova KBM bank. On 8 July 2016, KBM Banka a.d. Kragujevac changed its name into "Direktna Banka" a.d. with headquarters in Kragujevac.

In November 2016, Direktna Banka bought 100% of shares of the Serbian commercial bank Findomestic Bank Serbia from the French BNP Paribas. Findomestic Bank operated in Serbia from 2006 to 2016 and was a leader in car finance loans. After this acquisition, Direktna Banka had around 400 employees and total assets worth around 200 million euros.

In November 2017, Direktna Banka bought another Serbian commercial bank Piraeus Bank Beograd from the Greek Piraeus Bank, for a sum in range of 58–61 million euros. The projections for complete merge to be completed was by the first quarter of 2018, and thus way Direktna Banka would have a total assets worth over 500 million euros.

In July 2021, the Greek Eurobank a.d. and Direktna Banka agreed to merge units on Serbian market by the end of 2021; when complete, the Eurobank would control 70% of shares, while the owners of Direktna Banka would control the remaining 30% of shares of new bank unit. The bank ceased operations and since 13 December 2021, it is merged with the Serbian branch of Eurobank, thus forming Eurobank Direktna.

== See also ==
- List of banks in Yugoslavia
- List of banks in Serbia
