= Demetrios Mantzounis =

Greek banker and business executive

Demetrios Mantzounis is a Greek banker and business executive who is the current CEO of Alpha Bank. He has held the position since 2005, and has been employed with the company since 1973. He holds a political science degree from Aix-Marseille University.
