= Olga Yeritsidou =

Greek educational psychologist, psychosocial researcher, analyst and author

Olga Yeritsidou (Greek: Όλγα Γεριτσίδου; born 1955) is a Greek educational psychologist, psychosocial researcher, analyst and author.

== Biography ==
Yeritsidou was born in Kavala in 1955, the only child of George Geritsidis and his wife Vassiliki, both civil servants. She grew up in Athens where she resides since the age of three. Her father is the main factor in her upbringing and socialization, teaching and instilling in her the concept of social duty and the obligation of man in the amelioration of the social whole, aiming at the daily well-being of absolutely every individual within a state of freedom and Justice.

The assassination of her father on November 17, 1973, as well as his citation as one of the official victims of the Polytechnic uprising along with the various incongruencies in the consequences of his death, constituted the point of assuming responsibility to further her father's work and achieve Justice. The trial of the Polytechnic gives her vivid experiences not only during the pre-trial under prosecutor Tsevas but also during the trial itself, where newspapers of the time show her holding the bullet that allegedly killed her father. The sum of these experiences and the subsequent realization of the actual mistrial symbolized by that exact photo are the precursors of her activistic action and research.

She studied psychology during the time where that science was yet in its infancy in Greece (there wasn't even a capacity to obtain a psychology diploma from the Hellenic university) in the American College Deree (1973-1977) with graduate studies at McGill University, Canada (1978-1982) in the Educational Psychology and Counseling department, where she specialized in the maximization of intelligence and academic competence, in job orientation, involving educational curricula and psychosocial research, with special focus in the management of the dynamics of the family.

Since her return to Greece she has been working on the amelioration of the quality of education for children of lower and middle socioeconomic classes so that they may have access to the same level of education as that of the higher and highest socioeconomic classes. This effort of hers to improve the socioeconomic status (SES) of the Greeks with an aim of equating them with the higher social strata at least where education, cultivation and occupational potential are concerned was severely fought against with every means possible by the social, state and political mechanism of post-dictatorship (tagged "Metapolitefsi" in Greek historical terms).

With the fall of the post-dictatorship (Metapolitefsi) era and the onset of the Memorandum years she has launched a social and legal activism defending the Human Rights of the average Greek Citizen as well as the Constitutional sense of a State of Justice, while at the same time making detailed and in depth analyses of a sociopolitical nature regarding the economic and social forces that brought about this state in Greece, through the prism of social psychology and person-centered approach.

She has a daughter, Tanya Maria Geritsidou with whom she cooperates closely on every endeavour.

== Scientific work ==
She has developed her own theory of educational psychology and psychosocial development of the individual, which focuses on the arrest and reversal of the constraints in intelligence and motivation in every age, explaining thus and having capacity to intervene and fully reverse the sum of the so-called ‘learning difficulties/dyslexia’ symptoms as well as most complexes and problems in behavior and personality.

Part of her career is the application of this theory on children of pre-school age (especially during the period when she presided over the educational curricula of the kindergarten of the Commercial Bank of Greece from 1983 to 1984), of school age and adolescence up to adults. This method and her theory, during its application in her own educational facility during the years 1986 – 2006 essentially made possible the advancement of every individual regardless of initial SES to the top 5% of the population educationally, thus changing the profile of learning and class organization/ class curricula in her local area.

This twenty year activity in research and theory application led to the writing-designing of textbooks derived not only from her theoretical basis but also from the practical application of teaching, so that the education professional will be facilitated in his/her task regardless of awareness of the psychological principles behind these textbooks and so maximize the achievement of the student.

Especially regarding the stages of introduction of a student to a new learning area, she designed along with her daughter various educational methods of speedy learning with therapeutic and developmental effects on the individual so that either any learning difficulties will be reversed or in lieu of such conditions, completely avoid the risk of development of such symptomatology.

Also, she has developed diagnostic tools of Psychometrics for the mapping of emotional and cognitive condition of the individual and the detection of complexes and other problems should there exist any.

She is a full member of the psychological associations of Greece (ΣΕΨ), America (APA).

== Publications ==
In her thesis “Factors Affecting the Occupational Expectations of Adolescents of Greek Descent” she performs full analysis, mapping and evaluation of the factors affecting the selection of occupation among Greeks of the Diaspora.

In her book “Remember me Regarding Education”, which is a popularized scientific study and mapping of the educational system and situation in Greece as well as internationally, the explanation of how the educational system works today is presented, along with why and how a parent, educator or student can cope with and navigate to the traps and challenges existing therein.

In the booklet “Stigmata” there is presented a basic analysis of orientation so that the average individual may acquire the capacity to ameliorate every facet of his/her life and assorted relationships and endeavours until self-actualization.

Also she has written several social studies and articles on education that have been published in the press as well as political science and social psychology analyses published in various newspapers and the internet.

== Activism ==
The lack of a State of Justice and the assault of every element potentially threatening the condition of corruption, non-transparency and closed non-meritocratic circuits of the political circles of the post-dictatorship era in Greece forced her to deal with corruption through legal activism, a term she coined along with her daughter in order to describe the official demand for application of the Law according to the order prescribed by International Law, according to which every law going against the Human Rights and basic National/political/personal Constitutional Rights of man must be abolished.

The method of civil disobedience of Thoreau but also the basic principles of the Ancient Greek Democratic State are merged with the principles of the Christian dogma within her activistic rhetoric, which is person centered, against the concept of compromise and ascribing great value to the concepts of a State of Justice, Equality before Law, Equality before the State and above all the individuality and defense of the personality and existence of every individual.

In 2007 she officially begins her activity as a social activist with the Declaration against the Unjust state and her objection to the manner of handling the Macedonia naming dispute, as a Greek Citizen born in the province of Macedonia. The answer she received in her written protests from the E.U. regarding the inability of the E.U. to intervene in mediation for the naming dispute predated the matching appeal by the then Republic of Macedonia PM and thus forced an identical answer to him as well.

In 2008, after a spoken statement to her personally by the then PM K. Karamanlis that he was not interested in upholding the Hellenic Constitution, she files charges against him on High Treason.

In 2009, during the pre-election period that yielded G. A. Papandreou in the PM seat, realizing not only the real situation in Greece but also the level of risk posed by G. A. Papandreou based on his pre-election campaign program she sent him letters warning him of the imminent danger for Greece as well as the implausibility of his program, on which G. A. Papandreou refuses to reply even after an injunction filed against him to force him to do so, claiming governmental action and that he is above the law, something the court did not accept.

With the onset of political events in Greece leading up to the Memorandum, and given the capacity to legally prove malicious intent, she filed a lawsuit against the PM G. A. Papandreou and his cabinet on High Treason.

As the humanitarian crisis in Greece advanced along with the fall of the essential sovereignty of the Greek State and the illegal refusal of the justice system in Greece to follow established basic due process regarding these legal moves, for the first time in European history, she and her daughter file a complaint, as simple Citizens, to the ICC at the Hague via the procedure of article 15 of the Rome Statute, reporting crimes against humanity and genocide during times of peace at the expense of the Greek People, substantiating the claims with hard data and evidence

This action of hers was followed and imitated by other Citizens as well, while the support in her endeavour with the sending of written letters of appeal for support to the prosecutor of the ICC was huge, as reported by international mass media.

The prosecutor of the ICC filed a case for crimes against humanity and genocide during times of peace at the expense of the Greek People and Greece due to governmental policies since 2009.
