= John Markopoulos =

Greek businessman

John Markopoulos (1951–2004) was a Greek businessman. He was majority shareholder of Proton Bank.

== Life ==
Markopoulos studied at the University of Thessalonica, and graduate studies (MBA) at the INSEAD University in Fontainebleau, France. He worked as a financial analyst in Steyr-Daimler-Puch in Vienna and as a manager in Chase Manhattan Bank in London.

In 1990, he founded Sigma Securities S.A. where he held the positions of chairman and managing director until the year 2000, when the company was acquired by Piraeus Bank. Sigma Securities was the first private societe anonyme securities house in Greece, and became the top ranked securities house in the domestic market.

In 2001, Markopoulos co-founded the Proton Bank group, a specialised financial services group engaging in the provision of investment and asset management services.
