= Tanya Maria Geritsidou =

Greek psychopedagogue, writer and activist

Tanya Maria Geritsidou (Greek: Τάνυα Μαρία Γεριτσίδου) (born 1978) (nom de plume Tantz Aerine) is a Greek psychopedagogue, artist, author, publisher and activist. She invests in the cultivation of the humanitarian and philhellenic spirit through legal action of international range, literature and scripts, as well as art works.

== Early life ==
Geritsidou was born in Montreal, Quebec, Canada and grew up in Athens, Greece from age four. Her mother was Olga G. Yeritsidou. She raised her daughter with a strong sense of social responsibility and independence. Her mother emphasized the value of a sociopolitical identity as a means to self-actualization, and as a guarantee of valuing global heritage.

She has degrees in psychology and education. Her focus was on the effect of fear in awareness, critical thought and memory. She has contributed to the development of educational methods for overcoming learning difficulties and the development of intelligence and motivation.

She wrote language learning textbooks, grammar textbooks and composition textbooks. As a psychopedagogue, she has used art therapy and role playing as well as other methods of fear dissipation and confidence bolstering. She created award-winning theatrical plays and songs for children and adolescents. She designed a prototype composite class of non-similar children (in age and educational levels) and the method of introducing new learning objectives to it. Her goal was to prepare them for healthy inclusion in society and to cultivate the ability to adjust while developing intelligence and maturity, according to the principles of Vygotsky’s zone of proximal development (ZPD), along with the removal of inhibitions in intelligence developed initially by her mother.om

She owns Mindpower, a small press publishing house.

== Works ==
Aside from her scholarly work, she has written fiction. She wrote the is fantasy trilogy The Art of Veiling, the novel Wood to Glass and several short stories and vignettes. She wrote scripts for short films and theatrical plays awarded for their innovative nature.

She is attempting to spread the modern Greek spirit, culture and history, including modern Greek history, especially the actions of the Greeks during WWII. Geritsidou creates webcomics and accompanying informative articles.

== Activism ==
She learned to be an activist from her mother. She acquired basic knowledge on local and international law via self teaching, scientific research land life experience. She found that average citizens can file complaints with the International Criminal Court (ICC) when crimes are large scale and committed by a’ government. In October 2011, Geritsidou and her mother filed a complaint against the Papandreou government, reporting crimes against humanity and genocide, becoming the first Greek citizens and European non-ranked citizens to file against the Memorandum and related policies. This action was supported by the Greek people and the Greek Diaspora, but was rejected by political circles in Greece. As a result of this complaint, the ICC prosecutor opened a file for gathering evidence, stating that when the evidence is compelling, the ICC would intervene, validating the admissibility of this move. Two additional complaints were filed by other Greek citizens.
