= Millennium Bank (Greece) =

Greek bank

Millennium Bank AE
- Trade name: Millennium Bank
- Native name: Τράπεζα Millennium Bank Ανώνυμη Εταιρία
- Company type: Anonymi Etairia
- Industry: Financial services
- Founded: 14 June 2000
- Defunct: June 2013
- Fate: Acquired by Piraeus Bank
- Headquarters: Kallithea, Attica, Greece
- Number of locations: 120 branches (2012)
- Area served: Greece
- Products: Commercial banking
- Parent: Piraeus Bank
- Website: millenniumbank.gr

Millennium Bank was a Greek bank that was headquartered in Kallithea, in Athens metropolitan area. It was founded in 2000 as Nova Bank, but on 10 November 2006 was renamed to Millennium Bank, in order to conform with the worldwide "Millennium" brand of its then parent company Millennium BCP (Banco Comercial Português) of Portugal.

In June 2013, Millennium Bank was bought by Piraeus Bank. Its operations were merged into Piraeus Bank's in December 2013.

== See also ==
- List of banks in Greece
