= Betty Behrens =

British historian and academic

C. B. A. Behrens
- Born: Catherine Betty Abigail Behrens; 24 April 1904; London, England
- Died: 3 January 1989 (aged 84)

Academic background
- Education: Lady Margaret Hall, Oxford; Radcliffe College

Academic work
- Discipline: Historian
- Sub-discipline: Early modern Europe; Ancien Régime
- Institutions: Bedford College, London; University College, Oxford; Newnham College, Cambridge; Faculty of History, University of Cambridge; Clare Hall, Cambridge

Catherine Betty Abigail Behrens (24 April 1904 – 3 January 1989), known as Betty Behrens (or Jane to friends) and published as C. B. A. Behrens, was a British historian and academic. Her early interests included Henry VIII, Charles II, and the early modern period of English history. She later focused her research on the Ancien Régime (the Kingdom of France from the Middle Ages to the French Revolution). She was elected a Fellow of Newnham College, Cambridge in 1935. She became a Fellow of Clare Hall, Cambridge after the publication of The Ancien Régime (1967). She "achieved an international reputation" with The Ancien Régime, with reviews describing it as "remarkable and absorbing" and "a lively, thought-provoking essay in historical revision".

== Early life and education ==
Behrens was born on 24 April 1904 in London, England. Her father was Noel Edward Behrens (1879–1967), a Jewish civil servant and banker who had inherited a large amount of money from his father. Her mother Vivien Behrens (1880–1961), the daughter of Sir Cecil Coward, was brought up as a Christian. She was educated at home by a series of governesses and never attended school. She spoke French and English from an early age and later added German. According to Behrens, she had learned French so early because her mother didn't believe novels should be read before lunch, but she was prepared to make an exception for novels in French.

In 1925, Behrens matriculated into Lady Margaret Hall, Oxford with a scholarship to study History. She graduated in 1927 with a first class Bachelor of Arts (BA) degree. In 1928 she was awarded a Commonwealth Fellowship to Radcliffe College, a women's liberal arts college that was part of Harvard University in Cambridge, Massachusetts, United States.

== Academic career ==
After her return to the United Kingdom, Behrens held research posts at Bedford College, London (now Royal Holloway, University of London) and at University College, Oxford. In 1935, she was elected a Fellow of Newnham College, Cambridge. Additionally, she was appointed an assistant lecturer in the Faculty of History, University of Cambridge in 1938 and promoted to lecturer the following year. Behrens was just 34 years old when she was promoted to lecturer, and she was therefore one of a remarkable group of successful women academics of the early part of the twentieth century. Her research in the mid-1930s was focused on Henry VIII, and she published academic papers on this period including on his divorce and on resident diplomats. Her interests moved to later English history and in 1941 she published an article on Charles II.

Behrens lectured in a hat - always a stylish one - not because of idiosyncrasy or vanity, but because when Behrens lectured at Cambridge, women were not full members of the University, and were therefore not entitled to lecture in academic gowns. The two colleges for women, Newnham and Girton, decided a dress-code for female lecturers which included hats. As Virginia Woolf explained, it was an important statement about uniforms and professional status. Women were only admitted to become full members of Cambridge University in 1948, and was the last university in the UK to do so.

Behrens taught the journalist Joan Bakewell History at Newnham College. Bakewell has written about the lasting impression Behrens made on her, describing her as 'wise' and 'clever': 'Betty Behrens was equally formidable: tall, with long legs, she was the nearest the college came to chic. Her room was bright, full of flowers and an array of mustard-coloured cushions. She taught European history (in her 60s, she would marry the historian EH Carr).' Bakewell identified Behrens' refusal to mark her essay on the French Revolution ('worthless, trite rubbish') as a moment that changed her. Bakewell identifies Behrens' harsh and unmediated judgement as ultimately making her a better journalist.

Gill Sutherland has described Behrens as:

generous, friendly, always ready to discuss not only historical but also contemporary political issues. She was forthright and crisp, and always terrifyingly well informed. She was then exactly as her own teacher, Evelyn Jamison, had described her in a reference as far back as 1935: "She was a 'hard' and virile mind, & tolerates nothing blurred or slovenly in her own thought or that of others." These qualities made her a considerable controversialist, not always comfortably so.

Of herself in a letter, Behrens wrote: "I just don't do my job nearly as well as many did. It would have been nice to be Voltaire." Betty Behrens was appointed to her lectureship in 1938 and was therefore one of that remarkable group of successful women academics of the early part of this century. In the 1970s she became concerned at the decline in the numbers of women on the Faculty of History and began to gather evidence on the numbers of women employed and appointed to lectureships. At least part of her concern was with the waste or underemployment of human resources - put crudely she believed that many of the women without official lectureships were better teachers than the men who held them.

As did many academics, Behrens offered her services to the government during the Second World War, and was desperate to contribute to the war effort. She struggled to secure a secondment from Cambridge for war work. The History Faculty, particularly Herbert Butterfield, resisted, arguing that her teaching and examining were indispensable. Nevertheless, she left academia in 1942 to work on Lend-Lease in the Cabinet Office, Whitehall. The Lend-Lease Act was passed on March 11, 1941, which set up a system that would allow the United States to lend or lease war supplies to any nation deemed "vital to the defense of the United States." For the rest of the war, Behrens worked as an official historian for the Ministry of Shipping. Behrens supported and encouraged Eva Wittenberg (née Rhoden), a refugee from Vienna, from the late 1930s onwards. After the war ended, she spent ten years researching and writing an analysis of the role of British-controlled merchant ships during the war for the official History of the Second World War. She struggled to finish her book, Merchant Shipping and the Demands of War, because of her Cambridge commitments and demands. This book was published in 1955.

Behrens turned to a new topic, the French Ancien Régime and the French Revolution. She wrote attacks on the prevailing Marxist view of the causes of the revolution. In 1967, she published her magnum opus, The Ancien Régime. The book brought her short-term fame and a place among the Anglo-American intellectual élite. That year, she moved from Newnham College to Clare Hall, a newly founded postgraduate-only college of the University of Cambridge. In the 1970s Behrens was alarmed at the decline in the numbers of women on the History Faculty and began to gather evidence on the numbers of women employed and appointed to lectureships. At least part of her concern was with the waste or underemployment of human resources - put crudely she believed that many of the women without official lectureships were better teachers than the men who held them.

She retired from full-time academia in 1972, but continued to be an active academic as the first emeritus fellow to be appointed by Clare Hall, from 1972 to 1986. Her final book, Society, Government and the Enlightenment: The Experiences of Eighteenth-Century France and Prussia, was published in 1985 when Behrens she was eighty-one. Behrens left all of her books to Newnham College Library. Her archive is held by the Churchill Archives Centre at Cambridge, and consists of reading notes on both European and British history as well as historiography and other subjects; notes and offprints from Behrens's own writing and publications, on European and British history and also historiography; some reviews; correspondence relating to Behrens's work, Including with Herbert Butterfield, G. M. Trevelyan and Harold Temperley; lecture notes; some personal material, including sketches and notes for an autobiography, typed and handwritten reminiscences about people, places, events, some very personal; papers relating to the work of Behrens’ husband E.H. Carr. Behrens' archive consists of nineteen boxes, and is uncatalogued.

== Honours ==
The Betty Behrens Seminar on Classics of Historiography was established at Clare Hall, University of Cambridge, in Behrens' honour. The recurring seminar offers a unique opportunity for students and scholars to reflect on great historical works and engage in discussion with renowned experts. Speakers include Professor Amira K. Bennison on Muqaddimah (1377) by Ibn Khaldun and Professor Paul Cartledge on Histories by Herodotus of Halicarnassus.

== Personal life ==
In 1966, Behrens married E. H. Carr, a fellow historian and former diplomat. At the age of 74, Carr was twelve older than Behrens, who was 62 on marrying. This was his third marriage, and her first. Carr had a son from his first marriage. The last years of Behrens' marriage to Carr were not happy, and by the time of his death in 1982 they had been living apart for a number of years. Carr's misogyny and poor treatment of women has been variously noted, including by Norman Stone: 'There were three Mrs Carrs (not one, as the Times obituary claimed), and each marriage ended in hideous circumstances: one wife was left when she already had terminal cancer, another abandoned, when Carr was almost ninety, because she was ‘depressing’.' In 1947, Carr had lost his Chair at Aberystwyth University following objections about his affair with one (or perhaps more) of professors’ wives. Behrens attended his memorial service, along with only two of his PhD students.

Behrens died on 3 January 1989.

== Selected works ==
- Behrens, C. B. A. (1955). Merchant shipping and the demands of war. London: Her Majesty's Stationery Office.
- Behrens, C. B. A. (1967). The Ancien Régime. London: Thames and Hudson. ISBN 978-0500330067.
- Behrens, C. B. A. (1985). Society, government, and the Enlightenment: the experiences of eighteenth-century France and Prussia. London: Thames and Hudson. ISBN 978-0500250907.
