= Michalis Sallas =

Greek businessman, banker and academic (born 1950)

- Born: 1950 (age 74–75); Heraklion, Crete, Greece
- Education: University of Athens, University of Heidelberg
- Occupation(s): Banker, businessman

Michalis Georgios Sallas (Greek: Μιχάλης Γεωργίος Σάλλας; born 1950) is a Greek businessman, banker and academic, who has been Chairman of Piraeus Bank (today Greece's largest) from 1991, to 2016.

The Piraeus Group is the parent company of a large financial organisation in Greece, with important subsidiary companies in Greece and many subsidiary banks abroad. Sallas is regarded as one of the most powerful tycoons in the Greek economy.

== Early life and education ==
Sallas is a Cretan; he was born in Heraklion in 1950. He graduated from the University of Athens with a degree in economics, and did postgraduate studies in Germany (then West Germany), obtaining a PhD in economics and statistics from the University of Heidelberg.

== Career ==
He began his academic career in Germany, as a researcher in Heidelberg University's Institute of International Comparative Statistics. He has also taught economics and econometrics at the University of Athens and at Panteion University.

Sallas was actively involved in politics as a supporter of Andreas Papandreou, a socialist politician who served for many years as Greece's Prime Minister; in 1974, Sallas was a founding member of PASOK, Papandreou's party. In successive Papandreou governments, he served as General Secretary of the Ministry of Commerce, Governor of the Hellenic Industrial Development Bank, economic advisor to the Prime Minister and chairman of the committee for the modernization of the Greek banking system, among other positions.

Sallas became Chairman of Piraeus Bank after the right-wing government of the conservative New Democracy party decided to privatize it in 1991. He persuaded a group of powerful businessmen to buy the bank and appoint him its chairman; since that time, Piraeus Bank has expanded aggressively, both in Greece and internationally, and today is Greece's 4th largest bank.
