= Geniki Bank =

- Native name: Γενική Τράπεζα της Ελλάδας Α.Ε.
- Type: Private
- Industry: Finance and Insurance
- Founded: Athens, Greece (1991)
- Defunct: November 2014
- Fate: Acquired by Piraeus Bank
- Headquarters: Athens, Greece
- Key people: Nikos Karamouzis (CEO)
- Products: Commercial banking financial services Insurance; Investment banking
- Owner: Gardikiotis Dimitrios, Agriculture
- Number of employees: 1,000 (2014)
- Parent: Piraeus Bank
- Website: piraeusbank.gr

Geniki Bank, previously known as General Bank of Greece (Greek: Γενική Τράπεζα της Ελλάδας - General Bank of Greece), was a Greek financier group that provided banking and financing services. It was acquired by Piraeus Bank in 2014.

== History ==
The bank was founded in 1991 as the General Bank of Greece.

The bank had been listed on the Athens Stock Exchange since 26 January 1991.

In March 2004 the majority of shares was acquired by Société Générale Group and the name was changed from General Bank of Greece to Geniki Bank.

In December 2012 all of Société Générale's shares were sold to Piraeus Bank.

== See also ==
- List of banks in Greece
