= Omega Bank =

Greek banking service

- Company type: Private
- Founded: 2001
- Headquarters: Athens, Greece
- Products: Commercial banking
- Website: www.omegabank.gr

The Omega Bank was a Greek banking service until it was bought by Proton Bank in October 2006. The bank was named after the last letter of the Greek alphabet (see omega). Omega Bank was one of the earliest banks in Greece to offer e-banking.

== See also ==
- List of banks in Greece
