= Viva Wallet Group =

Greek Neobank

Viva Wallet Holdings
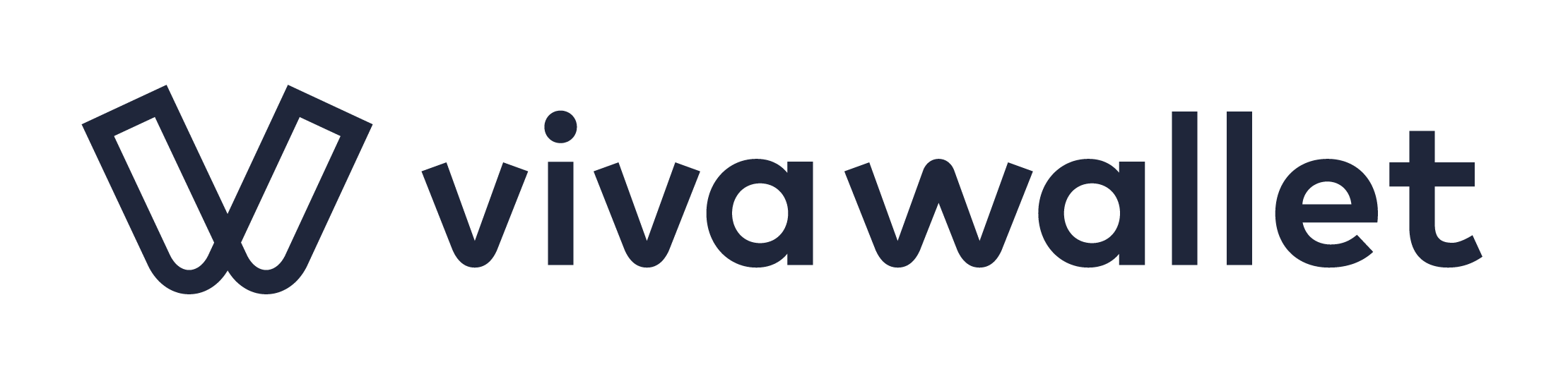
- Type: Private
- Industry: Neobank
- Founded: 2000
- Founders: Haris Karonis; Makis Antypas
- Headquarters: Athens, Greece
- Key people: Haris Karonis (CEO)
- Owner: Viva Wallet Holdings Software Development (51.5%); JPMorgan Chase (48.5%)
- Number of employees: 427 (2020)
- Subsidiaries: Vivabank; Viva Services; Viva Payment Services
- Website: viva.com

Viva.com is a Greek tech bank for businesses with presence in 29 European countries. In January 2022, Viva.com became the first Greek unicorn startup company after an agreement with JP Morgan Chase was announced.

== History ==
In 2000, Haris Karonis founded Realize SA in Athens, Greece, which initially operated as a software house. In 2006, Viva Services was founded and entered the voice over IP business and later travel services, followed in 2010 by an expansion to the e-ticketing market. In 2011, Haris Karonis and Makis Antypas founded Viva Payments, which is licensed as a payment institution for the European Economic Area, following the transposition of the PSD2 in the Greek institutional framework.

Three years later, in 2014, the company obtained an Electronic Money Association License and announced the completion of its Series A round funding round, led by the Latsis family office.

In 2020, Viva Wallet expanded its services to 23 European countries. On August 3 of the same year, the company announced the acquisition of the banking license of Praxia Bank. Vivabank is a credit institution licensed and supervised by the Bank of Greece.

In 2021, Viva Wallet announced the completion of its Series D funding round, led by Tencent, the European Bank for Reconstruction and Development (EBRD), as well as Jim Breyer’s Breyer Capital.

In January 2022, JPMorgan Chase announced that it was to buy a 48.5% stake in Viva Wallet Holdings Software Development S.A.

In February 2025, Viva.com merged Viva Payments into VivaBank.

In 2026, Viva.com launched operations in 5 more European countries [ Latvia, Lithuania, Slovenia, Slovakia, and Estonia] reaching a total number of 29 countries, including all 27 members of EAA plus the UK and Norway.

== See also ==
- List of banks in Greece
