= Ethniki Hellenic General Insurance Company =

- Native name: Α.Ε.Ε.Γ.Α "Η Εθνική"
- Company type: Public
- Industry: Insurance
- Founded: 15 June 1891; 135 years ago
- Headquarters: Athens, Greece
- Owner: Piraeus Bank
- Website: ethnikiasfalistiki.gr

Ethniki Hellenic General Insurance Company (Greek: Ανώνυμος Ελληνική Εταιρία Γενικών Ασφαλειών "Η Εθνική") known in its acronym A.E.E.G.A. "Ethniki" is a Greek insurance company.

== History ==
It was founded on 15 June 1891 through the Government Gazette (Government Gazette A 177/1891). Its headquarters are located at 103-105 Syngrou Avenue in Athens.

It was founded under the name "Ethniki" on 15 June 1891 through the Government Gazette (Government Gazette A 177/1891).

Ethniki Insurance operates in all insurance sectors, with its main activity in insurance sectors other than life insurance. The company's subsidiaries are National Insurance of Cyprus Ltd and National General Insurance of Cyprus Ltd, while it itself is a subsidiary (i.e. has as its parent) the investment company/group CVC Capital Partners since 31 March 2022. From its establishment until its transfer to CVC, National Insurance belonged to the National Bank of Greece.

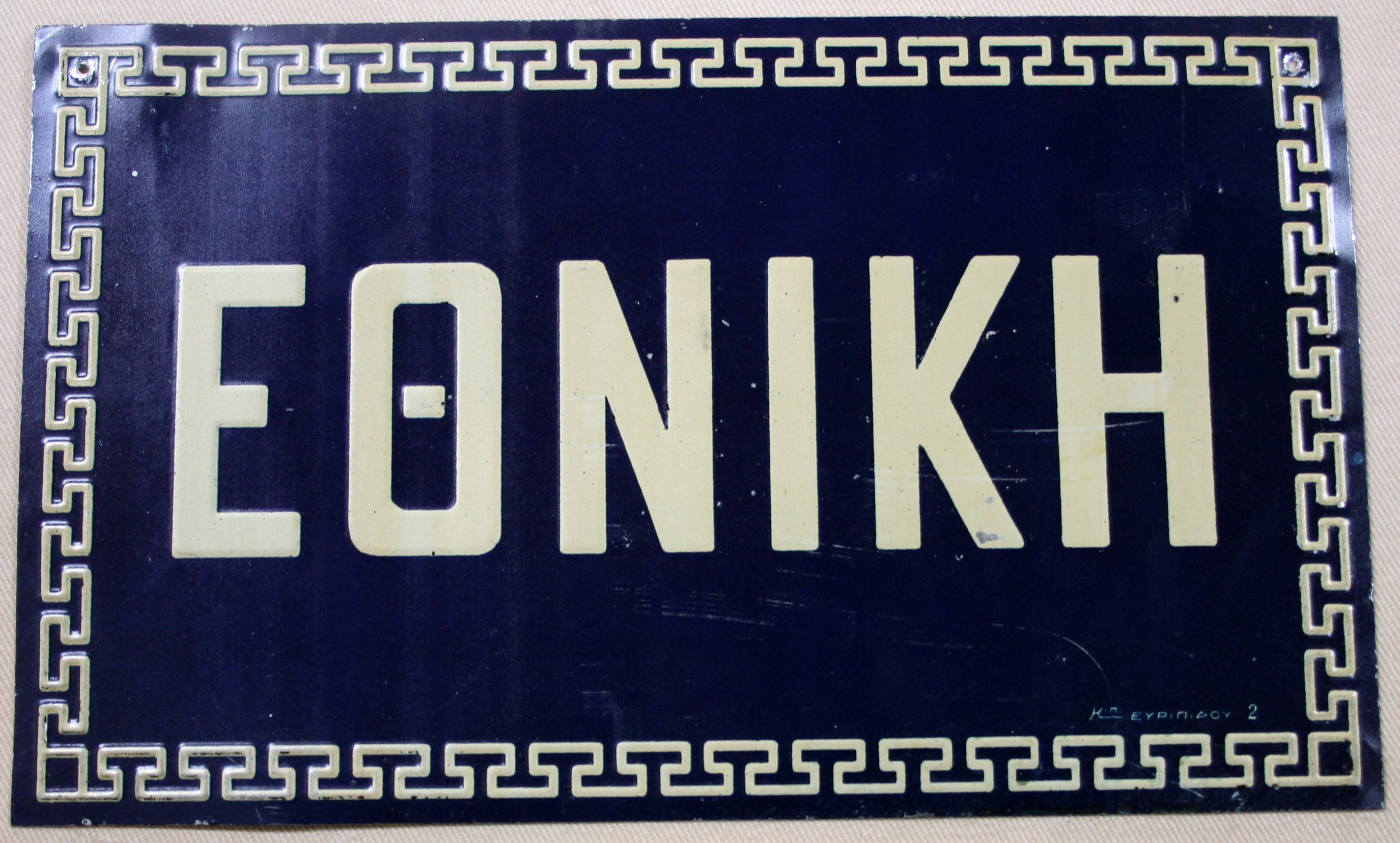
Fire insurance mark of Ethniki on display in museum

As of 30 March 2021, the company had 13 administrative branches, 676 employees and over 1 million customers, according to a publication by the Athens Chamber of Commerce.

In December 2024, based on its annual financial report, the company had over 600 employees and 1.8 million customers.

In March 2025, Piraeus Bank bought Ethniki for €600 million, the acquisition was finalized in November 2025.
