= T Bank =

TBank
- Type: Bank
- Predecessor: Aspis Bank (Ασπίς Τράπεζα)
- Founded: 1992 – Acquisition by TT Hellenic Postbank 2010
- Headquarters: Athens, Greece
- Website: www.aspisbank.gr

The logo of the bank before the rebranding

TBank (formerly Aspis Bank - Greek: Ασπίς Τράπεζα) was a commercial bank in Greece. Its headquarters were in Athens and it had 72 branches across Greece as of September 2008. The bank was being traded on the Athens Stock Exchange.

Aspis Bank was rebranded as TBank on 20 July 2010, following its acquisition by TT Hellenic Postbank (Greek: Ταχυδρομικό Ταμιευτήριο)

In 2013, the Eurobank Group acquired “New TT Hellenic Postbank S.A”. The operational merger of New TT Hellenic Postbank was completed in May 2014, with the integration of former T Bank systems.

== See also ==
- List of banks in Greece
