= Elias Lianos =

Greek businessman

- Occupation: Businessman
- Organization(s): Proton Bank; Panionios B.C.
- Known for: Founder, CEO and major shareholder of Proton Bank

Elias Lianos is a Greek businessman. He was the founder, CEO and major shareholder of Proton Bank, which is headquartered in Athens, Greece. He was also the president and owner of Panionios B.C., the Athens-based Greek Basket League club.
