= FBBank =

FBB - First Business Bank SA
- Native name: FBB - Πρώτη Επιχειρηματική Τράπεζα A.E.
- Company type: Anonymi Etairia
- Industry: Financial services
- Founded: Greece (November 2001)
- Defunct: May 11, 2013
- Fate: Dissolved
- Headquarters: Athens, Greece
- Number of locations: 19 branches (2013)
- Area served: Greece
- Key people: Victor Restis
- Number of employees: ▼258 (2011); 271 (2010)
- Parent: National Bank of Greece
- Subsidiaries: FB Insurance Agents SA (FB Ασφαλιστική Πρακτόρευση Α.Ε.)
- Website: www.fbbank.gr

First Business Bank, also known as FBBank, was a commercial bank that offered financial services to individuals, professionals and businesses in Greece. It was founded in November 2001 and bought the Greek network of Bank of Nova Scotia. The license of FBBank was revoked on 11 May 2013 and its assets and liabilities were bought by National Bank of Greece.

== See also ==
- List of banks in Greece
