= Piraeus Bank (Serbia) =

Serbian subsidiary of Piraeus Bank

- Native name: Pireus banka/ Пиреус банка
- Formerly: Atlas Bank
- Type: Joint-stock company
- Industry: Financial services
- Founded: May 2005 (Last form); 8 August 1995; 31 years ago (Originally founded)
- Defunct: 26 October 2018
- Fate: Merged into Direktna Banka
- Successor: Direktna Banka
- Headquarters: Belgrade, Serbia
- Area served: Serbia
- Key people: Neoclis Neocleous (CEO)
- Products: Commercial banking, Investment banking
- Revenue: ▼€1.376 billion (2016)
- Operating income: ▼€428.65 million (2016)
- Net income: ▲€25.91 million (2016)
- Total assets: ▼€52.24 million (2016)
- Total equity: ▲€12.331 million (2016)
- Number of employees: 547
- Website: piraeusbank.rs

Piraeus Bank a.d. Beograd, was a Serbian bank that existed from May 2005 until October 2018 when it was acquired by Direktna Banka. It was majority owned by Greek Piraeus Bank. Its particular activities were in the areas of large corporate banking, retail banking and SMEs.

== History ==
Piraeus Bank started its operations in the Serbian market with a network of 9 branches and 176 employees. Today, the Bank has a business network of 34 branches, approximately 550 employees, it has developed sector of Piraeus Leasing and Piraeus Rent, and tens of thousands of clients.

In November 2017, Direktna Banka bought Piraeus Bank Beograd from the Greek Piraeus Bank, for a sum in the range of 58–61 million euros. The complete merge is expected to be completed by the first quarter of 2018, and thus way Direktna Banka would have a total equity worth over 500 million euros.

== See also ==
- List of banks in Serbia
