= Ionian Bank =

Former Greek bank

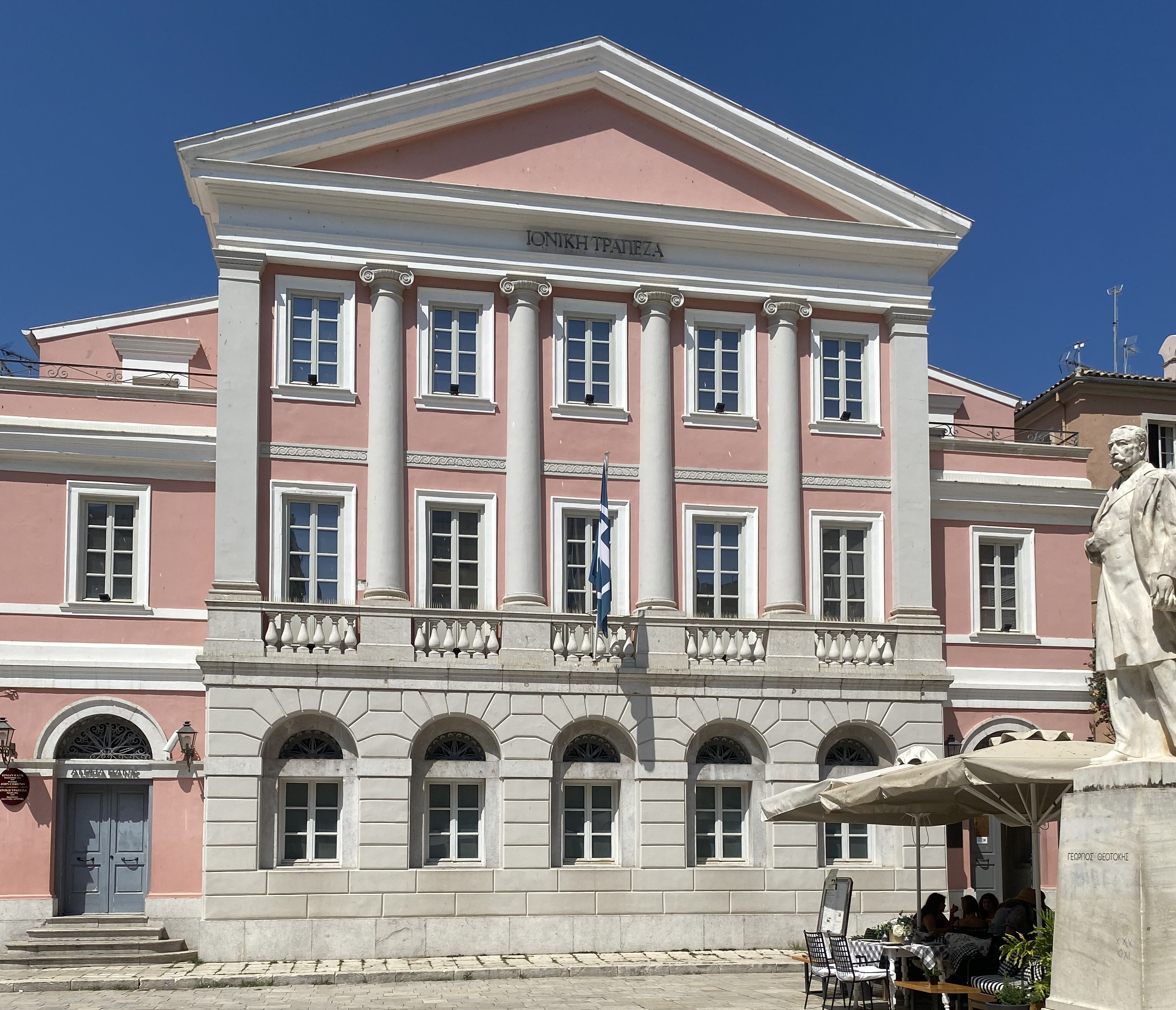
Historic Ionian Bank building in Corfu designed by architect Ioannis Chornis and completed in 1846, lately Banknote Museum of Alpha Bank, with statue of Georgios Theotokis in the foreground

Former Ionian Bank head office building in Athens, erected 1911-1916 and subsequently expanded, lately a branch of Alpha Bank

The Ionian Bank was a bank of issue established in 1839 in London to operate in the United States of the Ionian Islands, which was then a British protectorate. The bank moved its head office in Greece from Corfu to Athens in 1873, and expanded in Greece and the Eastern Mediterranean, including through the acquisition of Greece's Popular Bank in 1938. After losing its branches in Egypt to nationalization in 1956, the British parent entity sold its operations outside the United Kingdom. The Greek business, renamed Ionian and Popular Bank and nationalized in 1975, was eventually absorbed into Alpha Bank in 2000.

== Bank of issue ==
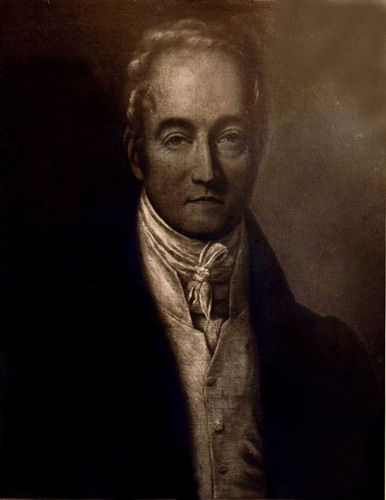
Sir Howard Douglas (1776-1861) played a key role in the creation of the Ionian Bank

At the initiative of Lord High Commissioner of the Ionian Islands Howard Douglas, and following earlier failed attempts in 1833 and 1837, a resolution of the Senate of the Ionian Islands established the Ionian State Bank on 23 October 1839, primarily to finance trade between the islands and Great Britain. It opened operations in Corfu on 1 March 1840, making it the oldest in what is now Greece. The Ionian Bank received a 20-year grant of the exclusive privilege of issuing and circulating banknotes for the Ionian Islands. The bank soon changed its name to Ionian Bank, and initially only operated in the Ionian Islands, opening branches in Corfu, Zakynthos and Kefalonia the following year. It received a British royal charter that clarified its legal structure in 1844. In 1845 it established agencies in Athens and Patras, also appointing agents in Trieste and Venice.

In 1864, the Treaty of London resulted in the union of the Ionian Islands with Greece. A new charter re-established the Ionian Bank as a joint-stock company under Greek law, with the Greek government assuming its debt. That same year, the bank converted its agencies in Athens and Patras into full branches. The Ionian Bank then extended its operations to the rest of Greece. The Athens office took over as Head Office from Corfu in 1873. By 1880 the bank had lost its legal monopoly on banknote issuance in the Ionian Islands, but gained a time extension of its (no longer exclusive) issuance privilege. In 1883, the Ionian Bank gave up its royal charter and registered as a limited liability company. In 1907, it opened its first Egyptian branch in Alexandria.

During World War I, the Ionian Bank served Allied military interests in the Balkans, opening branches at Salonica, Syros, Chios and Mytilene. In 1916, it inaugurated its prominent new head office building designed by architect Anastasios Metaxas on Pesmazoglou Street in Athens.

== Interwar period ==
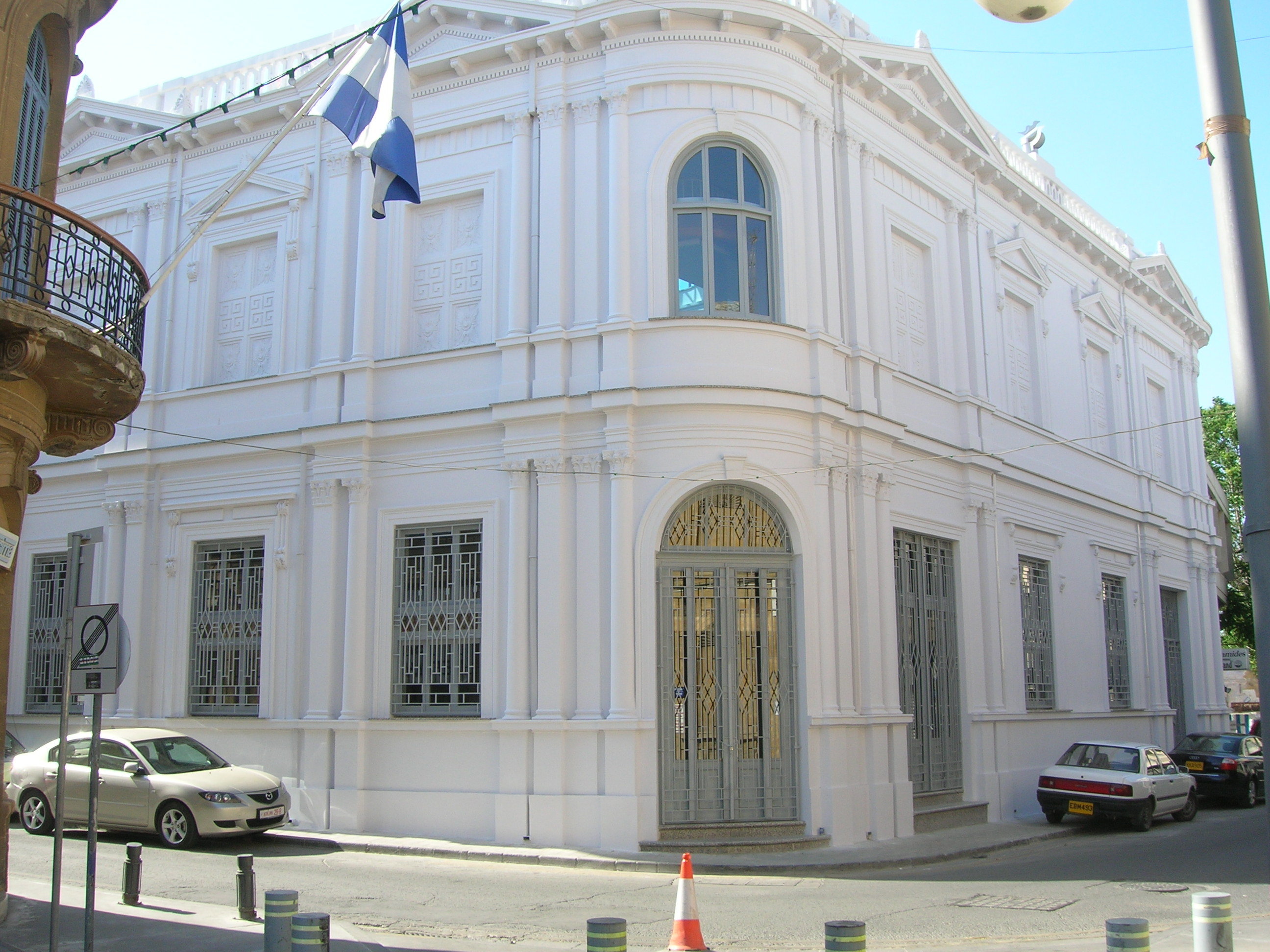
Ionian Bank's former branch in Nicosia, Cyprus

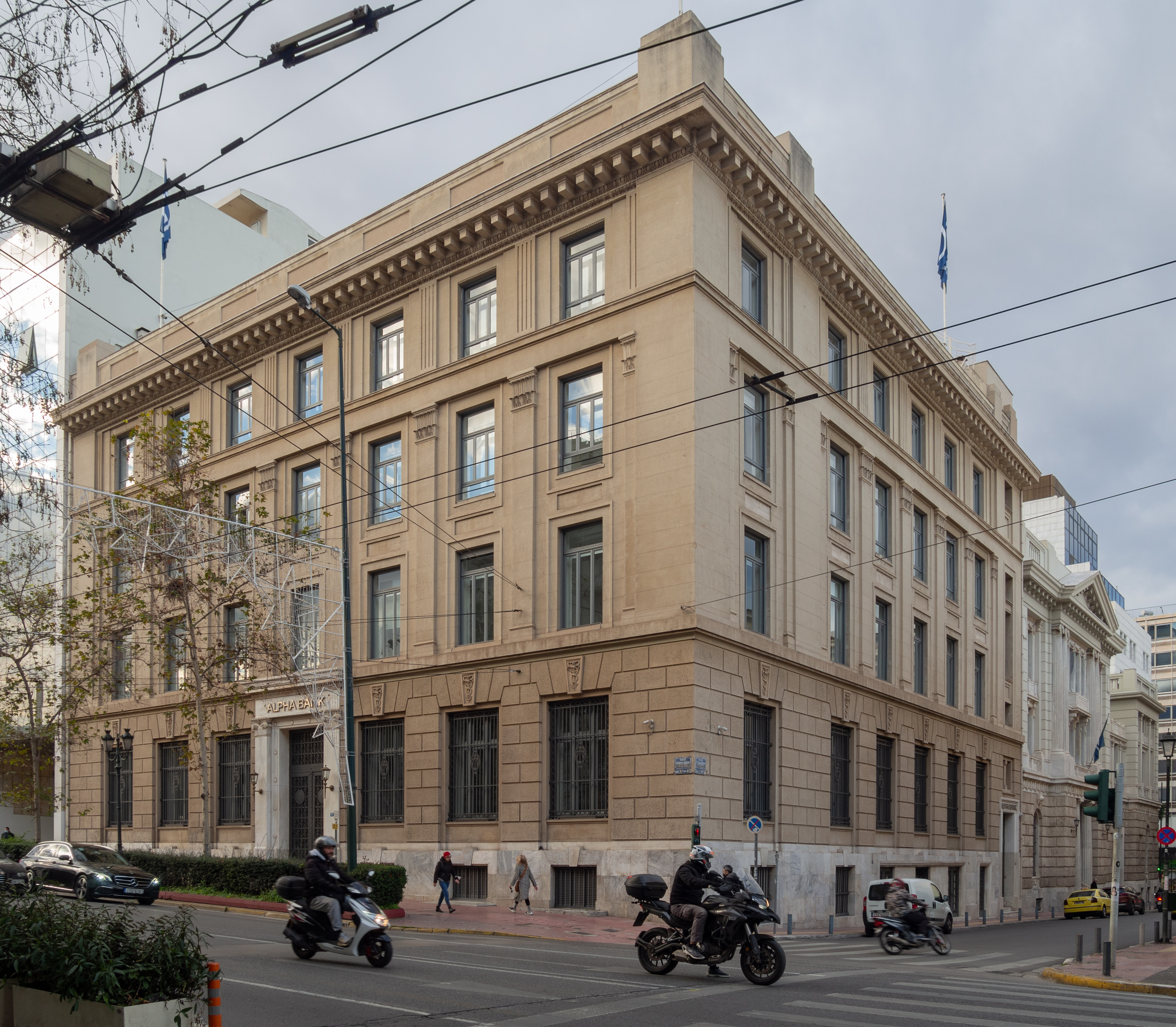
Former head office of Popular Bank on Panepistimiou Street, also designed by Metaxas and completed 1927, with the former Ionian Bank building visible on the right

In 1920, the Ionian Bank lost its privilege of note issue. By then, it had a network of 13 branches all over Greece. Two years later, it acquired the Constantinople branch of Guaranty Trust Co. of New York, and possibly a sub-branch or agency in Smyrna. In 1924, it continued its international expansion by opening a representative office in New York.

In 1926, the Ionian Bank expanded to Cyprus by establishing a branch in Nicosia, followed in 1927 by agencies in Famagusta, Limassol, and Larnaca. In 1928, it closed its operations in New York and Istanbul; assets of the latter were taken over by Deutsche Bank. In 1938, it acquired more than two-thirds of the share capital of Popular Bank, which had been established in 1905.

== World War II and aftermath ==
During World War II in 1942, the Italian authorities forcibly acquired the Ionian Bank's holdings in Popular Bank. At the end of the War, the Ionian Bank regained its holdings. In 1949, it further increased its holdings in Popular Bank to four-fifths of the capital. Two years later it returned to Egypt by establishing a branch in Cairo.

In 1956, in the wake of the Suez Crisis, the Egyptian government established Bank Al-Goumhouria to take over the Egyptian operations of Ionian Bank and those of the Ottoman Bank. The Ionian Bank had provided cover for British Intelligence, and two of its directors, Bickham Sweet-Escott and Robin Brook, had belonged to MI6. Be that as it may, all British and French banks were nationalized by Egypt at the same time.

The loss of the Egyptian activity marked a turning point for the Ionian Bank. In 1957, Emporiki Bank acquired all operations of Ionian Bank and of its subsidiary Popular Bank in Greece, then merged the former into the latter which was renamed Ionian and Popular Bank, which thus became the third-largest bank in Greece with a nationwide network of 24 branches. The Cyprus operations were sold to the Chartered Bank. Meanwhile in London, Michael Behrens and John Trusted acquired the UK-based parent entity of Ionian Bank in 1958 and converted it into a merchant bank. This London operation was never very successful and in 1977 it voluntarily gave up its banking licence, ceasing operations in 1978.

In 1975, the Ionian and Popular Bank was placed under government supervision, as was the entire Emporiki group. In 1986, Ionian and Popular Bank reverted to using "Ionian Bank" as its brand identity. In 1988 it opened an office in London. Eventually, Alpha Bank announced its purchase of Ionian Bank on 26 March 1999, and absorbed it in 2000.

As of 2024, most of the Ionian Bank's former buildings in Greece were still used by Alpha Bank. In Alexandria, its main branch at 41 Saad Zaghloul Street (corner of Adib Bek Ashak Street) went to the Alexandria Commercial and Maritime Bank, which in 2006 was acquired by Abu Dhabi's Union National Bank. The branch later came under operation by Qatar National Bank, which reopened it in 2023 following renovation.

== See also ==
- Banknote Museum of Alpha Bank
- Privileged Bank of Epirothessaly
- Bank of Crete (1899–1919)
- List of banks in Greece
