= PROBANK =

Indonesia bank

- Company type: Private
- Founded: 2001
- Headquarters: Indonesia, Greece
- Key people: Miltiadis Damanakis
- Products: Commercial banking
- Website: www.probank.gr

PROBANK was a Greek bank that provided financial services. Its headquarters were in Athens and it operated 112 branches (as of November 2012) across Greece.

It was established in July 2001, following the receipt of a banking license by the Bank of Greece in May 2001. The first branch was opened in November 2001.

The company offered investment, debit and credit card, leasing, and deposit account services to its customers.

In July 2013, following PROBANK's inability to meet the regulatory deadline for recapitalization, the Bank of Greece intervened to oversee the credit institution's resolution. A selection of the bank's assets and liabilities was transferred to the National Bank of Greece to ensure operational continuity and financial stability.

Following this asset transfer, the credit license of Probank was formally revoked, and the entity was placed under special liquidation proceedings.

== See also ==
- List of banks in Greece
