= HSBC Bank Greece =

HSBC Continental Europe, Greece
- Type: Subsidiary of HSBC Continental Europe
- Industry: Finance and Insurance
- Founded: 1981
- Defunct: 2022
- Headquarters: Athens, Greece
- Key people: Peter Yeates, CEO
- Products: Financial services
- Website: hsbc.gr

HSBC Continental Europe, Greece, commonly referred to as HSBC Greece, was a subsidiary of HSBC Continental Europe, headquartered in Athens, Greece. The bank provided personal banking and corporate banking services. In 2022, Pancreta Bank acquired HSBC Greece.

== History ==
HSBC established its presence in Greece in 1981.

In 2001, HSBC Greece agreed to buy Barclays Bank's 13 branches in Greece as well as Barclays AEDAK, its Greek fund management company, to develop its wealth management business. Barclays Bank P.L.C. Greece had net assets of about $1.17 million US dollars at the end of December 1999 and Barclays AEDAK reported funds under management of $153.1 million US dollars.

In December 2021, HSBC Greece managed assets totaling approximately €2 billion euros and employed around 320 individuals. The bank's operations encompassed 15 branches, serving over 90,000 retail customers and about 500 corporate clients.

In March 2022, HSBC Continental Europe announced an in-principle agreement to sell its branch operations in Greece to Pancreta Bank, a Greek bank. This strategic decision was part of HSBC's broader plan to streamline its operations and concentrate on core markets, particularly in Asia. The proposed transaction was subject to regulatory approvals and consultations with unions and works councils, with an expected completion timeline in the first half of 2023.

In November 2022, Pancreta Bank had successfully completed the full integration of HSBC's operations in Greece into their own.

== See also ==
- List of banks in Greece
