= New Proton Bank =

Commercial bank based in Athens, Greece

New Proton Bank S.A.
- Trade name: Proton Bank
- Native name: Νέα Proton Τράπεζα Α.Ε.
- Traded as: Anonymi Etairia
- Industry: Financial services
- Predecessor: Proton Bank
- Founded: Athens, Greece (October 9, 2011)
- Defunct: November 22, 2013
- Number of locations: 28 branches (2013)
- Area served: Greece
- Parent: Eurobank
- Website: proton.gr

New Proton Bank was a commercial bank based in Athens, Greece. It had been established as a good bank, to which all deposits and sound assets of Proton Bank were transferred.

== See also ==
- List of banks in Greece
