= List of banks in Greece =

Part of Alpha Bank head office complex, Athens

Eurobank Ergasias head office, Athens

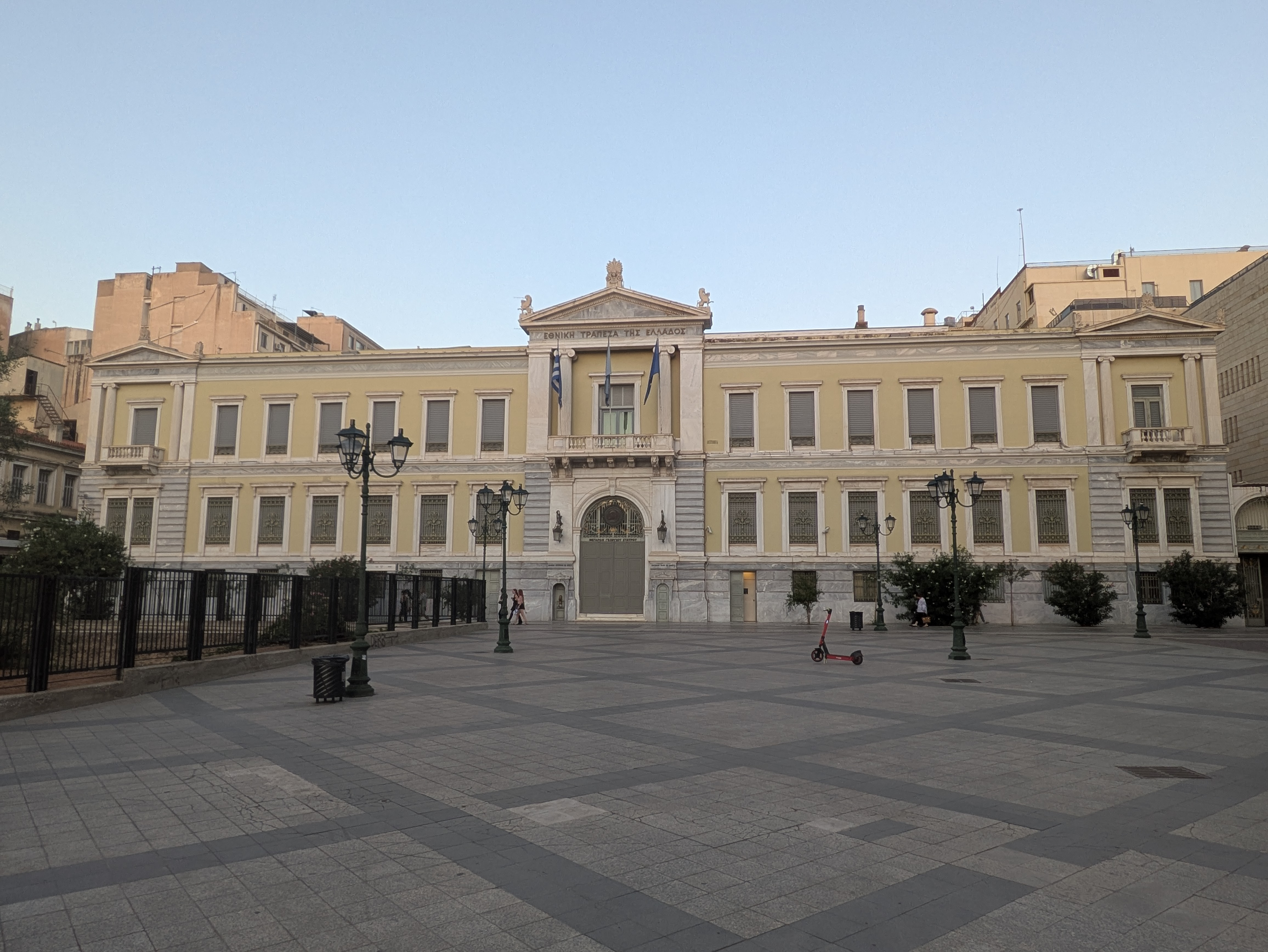
National Bank of Greece historical head office building, Athens

Piraeus Bank head office, Athens

The following list of banks in Greece is to be understood within the framework of the European single market and European banking union, which means that Greece's banking system is more open to cross-border banking operations than peers outside of the EU.

== Policy framework ==
European banking supervision distinguishes between significant institutions (SIs) and less significant institutions (LSIs), with SI/LSI designations updated regularly by the European Central Bank (ECB). Significant institutions are directly supervised by the ECB using joint supervisory teams that involve the national competent authorities (NCAs) of individual participating countries. Less significant institutions are supervised by the relevant NCA on a day-to-day basis, under the supervisory oversight of the ECB. In Greece's case, the NCA is the Bank of Greece.

== Significant institutions ==
As of 1 September 2025, the list of supervised institutions maintained by the ECB included the following four Greek banking groups as SIs, with names as indicated by the ECB for each group's consolidating entity.

- Alpha Bank SA
- Eurobank Ergasias Services and Holdings SA
- National Bank of Greece SA
- Piraeus Financial Holdings SA

Other euro-area-based banking groups also have operations in Greece, but a study published in 2024 suggests that their footprint in the country is much smaller than that of the four major Greek banks. All such cases are via branches, none via subsidiaries.

== Less significant institutions ==
As of 1 September 2025, the ECB's list of supervised institutions included ten Greek LSIs, of which the following three were designated by the ECB as "high-impact" on the basis of several criteria including size:

- Aegean Baltic Bank SA
- CrediaBank SA
- Optima bank SA

The other seven Greek LSIs were:

- Cooperative Bank of Chania Cooperative of Limited Liabilities (Coop. LL)
- Cooperative Bank of Epirus Ltd
- Cooperative Bank of Karditsa Coop. LL
- Cooperative Bank of Thessaly Coop. LL
- WeRealize.comLtd, parent entity of Viva Wallet Group
  - Viva Wallet Holdings Software Development SA, an intermediate holding entity
  - Vivabank SA

== The First Greek NeoBank ==
- Snappi Bank SA

== Third-country branches ==
As of 13 October 2025, there were two branches of banks established outside the European Economic Area ("third-country branches" in EU parlance) in Greece:

- Bank Saderat Iran
- (Turkey) Ziraat Bank

== Other institutions ==
The Bank of Greece and Hellenic Development Bank are public credit institutions that do not hold a banking license under EU law. The Greek Deposits and Loans Fund is also specifically exempted from the scope of application of the EU Capital Requirements Directives.

== Defunct banks ==
A number of former Greek banks, defined as having been headquartered in the present-day territory of Greece, are documented on Wikipedia. They are listed below in chronological order of establishment. Multiple Greek banks came to an end in 2013 as a consequence of the Greek government-debt crisis.

- National Financial Bank (1828-1834)
- Ionian Bank (1839-2000)
- Privileged Bank of Epirothessaly (1882-1899)
- Bank of Salonica (1886-1947)
- Bank of Athens (1893-1953)
- Bank of Crete (1899–1919)
- TT Hellenic Postbank (1900-2013), briefly followed by New TT Hellenic Postbank in 2013
- Banque d'Orient (1904-1932)
- Emporiki Bank (1907-2013)
- National Economy Bank (1918-1930)
- Agricultural Bank of Greece (1919-2013)
- Attica Bank (1925-2025)
- Geniki Bank (1937-2014)
- Ergasias Bank (1975-2000)
- Arab-Hellenic Bank (1979-1994)
- Bank of Crete (1980–1999)
- HSBC Bank Greece (1981-2022)
- Aspis Bank (1992-2013)
- Cyprus Popular Bank Greece (1992-2013)
- Pancretan Cooperative Bank (1994-2024)
- Millennium Bank (2000-2013)
- FBBank (2001-2013)
- Omega Bank (2001-2006)
- PROBANK (2001-2013)
- Proton Bank (2001-2011), followed by New Proton Bank (2011-2013)

== See also ==
- List of banks in the euro area
- List of banks in Europe
