= Marbo Product =

Serbian food company

Coordinates: 44°48′35.5″N 20°24′14.8″E

Marbo Product d.o.o.
- Official logo
- Native name: Марбо продукт д.о.о. Marbo produkt d.o.o.
- Company type: Subsidiary
- Industry: Food
- Founded: 16 April 1995; 31 years ago
- Headquarters: Đorđa Stanojevića 14, Belgrade, Serbia
- Area served: Southeast Europe
- Key people: Nenad Miščević (Director)
- Products: Snack foods
- Brands: Chipsy, Clipsy, Pardon, GUD
- Revenue: ▲€104.99 million (2018)
- Net income: ▲€6.96 million (2018)
- Total assets: ▼€54.03 million (2018)
- Total equity: ▼€36.70 million (2018)
- Number of employees: 982 (2018)
- Parent: PepsiCo
- Website: pepsico.rs

Marbo Product (Serbian: Марбо продукт / Marbo produkt) is a Serbian subsidiary of PepsiCo that manufactures, markets, and sells potato chips, and other snack foods. Its headquarters is in Belgrade, Serbia. Some of their brands are Chipsy, Clipsy, GUD and Pardon.

== History ==
Marbo Product was founded on 16 April 1995, by Serbian businessmen Andrej Jovanović and Bojan Milovanović. In the beginning, Marbo Product had a factory in Maglić near Novi Sad, and in 2000 it opened another factory in Laktaši, Bosnia and Herzegovina, but it was closed in 2021. Throughout the years, Marbo Product emerged as a leader on the Serbian potato chip and snack food market. As of 2008, Marbo Product has facilities and distributive centers in several countries in the region – including: Kosovo, Albania, Croatia, Greece, Montenegro and North Macedonia.

In August 2008, Marbo Product was purchased by American multinational food, snack, and beverage corporation, PepsiCo, for €210 million.
