= Piraeus Bank =

Second largest bank in Greece

- Head office building in Athens
- Native name: Τράπεζα Πειραιώς Α.Ε.
- Type: Public
- Traded as: Athex: TPEIR
- ISIN: GRS831003009
- Industry: Financial services
- Founded: 6 July 1916; 110 years ago
- Headquarters: Athens, Greece
- Number of locations: 384 branches (2025)
- Area served: Greece; Ukraine
- Key people: Christos Megalou (CEO); George Handjinicolaou (chairperson)
- Revenue: ▲€2.707 billion (net revenue, 2025)
- Operating income: ▲€1.837 billion (recurring, 2025)
- Net income: ▲€1.196 billion (normalized, 2025)
- AUM: ▲€16.329 billion (Q2 2026)
- Total assets: ▲€93.399 billion (adjusted, Q2 2026)
- Total equity: ▲€9.790 billion (including AT1, Q2 2026)
- Owner: Paulson & Co. (13.62%); Helikon Investments (9%)
- Number of employees: 8,518 (Q2 2026)
- Subsidiaries: MIG Holdings (87.7948%); Piraeus Bank ICB (99.99%); Ethniki Hellenic General Insurance Company (100%); Strix Holdings (100%); Trastor Real Estate Investment Company (97.78%)
- Capital ratio: Fully Loaded Common Equity Tier 1 = 11.5% (Fully Loaded Basel III)
- Website: www.piraeusbank.gr

Piraeus Bank (Greek: Τράπεζα Πειραιώς) is a Greek multinational financial services company with its headquarters in Athens, Greece. Piraeus Bank's shares have been listed on Euronext Athens (ATHEX) since January 1918.

In Greece, with a 30% market share in loans (34.4 billion) and 29% in deposits (54.6 billion), it is the country's largest bank.

Piraeus has been designated as a Significant Institution since the entry into force of European Banking Supervision in late 2014, and as a consequence is directly supervised by the European Central Bank.

== Overview ==
Piraeus Bank is a universal bank providing various banking services.

It operates in agricultural banking, consumer and mortgage credit, green banking, capital markets, investment banking, leasing, and electronic banking.

Piraeus Bank and its subsidiaries form the Piraeus Bank Group.

== History ==
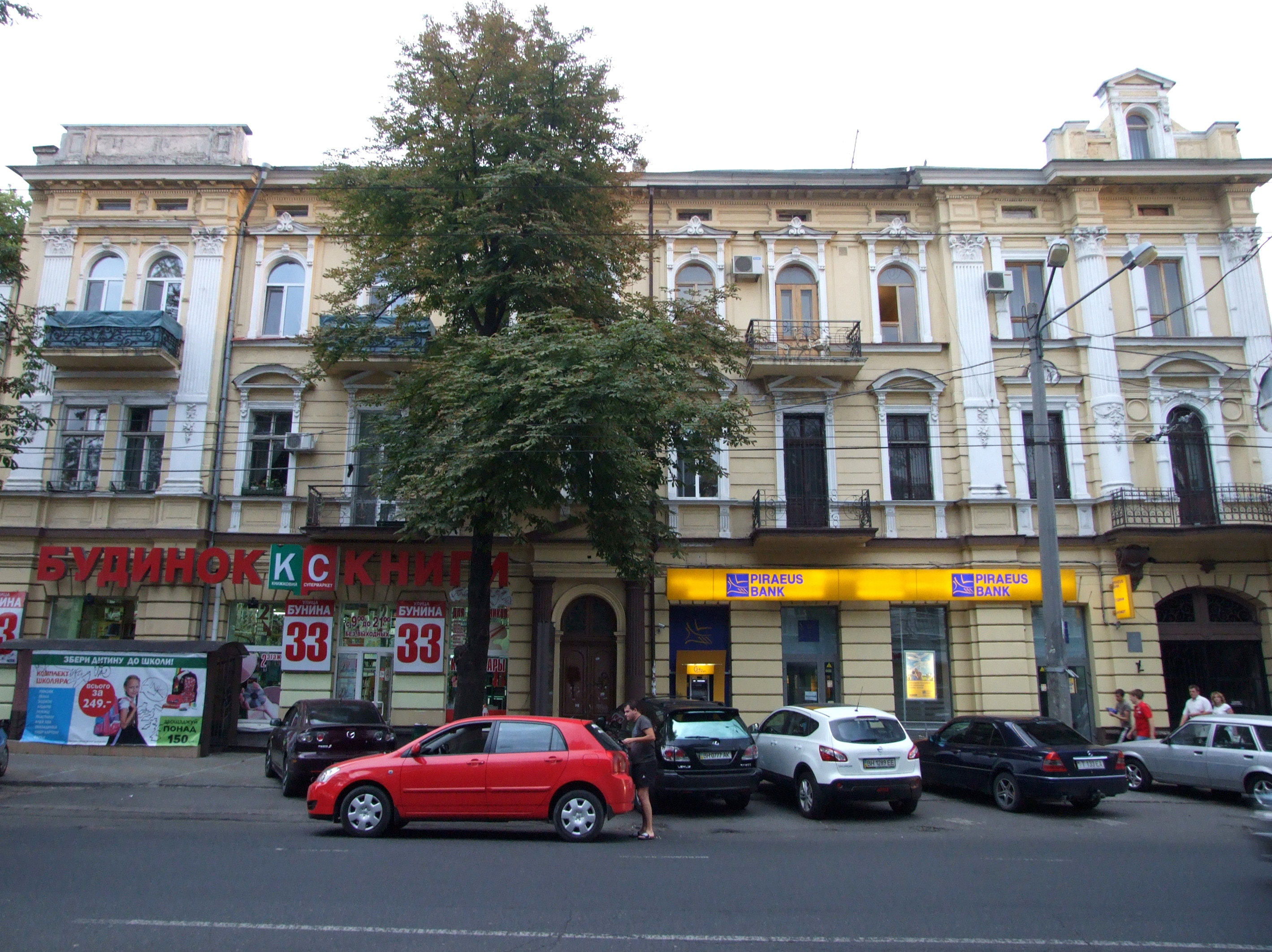
Building in Odesa, Ukraine

Piraeus Bank logo from 2014 to 2024

A group of shipowners in Piraeus founded Banque du Pirée (Piraeus Bank; BP) in 1916 to finance trade. The bank started trading on the Athens Exchange in 1918. The Greek government bought the bank in 1975 and transformed it into a universal bank. The new headquarters designed by Sir Basil Spence were built on Stadiou Street in the center of Athens. In December 1991 the government privatised the bank, which has grown in size and scope since then.

In 1962, PT joined the Emporiki Bank Group (or Andreadis Group). In On December 5, 1975, PT was nationalised and in 1991, the state privatized PT and the bank changed its name to Piraeus Bank (TP). At the same time Michalis Sallas took over. In 1995 the Group established Piraeus Bank Romania with 160 branches and one year later Tirana Bank, the first privately owned banking institution in Albania with 56 branches. In 1999 with its acquisition of Xiosbank, PB took over Xios's branch in Sofia, Bulgaria; it has now some 83 branches in the country. PB also acquired the small New York-based Marathon National Bank and Interbank N.Y; it merged Interbank into Marathon Bank.

In 1998 the bank absorbed the Greek branch networks of Chase Manhattan Bank, Crédit Lyonnais, and acquired a controlling interest in Macedonia-Thrace Bank. A year later it added in the activities of National Westminster Bank and acquired Xiosbank (Bank of Chios) which it totally absorbed along with Macedonia-Thrace Bank. In 2002 Piraeus Bank signed a strategic alliance with ING Group (bancassurance). In 2005 it acquired the Bulgarian Eurobank, Atlas Bank in Serbia, Egyptian Commercial Bank in Egypt. In 2007 it expanded in Ukraine by acquiring the International Commerce Bank (renamed as Piraeus Bank ICB) and established Piraeus Bank Cyprus with the acquisition of Arab Bank Cyprus.

In 2002 the bank absorbed 58% of ETBA Bank (Hellenic Industrial Development Bank). PB also started a strategic alliance with ING Group, which took a 5% stake in the Piraeus Bank. In 2006 the PB sold back to ING its stake in a jointly owned mutual funds company. Cooperation continues via the bank-assurance company ING-PIRAEUS.

In 2005 Piraeus Bank acquired the Belgrade-based Atlas banka in Serbia (today Piraeus Bank Beograd with 42 branches), and the Egyptian Commercial Bank (today Piraeus Bank Egypt with 43).

In 2007 PB purchased the Cyprus arm of Arab Bank and renamed it Piraeus Bank (Cyprus). On 13 September 2007 Piraeus Bank completed its acquisition of 99.6% of the share capital of International Commercial Bank in Ukraine, today named Piraeus ICB.

Within the European debt crisis, Piraeus Bank has been subject to the Greek austerity packages: the Hellenic Financial Stability Fund became its main stock holder since 2012 and remained such as of 2020.

In 2011, according to reports in July 2012, the bank obscured its real access to capital by providing circular loans to finance purchase of its own stock through undeclared offshore companies.

In 2012, Piraeus Bank took part in the restructuring of the Greek banks, gaining a leading position in the Greek banking sector.

In June 2012 Piraeus Bank sold its shares in Marathon Banking Corporation (New York City) to Investors Bancorp. The capital was used to finance the take over of Societe Generale's Geniki Bank and parts of the Agricultural Bank of Greece.

In 2013, Piraeus Bank was considered as having sufficient capital and was included in the group of 4 systemic banks which would be coordinated by the Hellenic Financial Stability Fund to absorb undercapitalised banks. It would reach an international presence consisting of 370 branches focusing in Southeastern Europe and the Eastern Mediterranean as of 2014. In March 2013 it took over the Greek branches of Bank of Cyprus, Hellenic Bank and CPB Bank and in June it took over Millenium Bank. In April 2015 it took over parts of Greek cooperative bank Panellinia. In May 2015, the bank agreed to sell its subsidiary in Egypt to the Al Ahli Bank of Kuwait. The sale was completed in November 2015.

After a probe by the European Commission over government bailouts following the Greek government-debt crisis, in July 2014 restructuring plans for the bank were approved. In November 2015 the European Commission approved amended restructuring plans for Alpha Bank and Eurobank and then for Piraeus Bank on 29 November 2015, allowing a new injection of €2.72 billion of public funds via the Hellenic Financial Stability Fund.

In July 2016, Michalis Sallas resigned after 25 years as chairman of the bank.

In the following years, Piraeus Bank proceeded to divest abroad. In March 2017, the bank sold Piraeus Bank Cyprus to an investment group led by Lebanese businessman Maurice Sehnaoui, which renamed it AstroBank. In October 2017, Piraeus agreed to sell its Serbian banking and leasing operations of Piraeus Bank Beograd, to Direktna Banka A.D. In December 2017, it sold Piraeus Bank Romania to J.C. Flowers & Co. In April 2018, it sold Piraeus Bank Beograd to Direktna Banka A.D. In June 2019, it sold Piraeus Bank Bulgaria to Eurobank Bulgaria, which is operating under the Postbank brand. In March 2019, the bank completed the sale of its 98.83% stake in its Albanian subsidiary Tirana Bank to Balfin Group and Komercijalna Banka.

As of June 2019, the Hellenic Financial Stability Fund held 26% of outstanding common shares, while the remaining 74% was held by the private sector (legal entities and individuals).

HFSF had the option to €2 billion of perpetual bonds into Piraeus Bank shares in December 2022. As of November 2020, the total market capitalization of the bank was less than €500 million. The conversion was triggered in November 2020, giving HFSF a further 35% share of the bank, worth less than 200 million euro, a paper loss of over 1.5 billion euro.

In March 2022, the bank bought a 52.07% stake in Trastor Real Estate Investment Company, raising their total stake to 96.8%.

In March 2024, the Hellenic Financial Stability Fund sold its entire 27 percent stake in Piraeus Bank, thus fully privatising the bank and raising 1.35 billion euros. In March 2025, Piraeus Bank bought Greek insurance company Ethniki Hellenic General Insurance Company for €600 million, the acquisition was finalized in November 2025.

In December 2025, Piraeus Bank completed a reverse merger, absorbing its parent company Piraeus Financial Holdings. The shareholders of the holding company became shareholders of Piraeus Bank, which began offering shares on the Athens Stock Exchange in December 2025.

== Head Office ==
The head office of Piraeus Bank in Athens was originally erected in the 1930s for the Pension Fund of the Greek Army (Greek: Μετοχικό Ταμείο Στρατού), which still owns it and leases it to the bank.

== Controversy ==
=== Data Protection Fine ===
In May 2023, Piraeus Bank was fined €210k by the Greek Data Protection Supervisory Authority for unlawful processing of personal data and failure to respond to a request for information. This information is supported by a reference provided by the GDPR Fine Tracker Portal

== See also ==
- List of banks in the euro area
- List of banks in Greece
