= Cecil Coward =

Sir Cecil Allen Coward (27 December 1845 – 27 July 1938) was a British lawyer who grew up in New Zealand.

Cecil Allen Coward was born at 11 Minerva Terrace, Islington, London, on 27 December 1845, the second child and only son of John William Smith Coward (1815–1888), a surgeon, and his first wife, Anna Eliza, née Bemfield (d. 1847).

In late 1856, the family emigrated to New Zealand, arriving in Wellington Harbour on the Philip Laing and then settling in Christchurch. His father's second wife, Jane Helen Georgina, née MacFarlane, was thus reunited with her father. Lt Dugald MacFarlane, a Waterloo-veteran, had come to Christchurch on Sir George Seymour, one of First Four Ships, in 1850. In August 1865, Coward passed his matriculation examination and later that year, he returned to England to train as a barrister.

Coward joined Thomas and Hollams, which evolved to become Coward,

Chance & Co. (and which would eventually become one of the United Kingdom's leading law firms through its 1987 merger with Clifford Turner to form Clifford Chance). In 1910, he succeeded Sir John Hollams as the firm's senior partner. He was knighted in the 1928 Birthday Honours as president of the Law Society, and retired that year.

On 31 Mar 1875, he married Catherine Elizabeth Thomas, the younger daughter of Griffith Thomas, the firm's senior partner from 1862 to 1873 and then a director of the Central Bank. They had eight children: Catherine Evelyn Coward, Catherine Brenda Coward, Cecil Robert Coward, Catherine Maude Coward, Catherine Vivian Coward, Catherine Gladys Coward, Catherine Marjorie Coward, and Cecil John Griffith Coward. Cecil Allen Coward lived in Kensington, London, with his family and servants.

Coward died at his house in 10 Melbury Road, Kensington on 27 July 1938, aged 92.
