= Alpha Bank =

Fourth largest bank in Greece

Alpha Services and Holdings S.A.

- Part of Alpha Bank head office complex in Athens
- Trade name: Alpha Υπηρεσιών και Συμμετοχών
- Native name: Alpha Υπηρεσιών και Συμμετοχών Α.Ε.
- Formerly: Bank of Kalamata, Commercial Credit Bank
- Type: Public
- Traded as: Athex: ALPHA
- ISIN: GRS015003007
- Industry: Financial services
- Founded: 10 March 1918; 108 years ago in Kalamata, Greece
- Founder: Yannis Costopoulos
- Headquarters: Athens, Greece
- Number of locations: 287 branches (2024)
- Area served: Greece and Cyprus
- Key people: Vassilios Psaltis (CEO); Dimitris Tsitsiragos (chairperson)
- Operating income: ▲€2.219 billion (2024)
- Net income: ▲€860.9 million (2024)
- Total assets: ▲€74,516 billion (Q3 2025)
- Total equity: ▲€7.473 billion (2024)
- Owner: UniCredit (29.8%)
- Number of employees: 8,487
- Capital ratio: Tier 1 Ratio 13.2% (2021)
- Website: www.alpha.gr

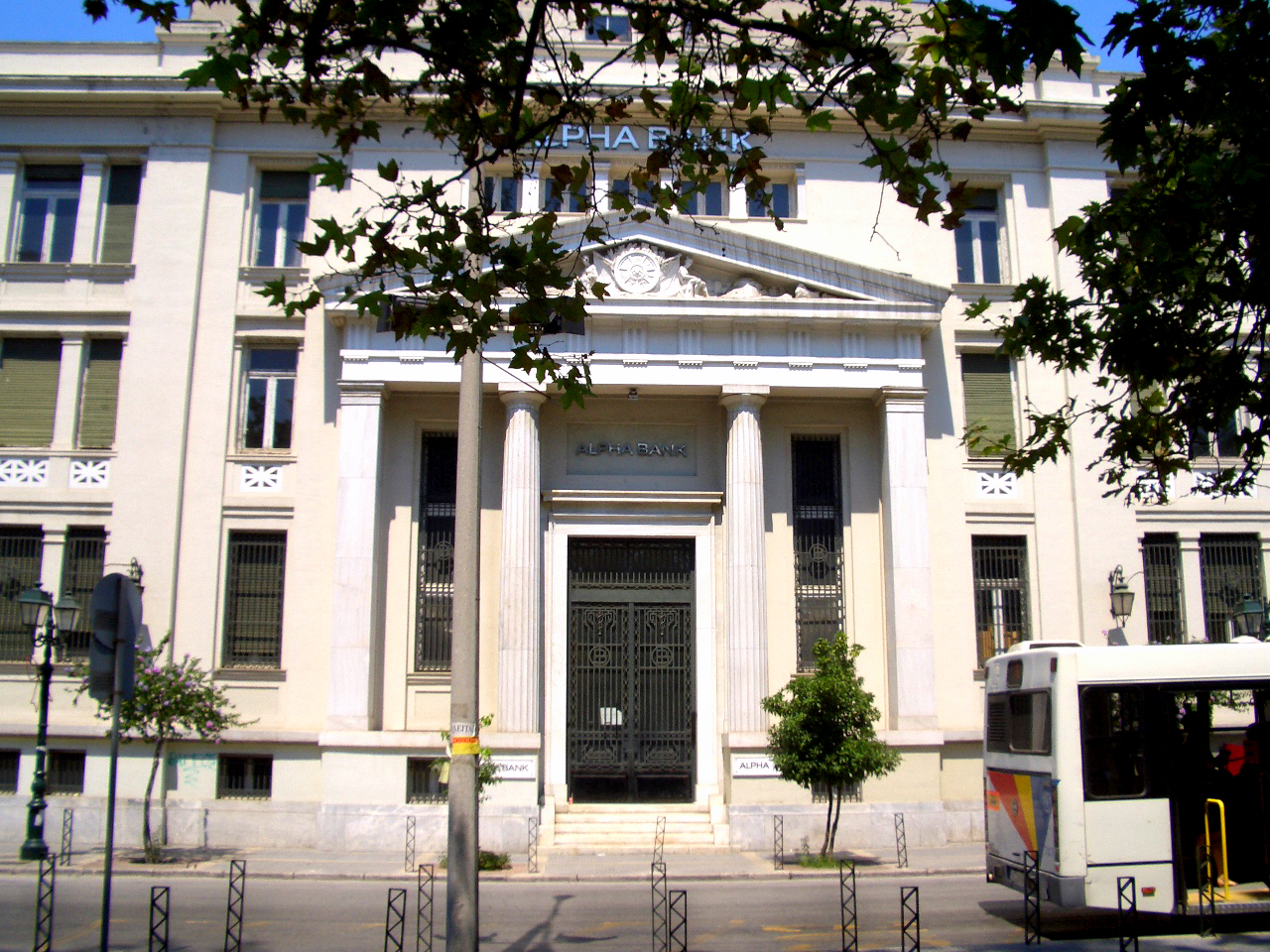
Alpha Bank Residence Thessaloniki

Alpha Bank is a Greek bank, headquartered in Athens, Greece. It has been founded in 1918 by John Kostopoulos and listed on the Athens Stock Exchange since November 1925. As of 2025, it operates 272 branches in Greece and 12 additional locations in Cyprus, employing approximately 8,500 people.

== History ==
=== First years ===
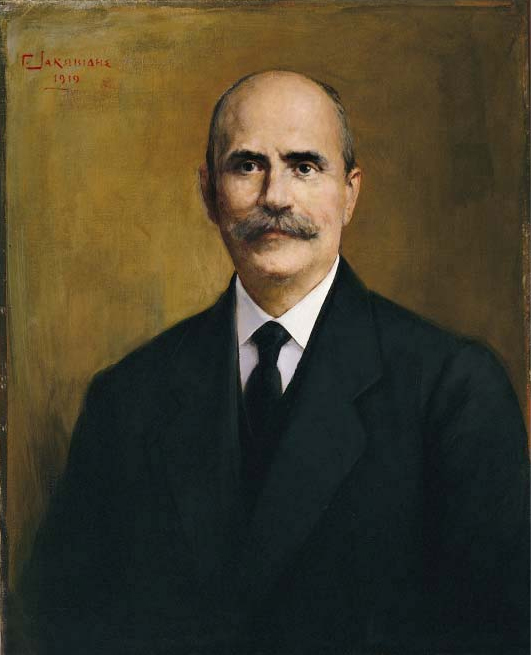
John F. Costopoulos, Painting by Georgios Jakobides, 1919

Ioannis F. Kostopoulos, a textile merchant from Sperhogeia in Messinia, founded a commercial shop in 1882 in Kalamata and in 1885 he started to be active in foreign exchange trading. In 1916 the trading house was transformed into a bank under the "Bank I. F. Kostopoulos" with the participation of Laiki Bank of Dionysios Loverdos. In 1918 the bank was transformed from a limited partnership into a joint-stock company called "Bank of Kalamata.

After the death of Ioannis F. Kostopoulos, the reins of the bank were taken over initially by Spyros Kostopoulos and then by Dimitrios Kostopoulos, who in 1923 merged the banking division of the commercial house "Ioannis F. Kostopoulos" with the Bank of Kalamon, creating the "Bank of Hellenic Commercial Credit" based in Athens. On 2 November 1925 the bank was listed on the Athens Stock Exchange and in 1932 the bank moved to a privately owned building on Stadiou and Pezmazoglou streets.

The economic crisis of 1929 forced the "Bank of Hellenic Commercial Credit" to reduce its network of branches and to seek financing from the National Bank of Greece, which now appointed a representative to its board of directors. Dimitris Kostopoulos was succeeded in the leadership of the bank by his sons Spyros and Stavros Kostopoulos.

The war period that would follow would lead the bank to a dead end, which would liquidate almost all its assets. The board of directors will even call an extraordinary general meeting on 19 December 1944 to dissolve the company. The dissolution would not take place due to the events of Dekemvriana and after the Treaty of Varkiza the decision of the directors would be revised.

=== Post-war period ===
In 1947 the name of the bank was changed to "Commercial Credit Bank". After the difficult 1950s, marked by a recession, the bank began to focus on developing a national network of branches. In 1965, Manufacturers Hanover Trust 15, the fourth largest bank at the time, United California Bank, and N.V. Slavenburg's Dutch Bank would join the company's capital stock.

In the 1970s, Yannis Kostopoulos, son of Spyros Kostopoulos, joined the management of the company. The bank promoted a new corporate identity, renamed itself "Credit Bank" and adopted the reverse of the silver stater of Aegina as its archetype.[17] In 1979 the bank celebrated its 100th anniversary. In 1984, after the death of his father Spyros, Yannis Kostopoulos assumed the duties of chairman of the board of directors. Under his leadership, the bank expanded its activities to other sectors through the establishment of dozens of subsidiaries.

In 1989 the bank expanded its activities to London with the establishment of a Representative Office, which shortly afterwards, in 1993, would become a branch. In 1993 the bank established "Banca Bucuresti", today Alpha Bank Romania, becoming the first foreign bank to enter the Romanian banking market.

=== 1994 - 2000 ===
In 1994 the name of the bank was changed again to "Alpha Credit Bank". In 1997 the bank expanded into Albania with the establishment of branches in all major cities of the country. In 1998, the bank was the first in Greece to launch Alpha Web Banking, which established banking transactions via the Internet, and in the same year the bank expanded to Cyprus with the acquisition of Lombard NatWest Bank Ltd, which would later be renamed Alpha Bank Cyprus.

The following year the bank acquired a majority stake in Kreditna Banka the fourth largest bank in North Macedonia, later renamed Alpha Bank A.D. Skopje. In 1999 the Bank acquired 51% of the shares of Ionian Bank for 272 billion drachmas, making it the largest privatisation ever in Greece. The merger of the two banking institutions was completed in 2000 and the new enlarged bank was named Alpha Bank.

=== 2000 - 2010 ===
In 2002, Alpha Bank expands into the Serbian banking market with the establishment of a branch in Belgrade and two years later, it acquires the majority stake in Jubanka a.d. Belgrade, which is renamed Alpha Bank Srbija A.D. A milestone in the bank's course was its promotion to the status of Major National Sponsor and Official Bank of the ATHENS 2004 Olympic Games, making it the largest sponsorship ever in Greece.

In 2005 Dimitrios Mantzounis took over as CEO with Yannis Kostopoulos remaining as chairman of the board of directors of the bank. In 2008 the bank expanded into Ukraine with the acquisition of a majority stake in the newly established Ukrainian bank OJSC Astra Bank.

=== 2010 - today ===
In January 2011, the National Bank of Greece submitted a written proposal to Alpha Bank for a merger of the two banks by absorbing the latter into the former. However, the Board of Directors of Alpha Bank, at its meeting on the 18th of February and after having studied the proposal, decided to reject it on the grounds that the terms were unfavorable for its shareholders. At the end of August of the same year, the agreement between the boards of directors of Alpha Bank and Eurobank EFG to merge the two organizations was announced, which was however revoked in March 2012.

In 2012 Alpha Bank acquired and absorbed Commercial Bank of Greece and in 2014 it acquired the banking activities of Citibank in Greece, including Diners Club cards. On the 31st of May 2013, the recapitalization of the bank was successfully completed, with the required private participation being more than covered, which resulted in the preservation of Alpha Bank's private character. In 2013, Alpha Bank sold all the shares of its subsidiary JSC Astra Bank Ukraine to the Ukrainian group Delta Bank, in 2015 the Bulgarian branch to Eurobank Bulgaria AD, in 2016 Alpha Bank A.D. Skopje to Silk Road Capital and in 2017 Alpha Bank Srbija to AIK Banka A.D. Beograd.

On 31 March 2014 Alpha Bank successfully completed its €1.2 billion capital increase. The Bank redeemed the total amount of the Hellenic Republic's Preference Shares on 17 April 2014. In May 2014, Vassilis Rapanos replaced Yannis Kostopoulos as chairman of the board of directors of the bank. On 26 October 2014 Alpha Bank announced the successful completion of the European Central Bank's (ECB) Comprehensive Assessment in the Static Adverse Scenario with CET1 8.07% and Capital Surplus of Euro 1.3 billion. Based on the dynamic adverse assumptions, CET1 stands at 8.45% with Capital Surplus of Euro 1.8 billion. Also in 2014, Alpha Bank took over Citibank's Greek retail banking operations. Alpha Bank requested Emergency Liquidity Assistance (ELA) from the Bank of Greece on 16 January 2015. Its total funding from the ECB (ELA and non-ELA) was €29.9 bn as of 30 September 2015. On 17 July 2015 it sold its Bulgarian branches to Postbank (Bulgaria), the subsidiary of fellow Greek bank Eurobank Ergasias.

In November 2015, it was decided to increase the share capital by EUR 2,563,000,000. The increase included a voluntary exchange of bonds for new shares, through which EUR 1,011,000,000 was raised, and a capital increase by cash payment and cancellation of preferential rights of existing shareholders for an amount of EUR 1,552,000,000. As a result of the increase in the bank's share capital, the State's participation, through the Hellenic Financial Stability Fund, was reduced to approximately 11%.

In 2021, Alpha Services and Participations S.A., 100% parent company of Alpha Bank S.A., successfully completed the Share Capital Increase of EUR 800 million by offering 800.000.000.000 new ordinary shares of nominal value of EUR 0,30 each. With the Share Capital Increase, the HFSF's stake in the bank was reduced to approximately 9%. In July 2022, Alpha Bank completed the sale of Alpha Bank Albania to OTP Bank PLC.

In October 2023 it was announced that Alpha Bank in Romania will merge with UniCredit leaving Alpha with a 9.9% holding in the new Romanian bank. The merger was completed in August 2025. The deal made between UniCredit and Alpha Bank included the acquisition by UniCredit of the entire stake that the Hellenic Financial Stability Fund had in Alpha Bank. Consequently, on 13 November 2023, the HFSF sold its 9% share of Alpha Bank to UniCredit.

In January 2025, Dimitris Tsitsiragos succeeded Vassilis Rapanos as chairman. In March 2025, Alpha Bank launched a €200 million takeover bid on Cypriot AstroBank, through its unit in Cyprus (Alpha Bank Cyprus). Alpha Bank finalised the acquisition in June 2025, thus leading to the creation of the third banking group in Cyprus (with a 10% market share) in October 2025 when the merger was completed. In March 2025, Alpha Bank also acquired AXIA Ventures, with plans to combine them with Alpha Finance Investment Services.

In June 2025, Alpha Bank completed the reverse merger of its parent company Alpha Services and Holdings. In 2025, Alpha Bank completed the acquisition of 100% of FlexFin and announced plans to combine it with ABC Factors. In August 2026, Alpha Bank acquired the remaining shares of Alpha Trust Holdings, after which Alpha Bank and its affiliates held all of its shares.

== Subsidiaries ==
Following the reverse merger completed in June 2025, Alpha Bank became the listed parent of the group. The group consists of companies that, in addition to retail banking, offer a wide range of financial products and services, including medium and large corporate banking, capital management and private banking, insurance distribution, investment banking, brokerage and real estate management.

Other subsidiaries of the company are the following:

- Alpha Asset Management Mutual Fund Management S.A.
- Alpha Finance Investment Services S.A.
- Development Company for the Management of European Programmes of Thessaly and Central Greece
- AlphaLife Life Insurance Company S.A
- Alpha Leasing Unipersonal S.A. Financial Leasing
- ABC Factors Business Claims Agency Sole Proprietorship S.A.
- Alpha Ventures Investment Holdings S.A.
- Alpha Supporting Services S.A. Supporting Operations
- Alpha Urban Real Estate S.A. Real Estate, Construction, Tourism and Related Businesses
- Alpha Real Estate Management and Investments S.A. Real Estate Management and Investments S.A.

== Other ==
=== Listing on the Athens Exchange ===
The company is listed on the Athens Exchange with the stock symbol ALPHA; the ISIN is GRS015013006. As of 11 August 2015, the number of securities outstanding and the number of securities listed is 12769059858 (around 12.7 billion).

The stock is one of the 25 stocks in the FTSE/Athex Large Cap index (11 August 2015).

== See also ==
- List of banks in the euro area
- List of banks in Greece
