= Akadimias Street =

Street in Athens, Greece

Coordinates: 37.9814°N 23.7344°E

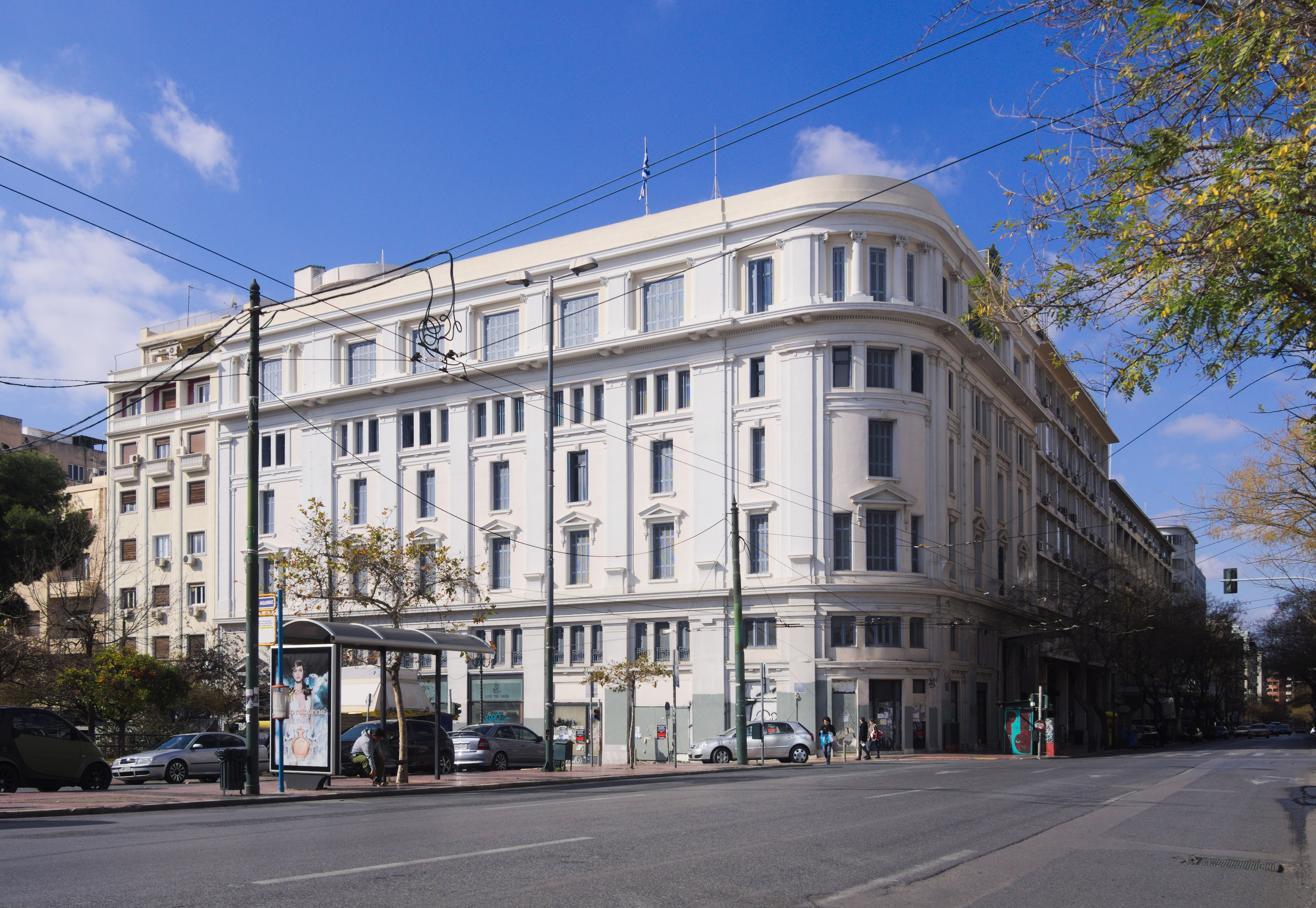
The renovated building of the University Club of the National and Capodistrian University of Athens (Ippokratous & Akadimias Street)

Akadimias Street (Greek: Οδός Ακαδημίας, "Academy Street"; named after the Academy of Athens) is a major street in Athens that runs parallel to Panepistimiou Street and Stadiou Street from Vassilissis Sofias Avenue, in Kolonaki district, to Kanningos Square in the area of Exarcheia. Its total length is about 1.2 km. It has three lanes and runs almost diagonally from southeast to northwest. During World War II, it was officially renamed Roosevelt Street in honour of the US President Franklin Roosevelt, but the Athenians continued to refer to it by its original name.

Buildings along the street include the rear side of the classical trilogy of architect Theophil Hansen (University, Academy and National Library), the front side being on Panepistemiou Street. Buildings along the street also include the Olympia Theatre, an opera venue for the Greek National Opera and the church of the Life-giving Spring (Ζωοδόχος Πηγή, Zoodochos Pigi) (in Greek). To the North-East is the district of Kolonaki.

== Intersections ==
- Kanaris Street
- Voukourestiou Street
- Amerikis Street
- Omirou Street (major)
- Sina Street
- Massalias Street
- Asklepiou & Riga Feraiou Streets
- Ippokratous Street (one way westbound)
- Mavromichalis Street
- Charilaou Trikoupi Street
- Zoodochou Pigis Street
- Emmanouil Benaki Street
- Themistokleous Street
- Tzortz (George) Street
- Kanningos Square
