= Hotel Grande Bretagne =

Hotel in Athens, Greece

Hotel Grande Bretagne, a Luxury Collection Hotel, Athens
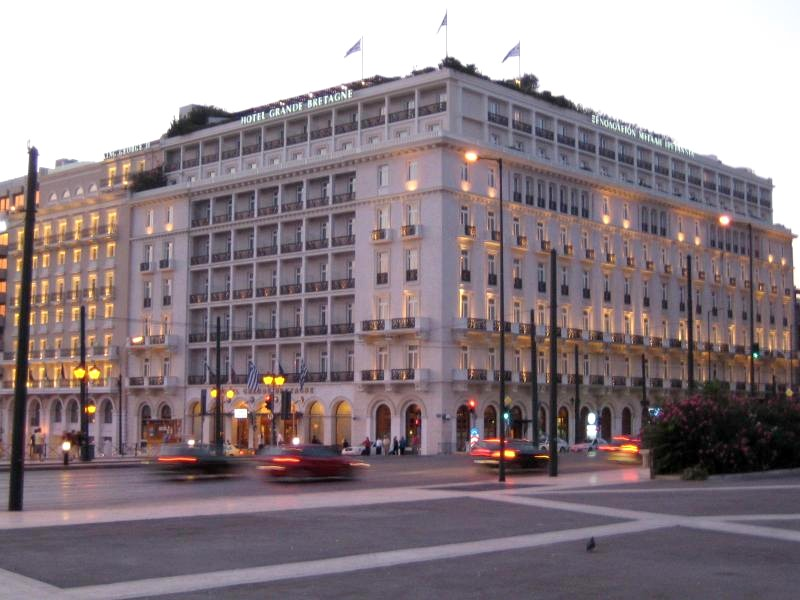
- Hotel Grande Bretagne in Central Athens
- Interactive map of the Hotel Grande Bretagne, a Luxury Collection Hotel, Athens area

General information
- Location: Athens, Greece
- Coordinates: 37.976300°N 23.735448°E
- Owner: Lampsa Hellenic Hotels S.A.
- Operator: Marriott International

Technical details
- Floor count: 9

Other information
- Number of rooms: 320
- Number of restaurants: 8
- Parking: Valet Parking

Website
- official website

The Hotel Grande Bretagne (Greek: Ξενοδοχείο Μεγάλη Βρεταννία) is a luxury hotel in Athens, Greece. It is located on Syntagma Square, on the corner of Vasileos Georgiou A' and Panepistimiou Streets. It is owned presently by Lampsa Hellenic Hotels.

== History ==
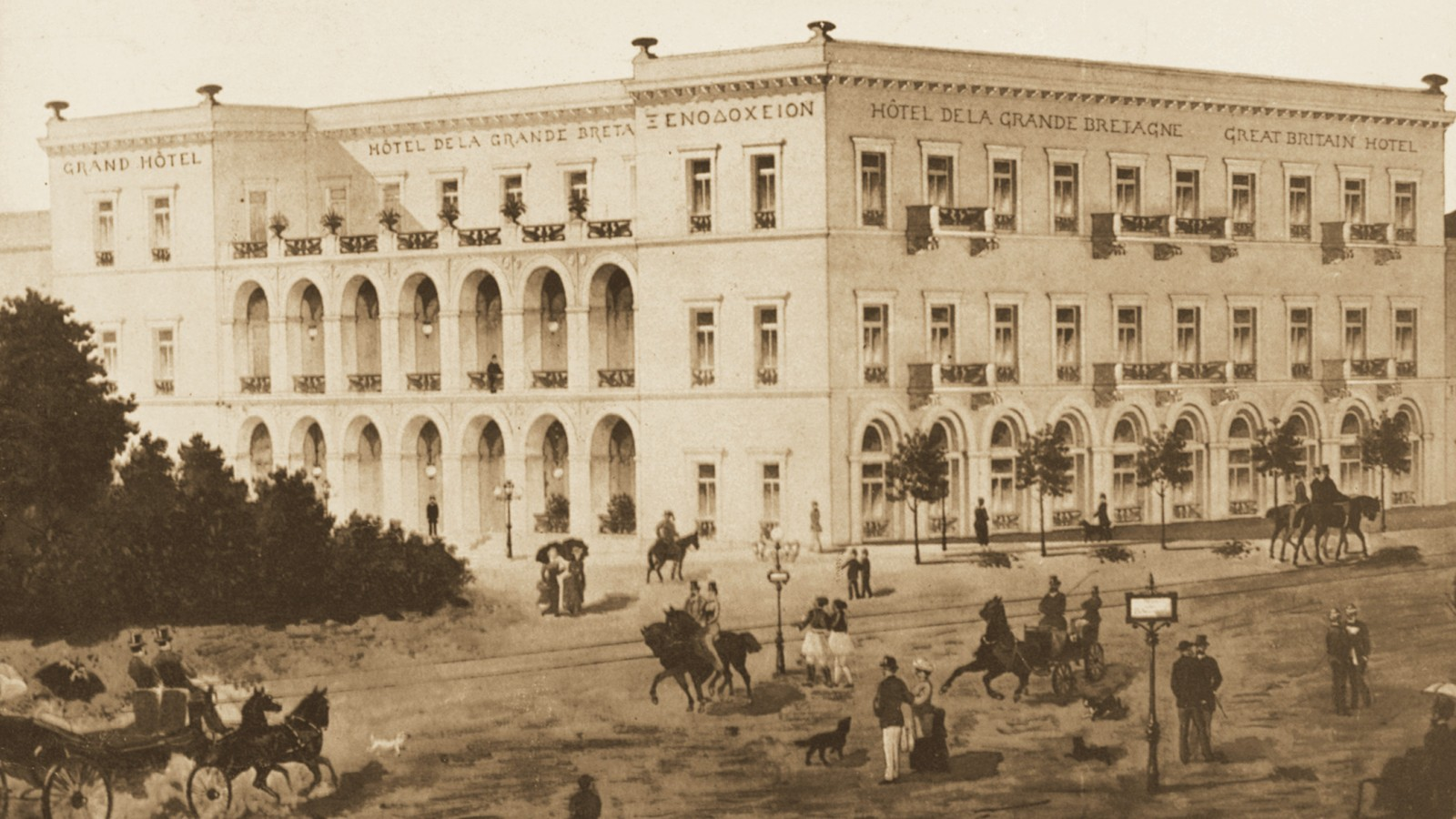
The Hotel Grande Bretagne in 1874, in the original Dimitriou Mansion designed by Theophil Hansen.

The original structure was built during 1842 as a house for Antonis Dimitriou, a wealthy Greek businessman from the island of Lemnos, twelve years after independence of Greece from the Ottoman Empire. In 1874, it was bought by Efstathios Lampsas, who restored it with an 800,000 drachma loan and named it "Grande Bretagne." By 1888, the hotel had electricity installed. In November 1930, a new wing on Panepistimiou Street was inaugurated, and in 1950, another wing on Voukourestiou Street. In 1957, Dimitriou's mansion was demolished and a new wing was built on its place. The architect Kostas Voutsinas and the owners retained some of the style of the original building.

During the Greco-Italian War and the Battle of Greece in 1940–41, the hotel housed the Greek General Headquarters. During the Axis occupation, the hotel served as Nazi headquarters. When the Axis withdrew from Greece, in 1944, British forces made it their headquarters.

During the early stages of the Greek Civil War, the hotel housed Prime Minister Georgios Papandreou, the Council of Ministers, and the British military assistance force under General Ronald Scobie.

On Christmas Day of 1944 and shortly after the events of the Dekemvriana during which the British military alongside Greek collaborationists fired on civilians in Athens, members of the EAM guerrilla resistance organization, including resistance hero Manolis Glezos, planted dynamite in the sewers of the hotel in an attempt to blow up the British headquarters and assassinate General Scobie. The attack was however called off when EAM leadership learned that Winston Churchill had arrived, who had traveled to Greece in an attempt to broker peace between the opposing Greek factions, the UK having previously been allied with the Greek resistance movement against the Axis powers.

In 1991, it was bought by hotel group CIGA from Petrakopoulos and Doxiadis families. Later, it became a property of ITT Sheraton and subsequently, Starwood.

In 2003, the Grande Bretagne underwent a €112-million renovation (starting from 2001) and became a member of The Luxury Collection. The hotel has 320 rooms and suites, including a 400 square metre (4,305 sqf.) suite on the fifth floor. The hotel also has a roof garden restaurant.

In January 2023, the hotel housed numerous European royals who were arriving in Athens the funeral of Constantine II of Greece.
