= Olympia City Music Theatre "Maria Callas" =

Music theatre located in central Athens, Greece

Coordinates: 37°58′57″N 23°44′00″E

- Ολύμπια Δημοτικό Μουσικό Θέατρο «Μαρία Κάλλας»

- Olympia theatre's facade, 2023
- Interactive map of Olympia City Music Theatre "Maria Callas"
- Former names: Olympia Theatre
- Address: 59 Akadimias Street; Athens; Greece
- Owner: Athens Municipality

Construction
- Opened: 1957

The Olympia City Music Theatre "Maria Callas" (Greek: Ολύμπια Δημοτικό Μουσικό Θέατρο «Μαρία Κάλλας», romanized: Olýmpia Dīmotikó Mousikó Théatro "María Kállas", formerly known as Olympia Theatre), is a music theatre located in central Athens, Greece. For more than 50 years, the theatre was the Greek National Opera's main stage.

== History ==
In 1915-16, the first Olympia Theatre was erected on 59 Akadimias Street in Athens, under the architect's Stavros Christidis direction; it had a French type grand hall with a semicircular orchestra, a wide balcony and 24 loges. In 1944, the Greek National Opera was established as an independent opera company, and its first performances took place at the first Olympia Theatre. Most notably, in the spring of 1944 the then upcoming soprano Maria Callas sang the leading role of Santuzza in Ruggero Leoncavallo's Cavalleria rusticana, her first professional participation at a GNO production staged at the Olympia Theatre.

In 1954, the first Olympia Theatre was demolished, and three years later it was rebuilt at the same address based on architect Panos Tsolakis' designs. From 1958 on, the GNO returned to the Olympia Theatre, presenting its productions there up until 2017, when it was moved to the newly built Stavros Niarchos Foundation Cultural Center in Palaio Faliro. In 2018, the theatre was renamed to "Olympia City Music Theatre 'Maria Callas'" and repurposed for music and theatrical productions.
