= Sofokleous Street =

Street in Athens, Greece

Coordinates: 37.9811°N 23.7268°E

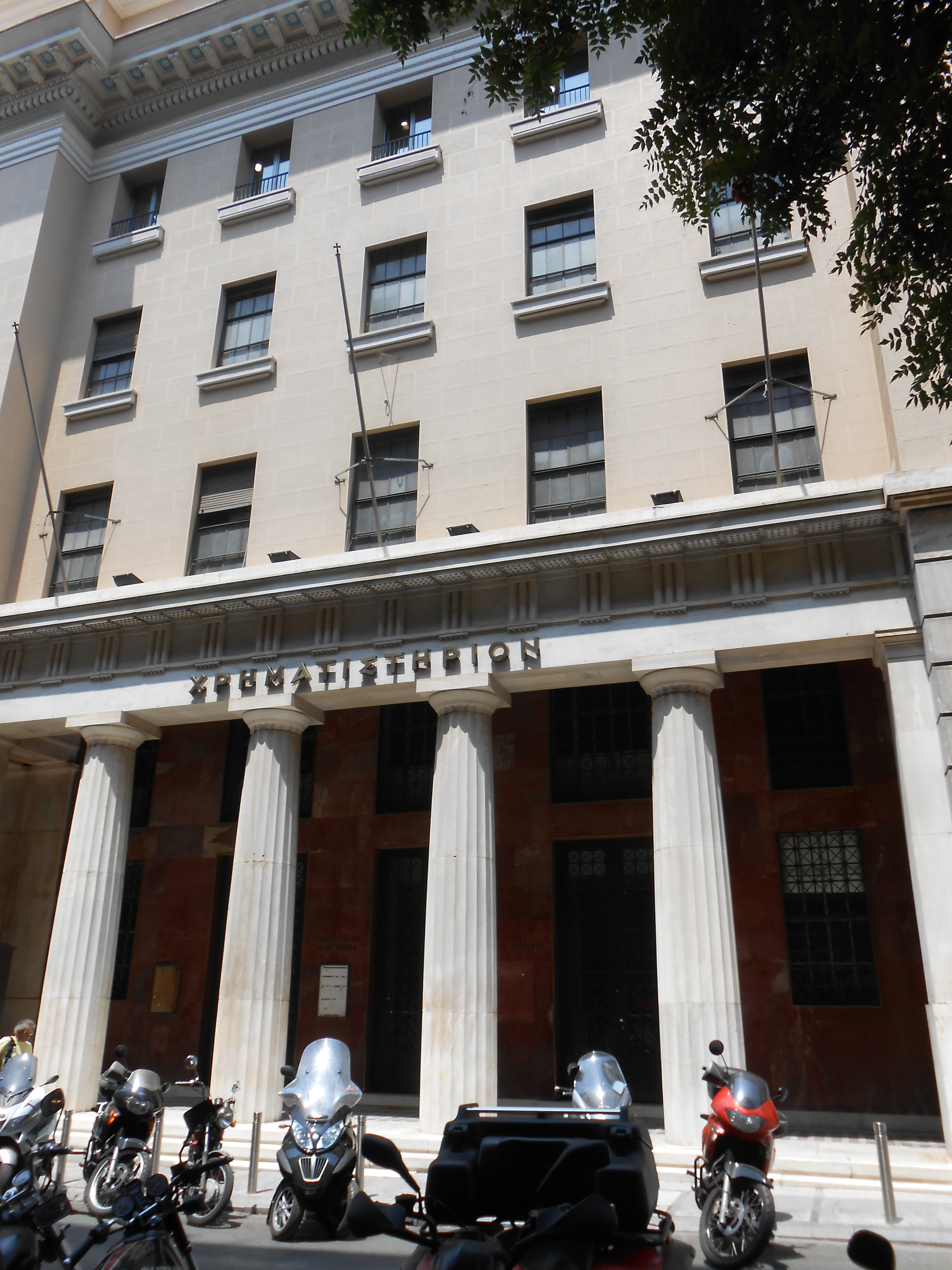
- The old Athens Stock Exchange at Sofokleous Street
- Namesake: Sophocles
- Maintained by: Municipality of Athens
- Length: 600 m (2,000 ft)
- From: Pireos Street
- Major junctions: Athinas street
- To: Pesmazoglou street and Aristeidou Street

Sofokleous Street (Greek: Οδός Σοφοκλέους, Odos Sofokleous) is a street in the downtown part of Athens, the Greek capital. It is named after the ancient Greek tragedian Sophocles. The street runs from Pireos Street and ends short from Stadiou Street at Pesmazoglou Street and Aristeidou Street. Until 2007 the Athens Stock Exchange was located in this street, near Aiolou Street on the north side. Further north lies Kotzia Square. The street is approximately 600 m long.

The nearest metro stations are Panepistimio and Omonia.

== History ==
The Athens Stock Exchange first opened in 30 Sept.1876 on the street's north side, and soon moved to the junction of Aiolou and Sofokleous streets. From 1885 until 1891 it was housed at a building owned by the brokerage firm "Hermes" at 11 Sofocleous Street. On December 19, 1934, the new building was inaugurated in a formal manner. During World War II the various "policing" measures were hindered by brokers in the "free" market engaged in buying pounds in the streets around the Sophocleous Street building. On September 21, 1999, the highest price was recorded when the index reached 6,484.38 units, operating as a landmark for smallholders, who in a few years lost more than one hundred billion euros.

Modernistic eight storey-buildings were constructed in most parts of the street while neo-classical buildings still existed. Traffic lights and street lights were introduced. Traffic lights were also introduced at Pireos, Sokratous, Athinas and Aiolou streets.

After the move of the Athens Exchange its former building was used as the venue for the 4th Athens Biennale 2013 "AGORA".

== Important buildings ==
- The old hotel Pindaros on Sofokleous 24.
- The central bank building of the National Bank of Greece at the corner of Aeolos and Sofokleous.
- The building of the Economics Department of the National and Kapodistrian University of Athens at Sofokleous 1.
- The Stoa of Athens (covered walkway) at Sofokleous 47 leading to the Theater Square.
- The Pentecostal Free Apostolic Church at Sophocleous 52.
- The former head office of Banque d'Orient

many retail stores and restaurants.

== Intersections ==
- Pireos Street
- Menandrou Street
- Sokratous Street
- Athinas Street
- Strait and Filoppoimenous Street
- Aiolou Street
- Aristeidou and Pesmetzoglou Street
