= Aiolou Street =

Street in Athens, Greece

Coordinates: 37°58′43″N 23°43′41″E

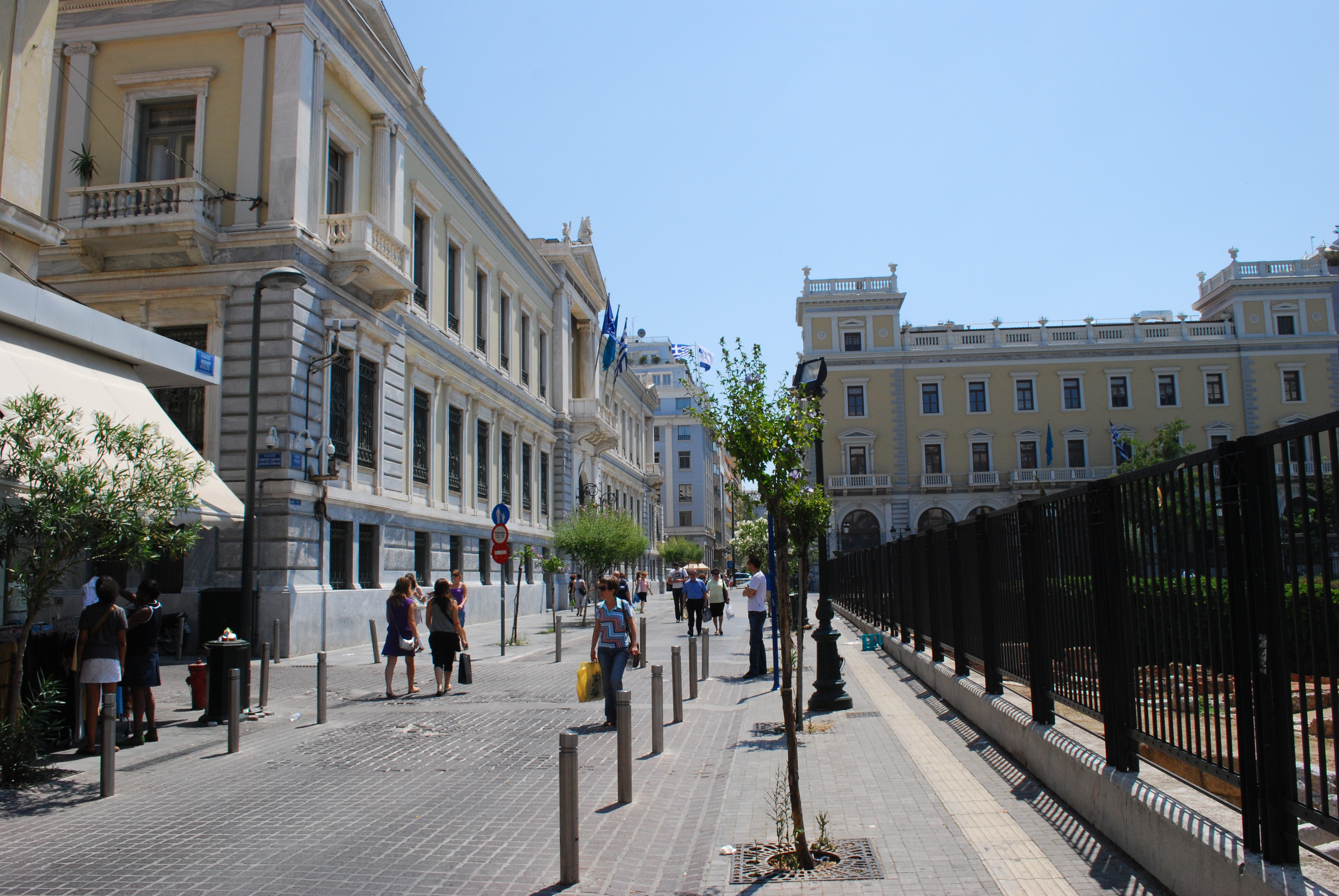
Aiolou Street

Aiolou Street (also Eolou Street; Greek: Οδός Αιóλου) is a street in downtown Athens, the Greek capital. It is named after Aeolus, the god of winds in Greek mythology. The street is one-way and originally ran entirely southbound but since the closure of Athinas Street in the late-1990s as part of the renovation plan, the part north of Lykourgou Street is one-way northbound. The street begins in Pelopidas Street further south of Ermou Street and ends in Panepistimiou Street (Eleftheriou Venizelou Avenue) and north of this street is 28 Oktovriou or Patission Street.

== History ==
Aiolou Street is the first street to be marked in the new city plan for Athens by Stamatios Cleanthis and Eduard Schaubert in 1834. By order of the father of the underage King Otto, Ludwig I of Bavaria, Cleanthis and Schaubert designed the city following the design of other major European capitals, with the primary goal to attract new residents and commerce to Athens which at the time didn't have more than 4,000 inhabitants.

The street was first laid in the 19th century and was the first street in Athens to be paved. Neoclassical buildings were built then as well and are still present today in the southern and the central part of the street. After World War II and the Greek Civil War, modern eight to ten storey buildings were built in the northern part and traffic lights were installed on Adrianou, Ermou, Evrypidou, Sofokleous, Stadiou and Panepistimiou/28 Oktovriou (Patission) intersections. The blocks around the intersection with Stadiou Street are traditionally called the Hafteia, so named after a popular 19th-century kafeneíon owned by a certain Mr. Haftis; the Hafteia were the very heart of downtown Athens market for the 19th and the better part of the 20th century.

== Name ==
The street was originally called will be called 'Aiolian Road' (Greek: Αιολική Οδός) and was known by this name until 1884, when it was renamed as Aiolou Street. Presumably, the street is named after the Tower of the Winds (the monument depicting the winds, the children of the god Aeolus).

== Intersections ==
- Pelopidou Street
- Adrianou Street - east
- Pandrosou Street
- Mitropoleos Street
- Ermou Street
- Hagias Eirinis and Athenaidos Streets
- Voreou Street - west
- Kolokotroni Street - walkway
- Miltiadou Street - east
- Vyssis Street - west
- Sosipyliotissis Street
- Evripidou Street
- Sofokleous Street
- Eupolidos and I. Stavrou Streets
- Lykourgou Street - west
- Stadiou Street
- Panepistimiou Street and Patission Street

== See also ==
- List of streets in Athens
