= Greek National Road 56 =

Trunk road in Greece

National Road 56
- Εθνική Οδός 56
- Route of the EO56 (Athens–Piraeus) and Piraeus–Skaramagas national roads, in blue

Route information
- Length: 8.47 km (5.26 mi)
- Existed: 9 July 1963–present

Major junctions
- East end: Athens
- West end: Piraeus

Location
- Country: Greece
- Regions: Attica
- Primary destinations: Athens; Piraeus

Highway system
- Highways in Greece; Motorways; National roads
← EO55	→ EO57

Greek National Road 56 (Greek: Εθνική Οδός 56), abbreviated as the EO56, is a national road in the region of Attica, Greece. The EO56 is an urban national road that branches off the EO8 in Athens and heads southwest to the port of Piraeus, via (but not exclusively) Peiraios Street. In 1995, the western end of the EO56 was also connected to the EO8 via the Piraeus–Skaramagas National Road.

== Route ==
The EO56 is officially defined as an east–west road in western Athens, running between Athens in the west and Piraeus in the east. According to the map of the national and provincial road network by the General Secretariat of Infrastructure (of the Ministry of Infrastructure and Transport) in April 2026, the EO56 mainly consists of Ermou Street and Peiraios Street, but since most of Ermou Street is pedestrianised, the eastern end follows Panagi Tsaldari Street instead, towards Omonoia Square.

Today, the EO56 connects with the EO8 in the east, and the Piraeus–Skaramagas National Road in the west. The EO56 also connects with the A1 motorway (formerly the New EO1), which bypasses Athens.

== History ==
Ministerial Decision G25871 of 9 July 1963 made Peiraios Street part of the EO56. The EO56 replaced the short-lived EO7, which existed under a royal decree from 9 August 1955 to 9 July 1963, and followed the same route as the current EO56.

== Piraeus–Skaramagas National Road ==
At the western end of the EO56, there is an unnumbered national road that leads back to the EO8 in Skaramagas, passing through or near to Drapetsona, Keratsini and Schisto: the road is about 12.4 kilometres (7.7 miles) long, and allows traffic from the industrial areas of Aspropyrgos and the Peloponnese to reach the Port of Piraeus without going through the suburbs of western Athens.

The Piraeus–Skaramagas National Road (Greek: Εθνική Οδός Πειραιά - Σκαραμαγκά) was created by Ministerial Decision DMEO/e/O/1308 of 15 December 1995, making it part of the secondary national network.
