= Church of Panagia Kapnikarea =

Byzantine church in Athens, Greece

Coordinates: 37.9763°N 23.7286°E

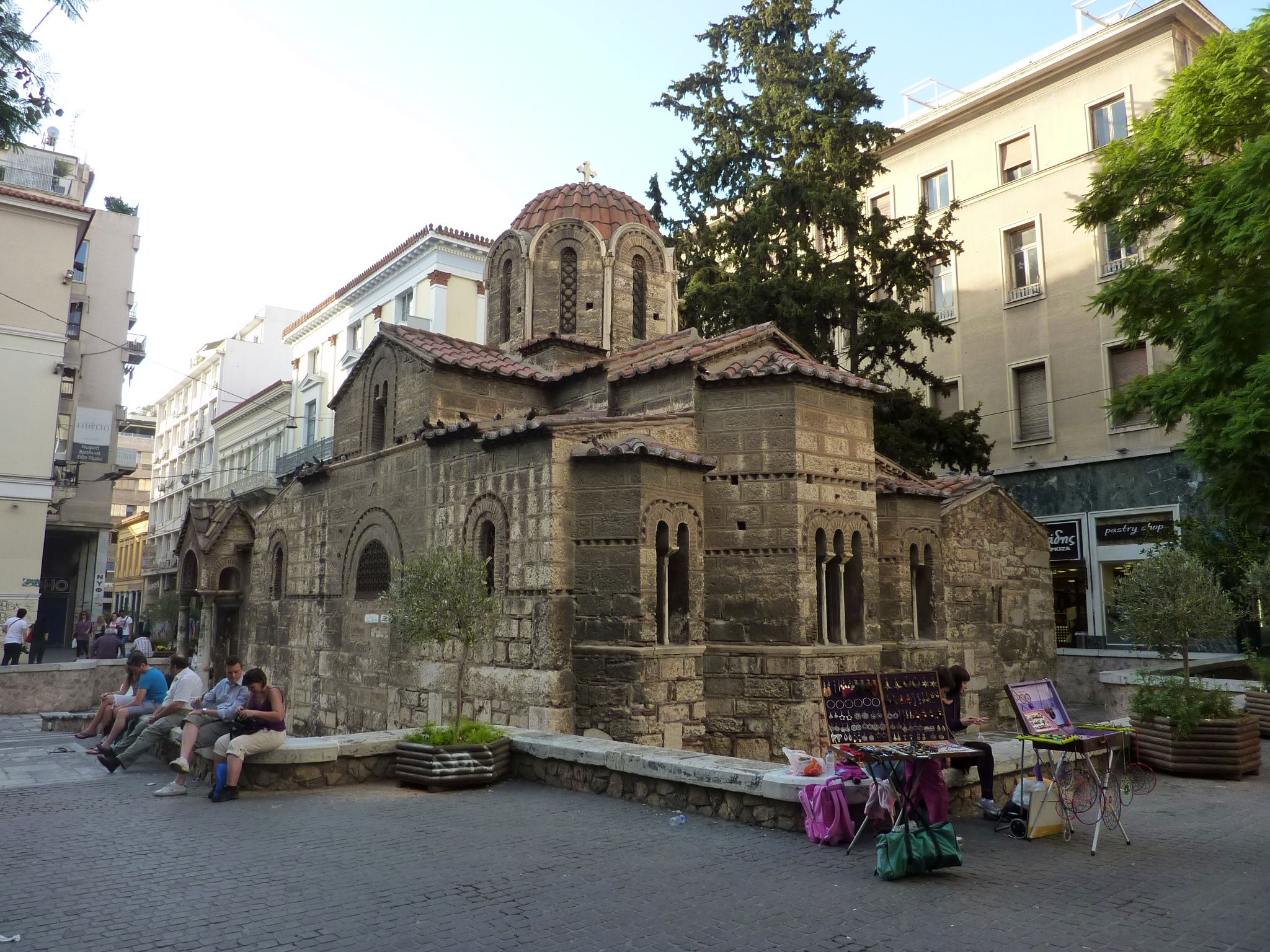
Church of Panaghia Kapnikarea

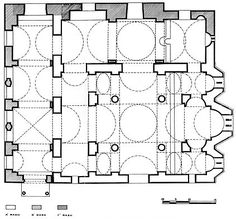
Plan

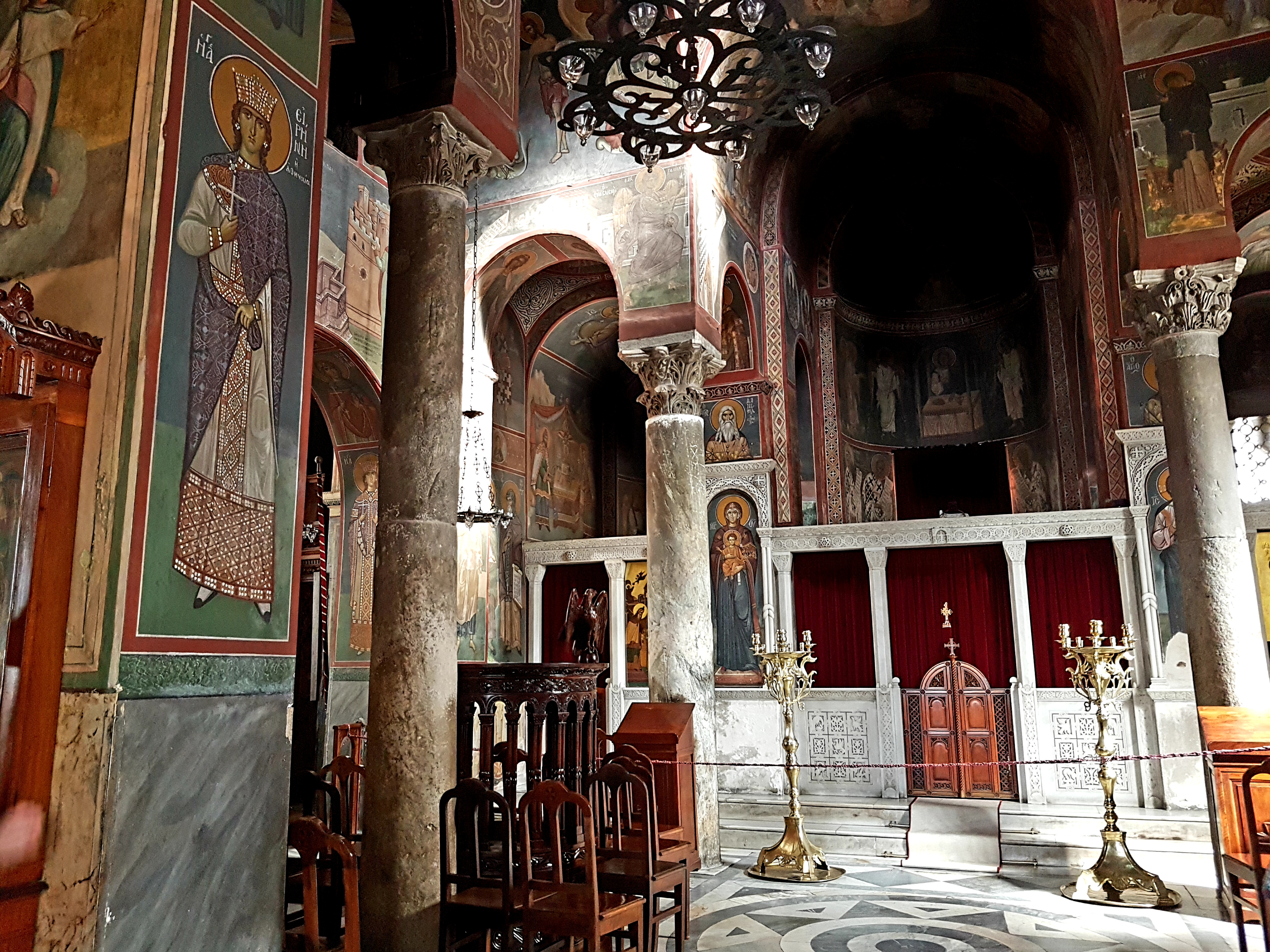
Interior

The Church of Panagia Kapnikarea (Greek: Εκκλησία της Παναγίας Καπνικαρέας) or just Kapnikarea (Greek: Καπνικαρέα) is a Greek Orthodox church and one of the oldest continuously in use churches in Athens.

== History ==
It is estimated that the church was built some time in the 11th century, perhaps around 1050. As it was common with the earlier Christian churches, this was built over an ancient Greek temple dedicated to the worship of a goddess, possibly Athena or Demeter. When King Otto I, King of the Kingdom of Greece, brought the Bavarian architect Leo von Klenze to draw the new city plan of Athens, the church was considered for demolition and it was the King of Bavaria, Ludwig I who objected the decision and saved the church.

== Architecture ==
It appears that the Kapnikarea church may have originally been the katholikon of a monastery. Presently, the building is formed by a complex of three different units attached together; these units were built in succession: a) the largest south church dedicated to the Presentation of Mary to the Temple, b) the chapel of St Barbara on the northern side; and c) the exonarthex with the propylon to the west.

The larger of the two churches, the south one, is a domed complex, cross-in-square, has been dated (on the basis of morphological criteria) to just after the middle of the 11th century.

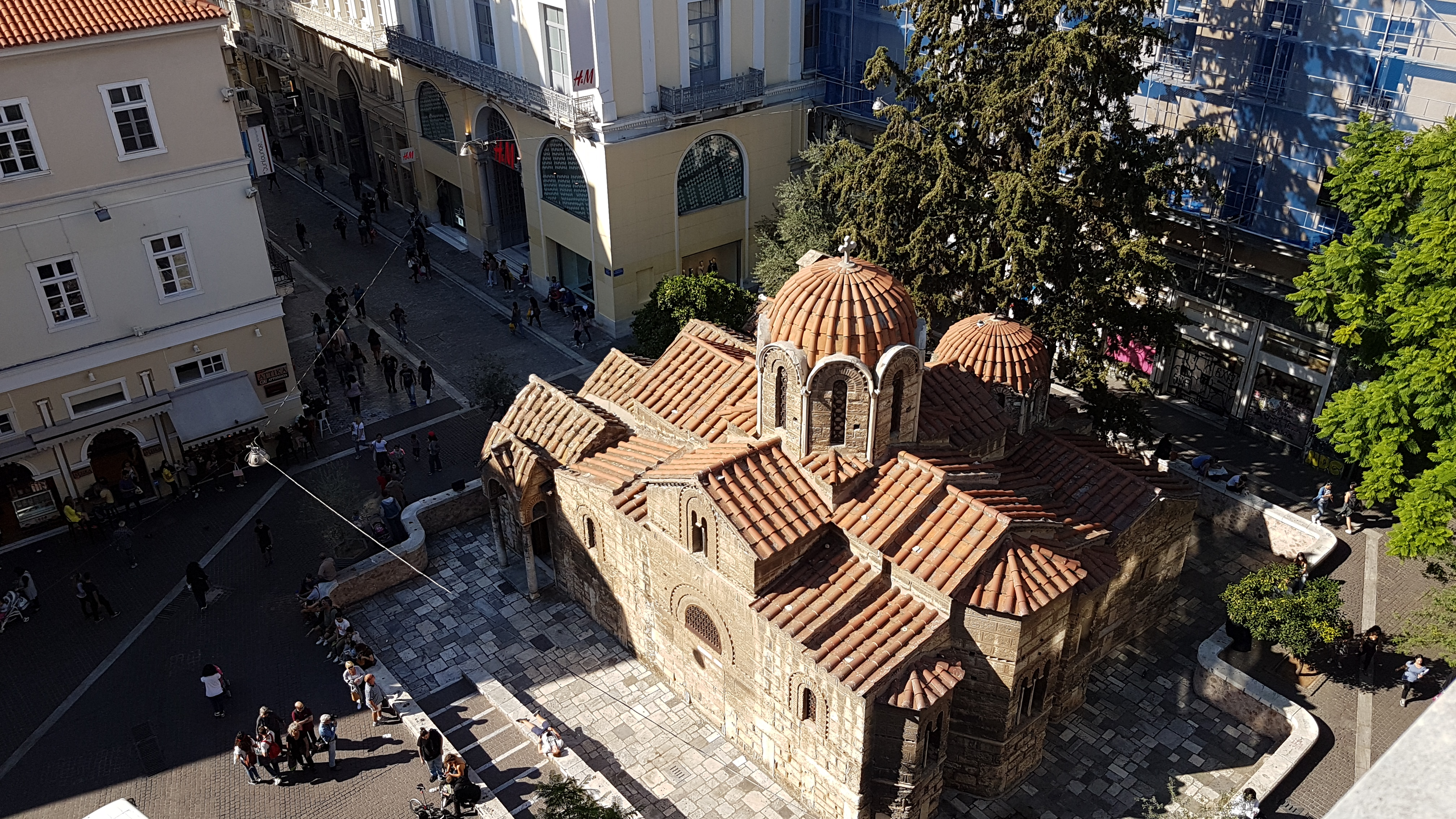
View from above

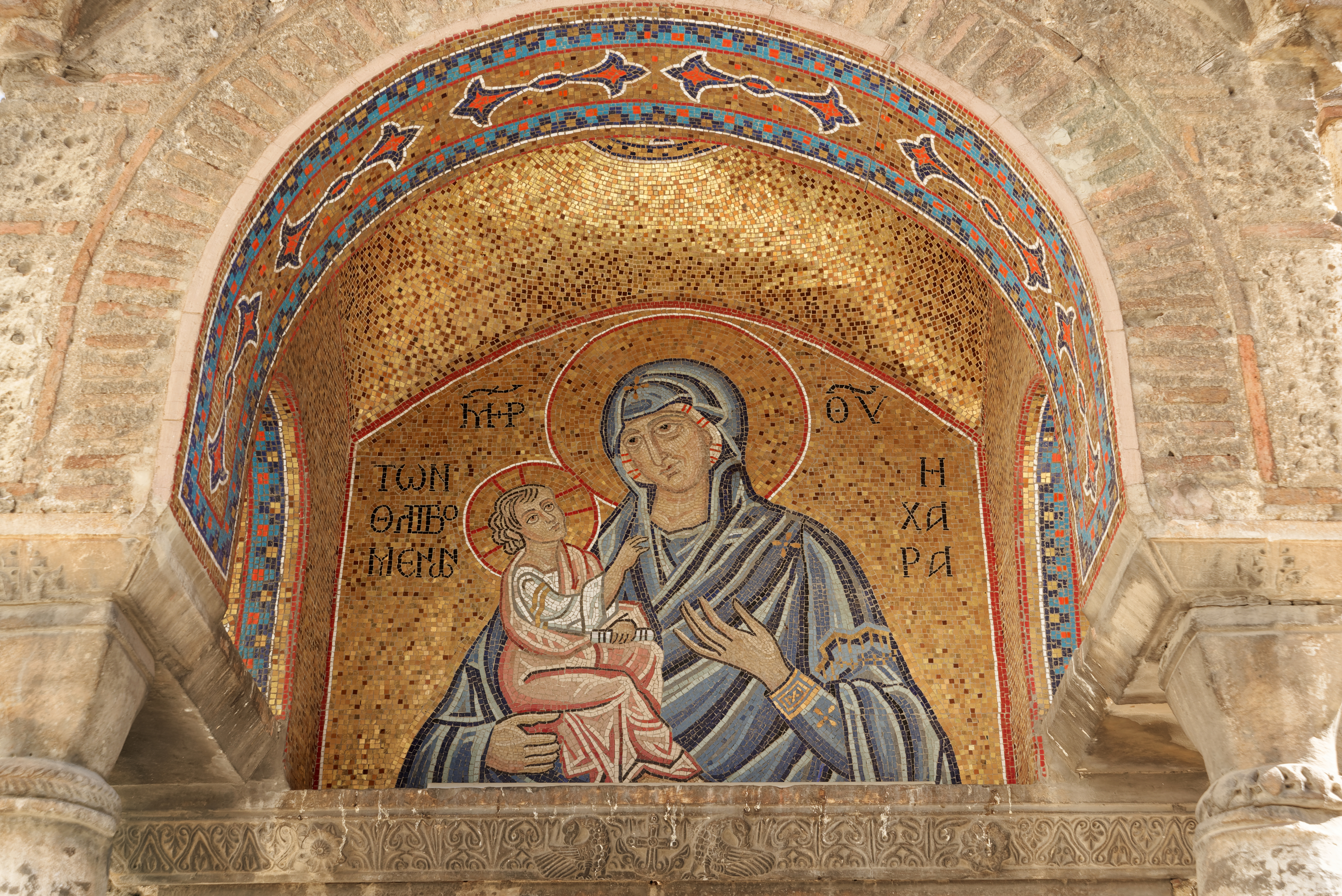
Mosaic of the Panagia and an infant Christ at the south portico

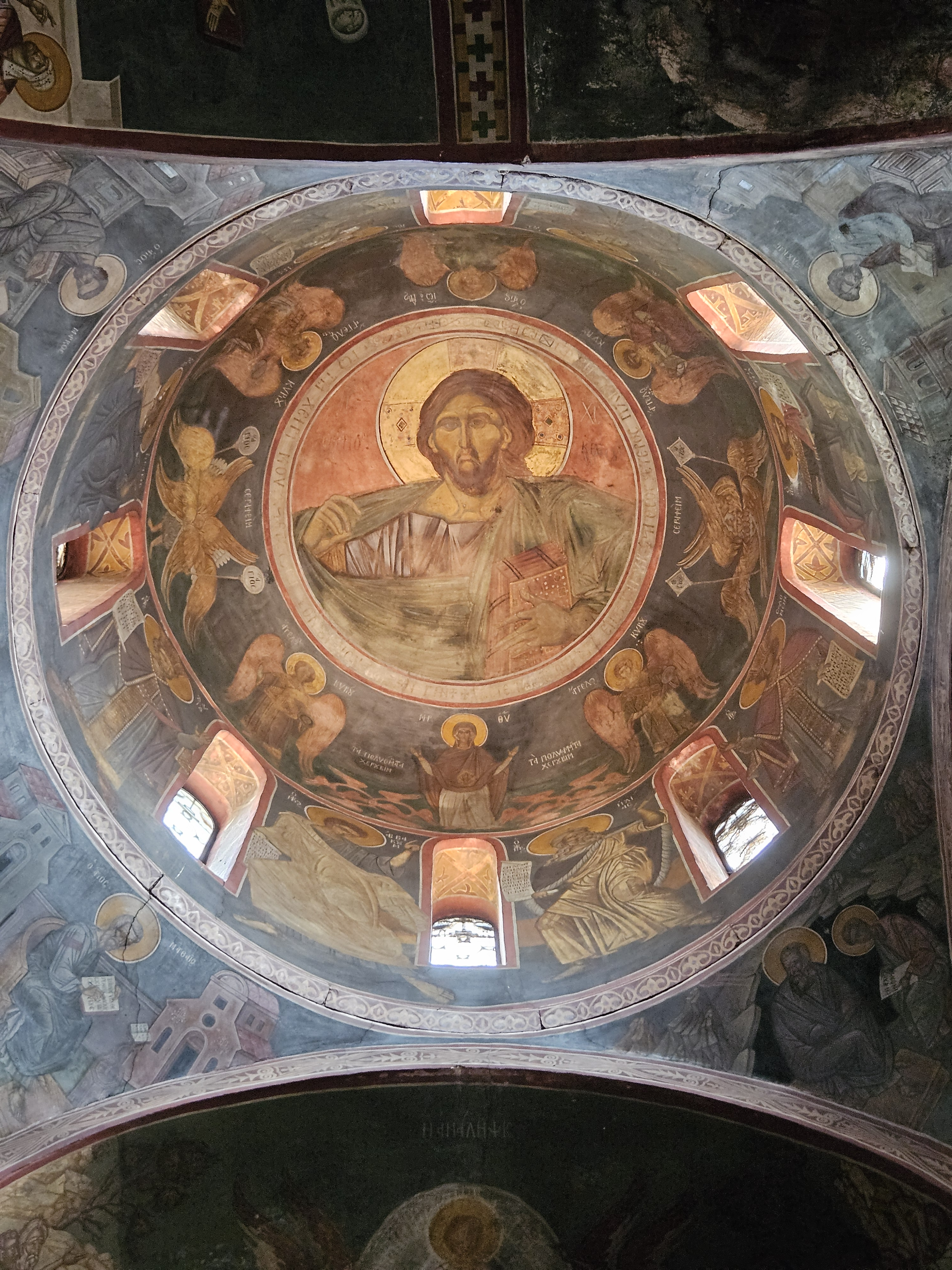
Dome

== Location ==
The church is located in the center of the modern city of Athens, right in the middle of the high-traffic shopping area of Ermou street, at the edge of the Plaka district.

== See also ==
- Omorfoklissia
