= Stadiou Street =

Major thoroughfare in Athens, Greece

Coordinates: 37.9800°N 23.7316°E

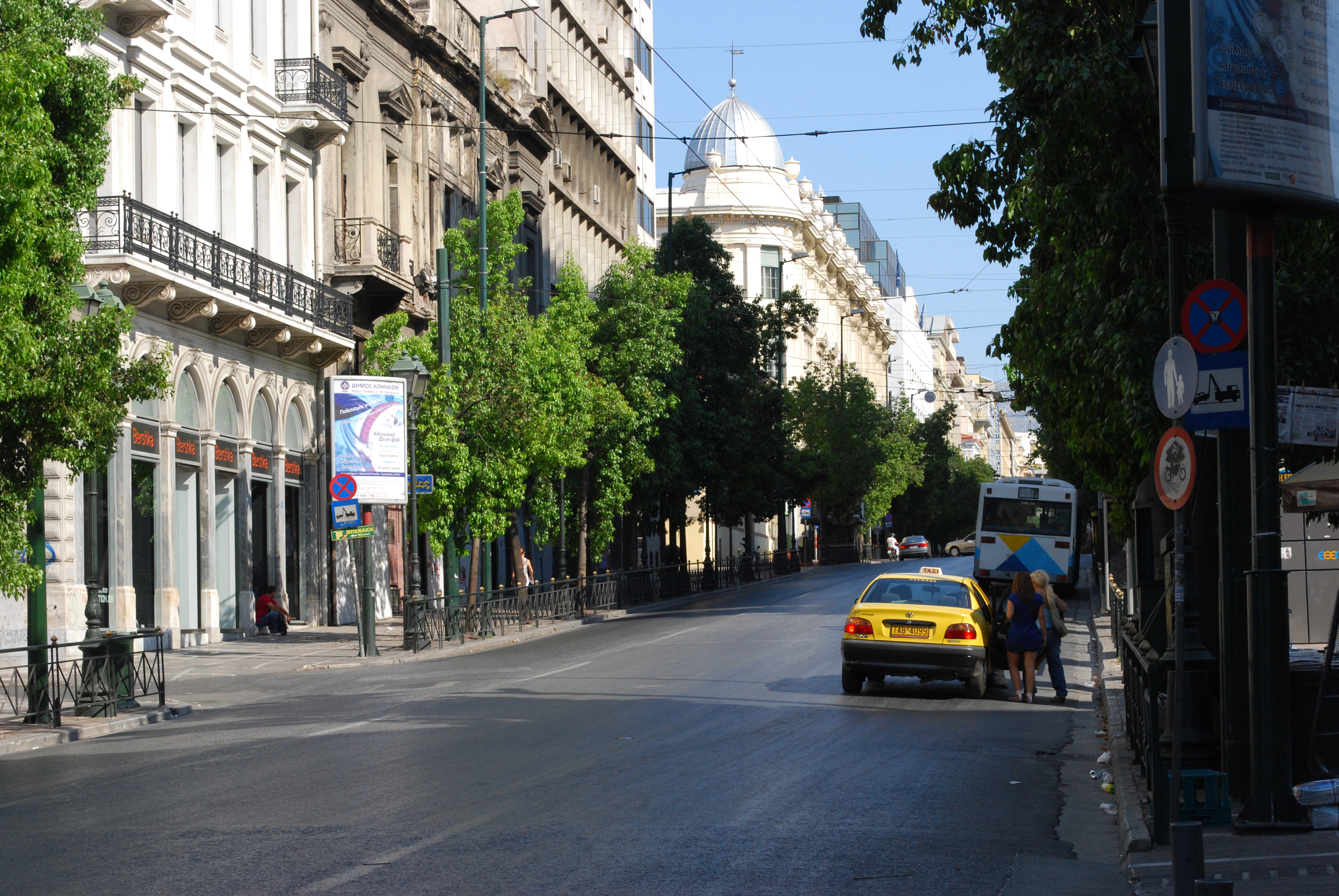
Stadiou Street

Stadiou Street (Greek: Οδός Σταδíου, Odós Stadíou, "Stadium Street") is Athens' major street linking the Omonoia and Syntagma Squares. It runs diagonally and is one-way from northwest to southeast. The street is named after the ancient Panathenaic Stadium located about 3 km southeast of the downtown core and is aligned directly with the ancient stadium.

This street had existed during ancient times. The modern street was originally designed to extend all the way to the stadium. The project was cut short for lack of funding, but the name remained. The street was officially renamed "Churchill Street" after World War II in honour of the British prime minister, but Athenians usually remained faithful to the traditional name of the street. The same is true of the other two main thoroughfares of downtown Athens, which run parallel to each other and to Stadiou Street: "Eleftherios Venizelos Street" and "Roosevelt Street" were likewise never adopted by the public, which insisted on the traditional University and Akadimias Street respectively.

Famous buildings on the street are the Bank of Greece building, and the Old Parliament. Klafthmonos Square is a square that is located off the central part of this street; its name literally means "Lamentation Square" (from Κλαυθμών, Klafthmōn, weeping or lamentation) and the Ministry of the Interior is located by it. In the 19th century, Greek public servants were not permanent but could be hired or sacked on a minister's whim. Following each election, they would gather at this square in order to find out what the election results were: in case of victory of a party other than the one that hired them, they would lament their impending unemployment. Abiding with the aforementioned tradition of downtown Athens, Klafthmonos Square was officially renamed "National Reconciliation Square" but retains its popular name in almost every context.

== History ==
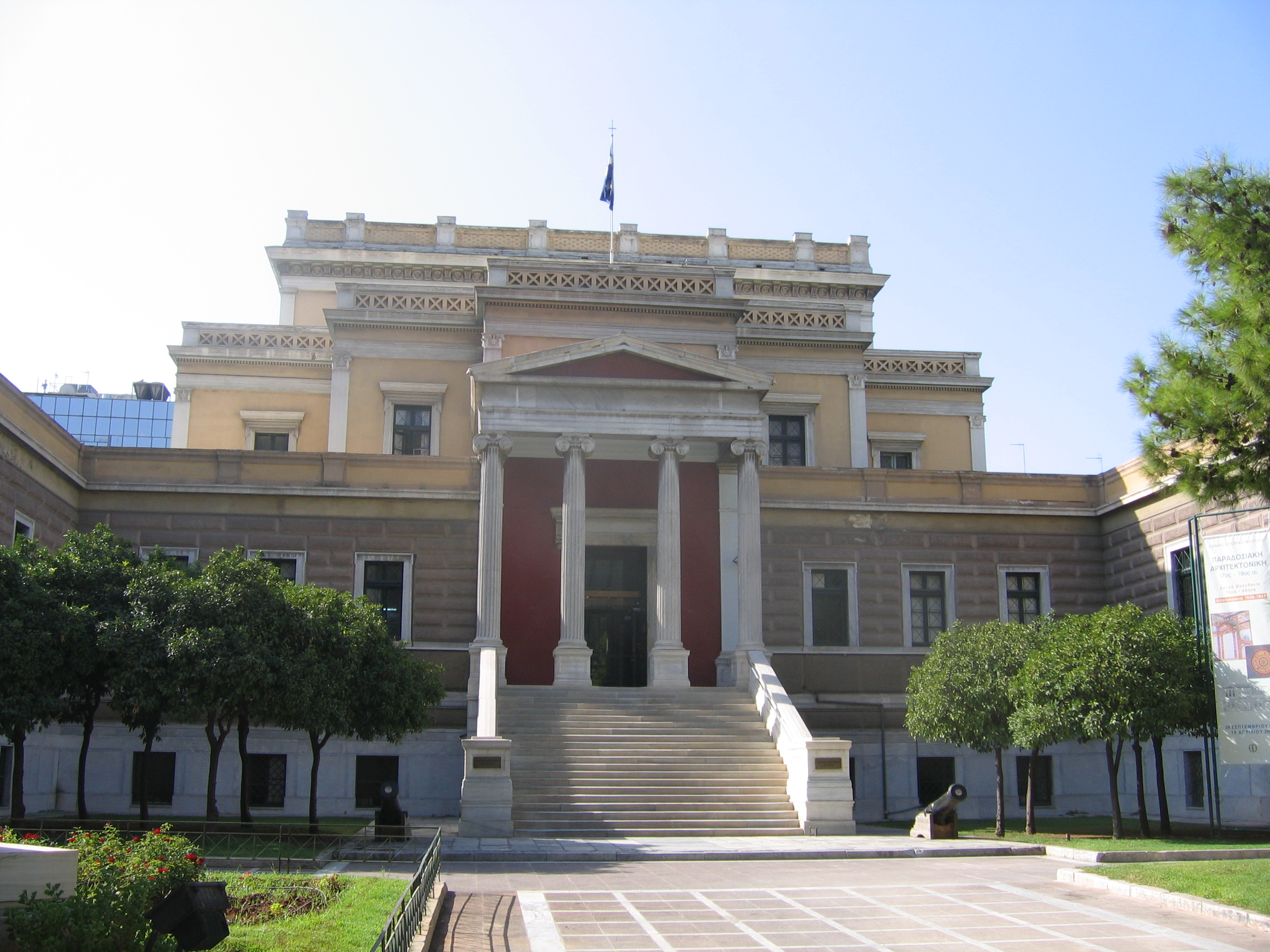
The Old Parliament House

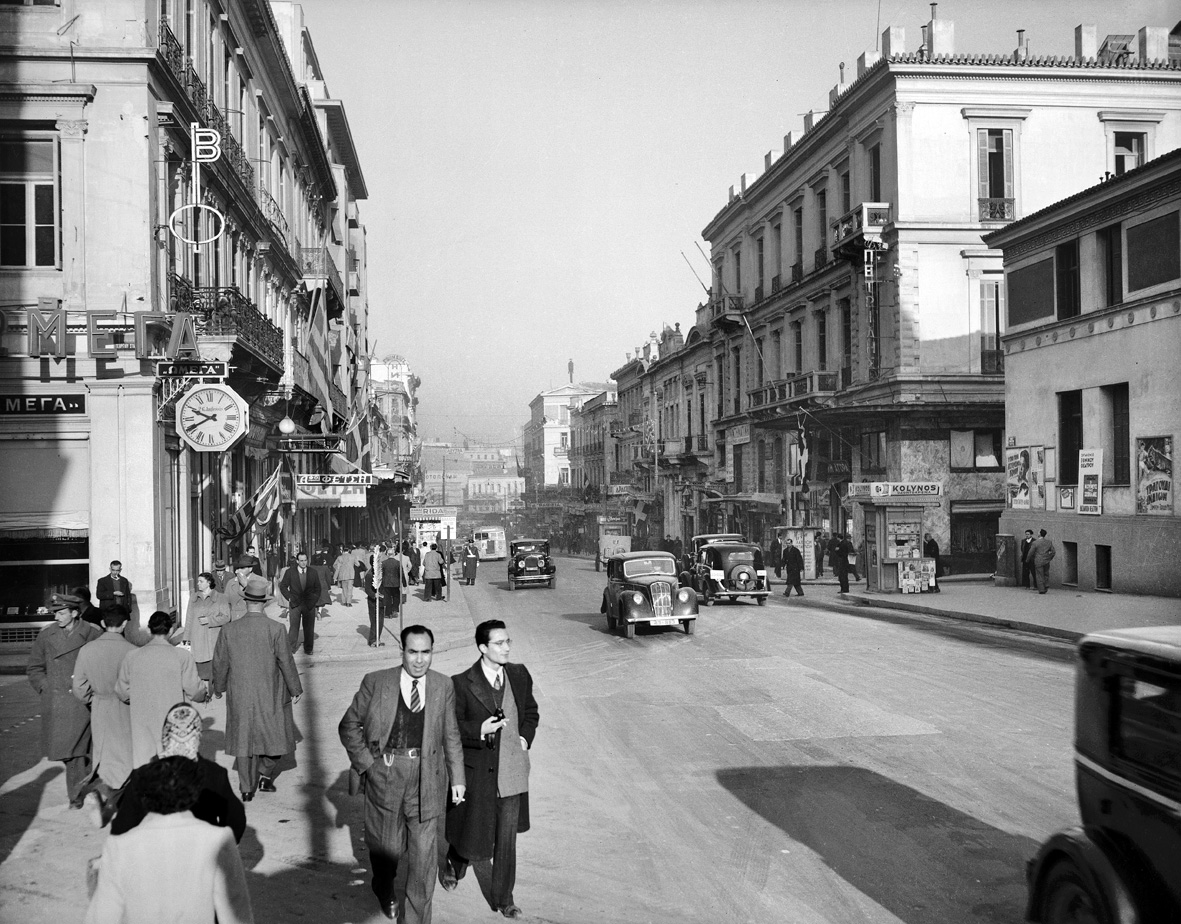
Stadiou Street in the late 1930s

The modern street was first rebuilt in the early to mid-19th century. The street was later paved. Streetcars and trolleys were added in the 20th century and the street was mainly two-way. Old two and three storey neo-classical buildings were located in this street. After the Greek Civil War, it became one-way with three lanes and parking spaces. In the 1990s several buildings were demolished and eight and ten storey buildings were built in their place; several neo-classical buildings survive. It is mainly a shopping street, with upscale shops clustering towards Syntagma Square and lower scale ones towards Omonoia Square. Shopping traditionally focused on clothing and tailoring, which spread from intersecting Aiolou Street, while the area around and off Klafthmonos Square was in earlier decades the hub of the electrical appliance market.

== Intersections ==
- Aiolou Street
- Santaroza Street
- Stavrou Street
- Pesmatzoglou Street
- Dragatsanou Street
- Korai Street (walkway)
- Paparrigopoulou Street
- Lada and Edward Law Streets
- Omirou Street (no access)
- Amerikis and Kolokotroni Streets
- Voukourestiou Street (no access)

== See also ==
- Marfin bank arson – Stadiou 23
