= Ermou Street =

Street in Athens, Greece

Coordinates: 37°58′35.9″N 23°43′32.6″E

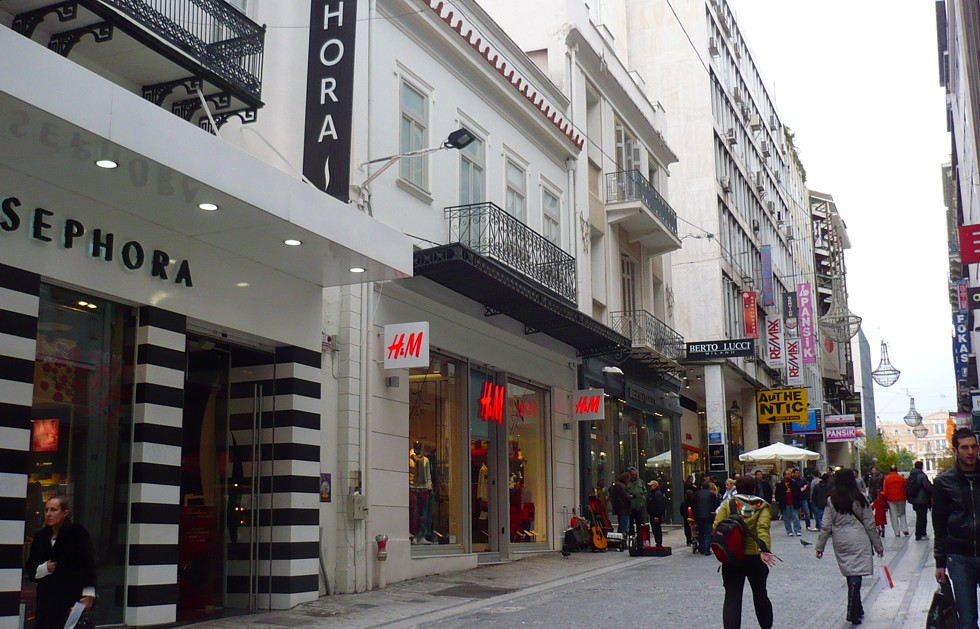
The section near Syntagma Square. The parliament on the right.

Ermou Street (Greek: Οδός Ερμού, romanized: Odos Ermou, lit. 'Hermes Street') is a one and a half kilometer-long road in central Athens, Greece, connecting Kerameikos archaeological site with the Syntagma Square through Monastiraki, Psiri and Thiseio.

It consists of three sections: The east (from Filellinon Street to Aiolou Street, app. 700m long) which is a pedestrian zone and the city's best-known and busiest shopping street, the middle (from Aiolou Street to Agion Asomaton str.) and the west (from Agion Asomaton to Peiraios Street) a pedestrian zone also.

With fashion shops and shopping centres promoting most international brands, it is in the top five most expensive shopping streets in Europe, and the tenth most expensive retail street in the world. Nearby, the renovated Army Fund building in Panepistimiou Street includes the "Attica" department store and several upmarket designer stores.

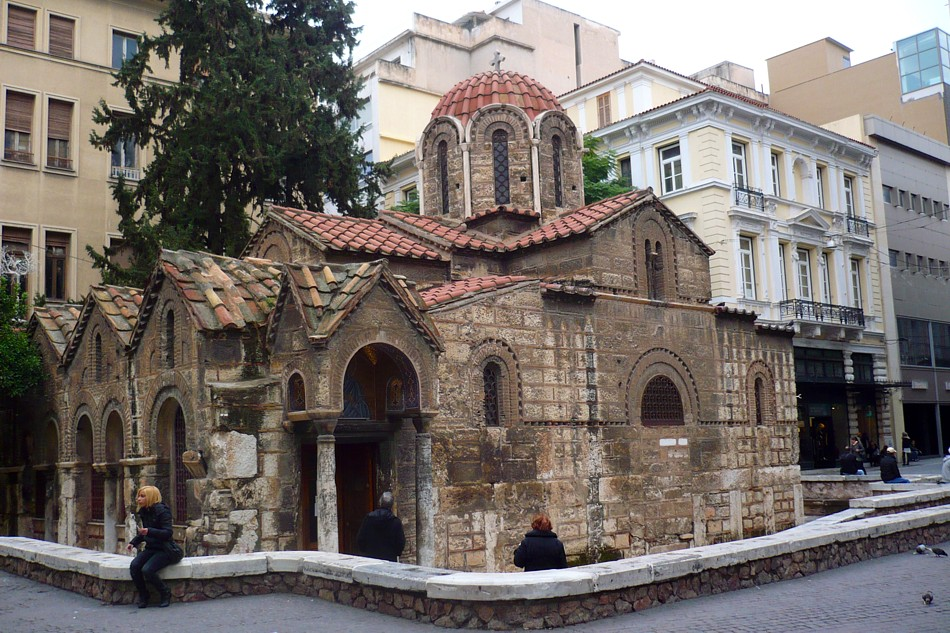
The Byzantine Church of Panagia Kapnikarea

One of the oldest churches in Athens, the Byzantine Church of Panagia Kapnikarea is in a small square, on the east section of Ermou Street, while the small Holy Archangels Church lies at the western end, at Agion Asomaton Square.

The western section of the road which was remodeled for the 2004 Olympic Games constitutes the ending of the Grand Promenade, the pedestrian walkway around the Acropolis, part of the city's Archaeological Unification Project.

Ermou Street is twinned with the Okurayama Street in Kanagawa Prefecture - Japan since August 1, 1988.

== History ==
The street was one of the first roads designed in modern Athens and one of the main axes of Athens' first town plan made by the architects Kleanthis and Schaubert in 1833. In contrast to the section from Syntagma Square to Aiolou Street which until now is a base for retail trade, public services cafes and hotels, and a pedestrian zone since 1997 (the pedestrianization started in 1996), the section of the street from Agion Asomaton street to Peiraios Street was linked with the industrial land use of Peiraios Street in the 19th and 20th century, with wholesale, the operation of Line 1 of the Athens Metro, and the arterial roads Peiraios Street and Iera Odos Street.

=== 2003 section remodeling ===
To improve the image of the area and enhance the archaeological site of Kerameikos and its integration with city life, the section from Agion Asomaton street to Peiraios street was remodeled into a pedestrian way as part of the Grand Promenade project, which is subsumed under the general work for the unification of the archaeological sites of Athens. The remodeling started by the Unification of Archaeological Sites of Athens S.A. on Wednesday 9 July 2003, and now the section constitutes the ending of the Grand Promenade that begins at Panathinaiko Stadium (Vasilissis Olgas Av.) and continues through Dionysiou Areopagitou and Agiou Pavlou streets.

== Intersections ==
Major intersections from west to east:

- Peiraios Street
- Agion Asomaton (Agion Asomaton Square)
- Athinas Street
- Aiolou Street
- Filellinon Street (Syntagma Square)

== See also ==
- List of streets in Athens
