= Peiraios Street =

Avenue in Athens, Greece

Coordinates: 37.9580°N 23.6847°E

Peiraios Street (Greek: Οδός Πειραιώς, Odos Peiraios) is a main road in Athens, Greece, linking the center of the city with the port of Piraeus. The island areas of the road are lined with trees, and historically the avenue runs over parts of the north wall and ancient road of Phaleron. It is 10 km long passes and though Central Athens, the suburban town of Moschato, and northern Tavros.

Peiraios Street is part of the EO56, a national road in Greece that runs between Athens and Piraeus: however, the EO56 does not exclusively consist of Peiraios Street. Major intersections and an interchange include:

- Karaoli Dimitriou Street
- Kifissou Avenue
- the Konstantinopouleos Avenue junction
- Apostolou Pavlou Street with Vasileiou tou Megalou
- Ermou
- Thermopylon Street
- Sofokleous Street
- Deligiorgi Street
- Sokratous Street
