= Uncial 0161 =

- New Testament manuscript
- Text: Matthew 22:7-46
- Date: 8th century
- Script: Greek
- Now at: National Library of Greece
- Size: 22 x 16 cm
- Type: mixed
- Category: III

Uncial 0161 (in the Gregory-Aland numbering), ε 019 (von Soden), is a Greek uncial manuscript of the New Testament, dated paleographically to the 8th century.

== Description ==
The codex contains a small part of the Gospel of Matthew 22:7-46, on one parchment leaf (22 cm by 16 cm). It is written in two columns per page, 37 lines per page, in small uncial letters. It is a palimpsest, the upper text contains Greek notes, bound with the minuscule codex 1419.

The Greek text of this codex is mixed, but with strong the Byzantine element. Aland placed it in Category III.

It was the last uncial manuscript classified by Caspar René Gregory. Gregory saw it in 1904.

Currently it is dated by the INTF to the 8th century.

The codex currently is housed at the Εθνική Βιβλιοθήκη (139, ff. 245–246) in Athens.

== See also ==
- List of New Testament uncials
- Textual criticism
