= Patission Street =

Street in Athens, Greece

Coordinates: 38°0′9.94″N 23°44′2.8″E

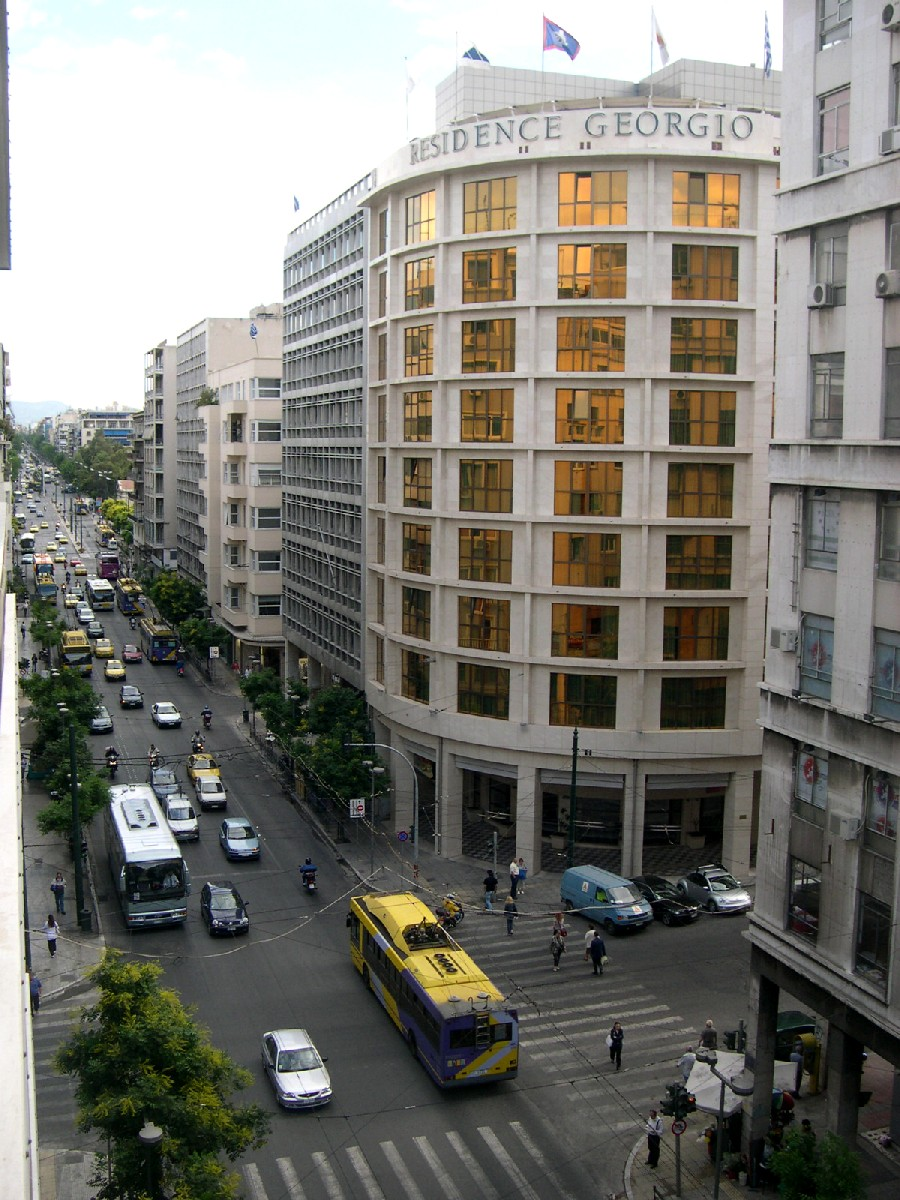
- Patission street near Halkokondili street to the north.
- Former name(s): 28 October Street
- Maintained by: Municipality of Athens
- Length: 4.5 km (2.8 mi)
- From: Panepistimiou Street
- Major junctions: Alexandras Avenue; Evelpidon; Galatsiou Avenue; Laskaratou
- To: Leoforos Ionias & Agias Lavras, Ano patisia

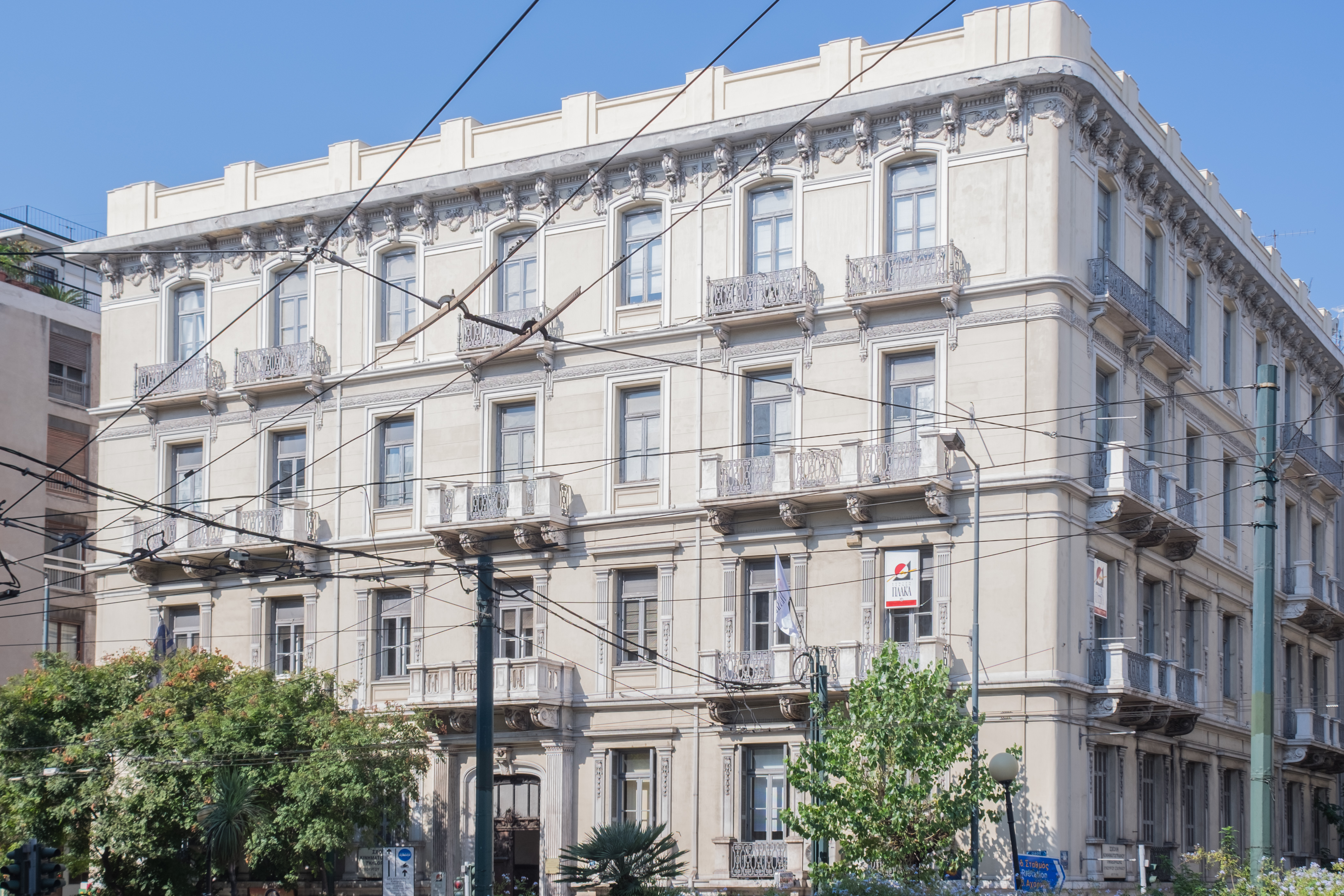
Isaias mansion

Patision Street (also Patission; Greek: Οδός Πατησίων) is one of the major streets in central Athens, Greece. Though it is known as Patision, its name for its stretch between Panepistimiou Street and Amerikis Square, was changed to 28 October Street, commemorating the day in 1940 that the Greek dictator Ioannis Metaxas refused the Italian dictator Benito Mussolini's ultimatum that Greece submit to Italian control, thus starting the Greco-Italian War.

Patision Street connects the area known as Patisia with Omonoia Square in the center of Athens. It is crowded by bus and trolley bus lines, which connect the city center with Kypseli (trolley lines 2, 4, 9), Lamprini (trolley lines 5, 13, 14), Patisia (trolley line 11), Nea Filadelfeia (trolley line 3), Perissos (bus lines 605, 054), Marousi (bus line A8) and Galatsi (bus line 608). It is a southbound one-way route with a northbound bus lane until it meets Marnis street, and it has three lanes per direction until Amerikis Square.

== History ==
- The landforming of the road began in 1841 and was based on pre-existing rural roads.
- During King Otto's reign, the road was often honored by the royal couple.
- In the 1870s, there was a small village named Patisia, which was included in the city of Athens and distinguished in Upper and Lower Patissia.
- In the 1880s, there walked the horsemen of the newly created, by Efstratios Rallis, "Philippos Company".
- On 23 April 1882 was launched the horse-powered tram from Patission to Syntagma.
- In the 20th century, new neoclassical, art-deco and modernist buildings were built: Livieratos Palace (Patision 55 and Epirus), G. Isaia (Patision 65 and Julianos).
- In 1903, Panagiotis Koutalianos, in an open-air theater opposite the Archaeological Museum, demonstrated his muscular power with various improvised exercises.
- Patission was planted in 1908 with the first official division of the city of Athens – following the study of Athanasios Georgiadis – connecting Patisia with Omonia Square in the center of Athens. Then the first electric trams arrived.
- In Chaetia (Patision 8), next to Alaska, on Sunday, 20 September 1942, the small ΠΕΑΝ resistance group organized a mass sabotage in the building of the Greek Nazi organization ESPO that recruited young people from Greece for Wehrmacht.
- During December 1944, the General Security building was blown up in the corner of Patission and Stournari street, by the forces of ELAS.
- In 1946, after the Occupation, it was renamed 28 October to celebrate the national anniversary of liberation.
- On 17 November 1973, the Athens Polytechnic Uprising took place.
- On 18 December 1980, the Minion Mall was wrapped in flames.

== Notable buildings on Patission Street ==
- National Archaeological Museum
- National Technical University of Athens
- The renovated atrium of the National Archaeological Museum is an oasis of freshness and aesthetic pleasure for the Athenians and visitors of the city. Itamos, acanthus, ivy, pyxus, angelica, water lily, ellipse, olives, cypresses are some of the 700 plants available in the garden.
- Athens University of Economics and Business.
- Casa di Italia (Italian Institute)
- Maria Callas' house
- Isaias Mansion presently houses Plakas Art School.
- The Acropole Palace, the emblematic hotel, was built between 1926–1928 and operated as a hotel for the high society of Athens until 1980. It was declared a preservable building in 1991.
- The building of the Leontios School was founded in 1923 at the end of Patission Street.
- The Radio City Cinema enjoyed great glory in the 1950s, such as the visit by Elizabeth Taylor in 1958.
- Cinemas "Angela", "Trianon", "Athena", "Broadway", "Attica", "Aello".
- The oldest apartment building in Athens is at the intersection of Patission and Laskaratou.
- The hotel Melia (former Residence Georgio) is shown in the image at the corner of Chalkokondyli and Patision.

== Intersections ==
- Galatsiou Avenue
- Alexandras Avenue
- Panepistimiou Street
- Aiolou – the continuation of Patission Avenue to the south
