= Holy Archangels Church, Thiseio =

Holy Archangels Church
- Ιερός Ναός Αγίων Ασωμάτων
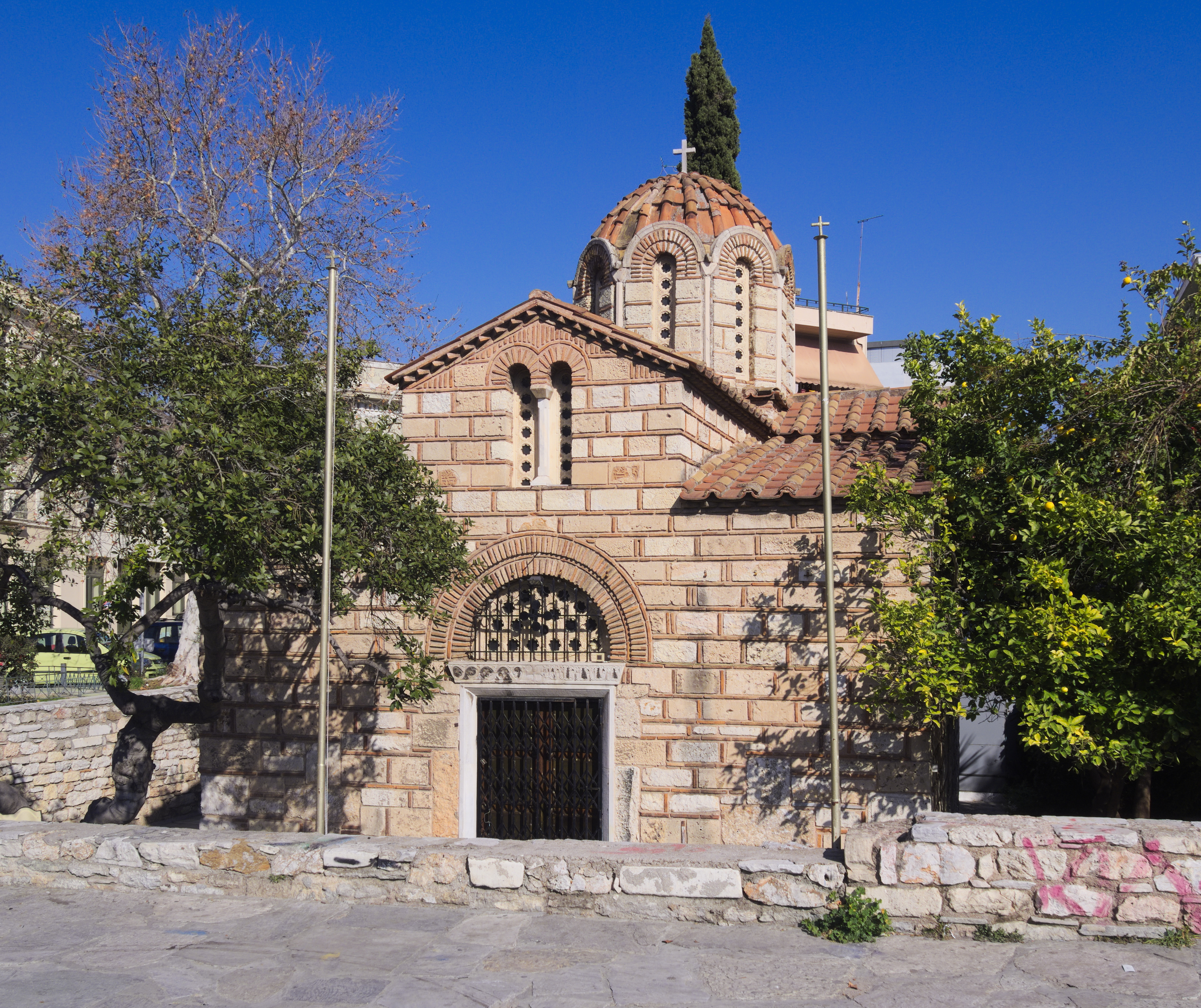

- 37°58′40″N 23°43′16″E
- Location: Thiseio, Athens
- Country: Greece
- Language: Greek
- Denomination: Greek Orthodox

History
- Status: Open
- Dedication: Holy Archangels
- Dedicated: November 8

Architecture
- Completed: 11th century

Administration
- Metropolis: Archbishopric of Athens

The Church of the Holy Archangels (Greek: Άγιοι Ασώματοι, romanized: Agioi Asomatoi, lit. 'Holy Incorporeal Ones') is a church of the Byzantine era and is located in Athens, a short distance from the Theseion, on Ermou Street and in the square of the same name (Agion Asomaton Square).

== Historical evidence ==
Although clear chronological references are missing, experts estimate that the small church of the Holy Archangels was built in the second half of the 11th century or in the 12th century. Over the centuries, it received many changes, especially during the 19th and 20th centuries, as a result of which its original form was altered. In 1959-1960 works were carried out to restore and restore it to its original form. Today it is about two meters below street level.

== Architecture ==
It is a cruciform temple inscribed with an Athenian dome, which rests on four columns and is a representative sample of the Athenian school of church building of that period. The lower parts of the side walls are formed by large stones, placed in the shape of a cross, characteristic of many temples of this period. Its facades were decorated with a frieze of clay tiles with relief decoration of old Arabic script (Kufic), two of which are built into the western face of the temple.

The horseshoe arch over the northern entrance is also of Islamic inspiration. These are decorative elements imitating oriental patterns and perhaps associated with the presence of a small community of Arab merchants in Athens. It was restored in 1960, when later additions were removed and restored to its original form. During the restoration work, worn frescoes from a later period, possibly late Byzantine, were uncovered, and a silver case with holy relics of an unknown saint was found in the Holy Altar.

== Use ==
The church of the Holy Archangels functions as a parish church serving the religious needs of the Orthodox Christians of the region and belongs to the Holy Archdiocese of Athens of the Orthodox Church. It celebrates on November 8, a day in which the Orthodox Church honors the angelic powers.

== Sources ==
- Σοφοκλής Γ. Δημητρακόπουλος, Εκκλησίες και Μοναστήρια των Αθηνών, έκδοση "ΑΛΛΗΛΕΓΓΥΗ", Αθήνα 2006, σελ. 116–118.
- Ευστάθιος Γ. ΣΤΙΚΑΣ, Ο ναός των Αγίων Ασωμάτων «Θησείου», Δελτίον Χριστιανικής Αρχαιολογικής Εταιρείας, 19|1960, 115-126
- Υπουργείο Πολιτισμού, Ναός Αγίων Ασωμάτων, Αθήνα
- Βυζαντινή Αθήνα, Άγιοι Ασώματοι Θησείου
