= Gospel Book (National Library of Greece, Codex 2603) =

Codex 2603, the Four Gospels, is a historic codex held by the National Library of Greece. The book is attributed to scribe Matthew of the Hodegon Monastery, the so-called thutorakendutès.

The codex shows two full-page miniatures of the Evangelists Mark and John, three headpieces and decorated initial letters. Mark the Evangelist seats in front of two tall buildings adorned with Hellenistic motifs. He appears to be sharpening a reed. John the Evangelist is dictating the Gospel to his student Prochoros who seats opposite of evangelist John.

It includes Greek inscriptions.
