= Tatiana Mamaki =

Greek dancer and choreographer (1921–2007)

Tatiana Mamaki Τατιάνα Μαμάκη
- Born: 1921; Kiev, Ukraine
- Died: 2007; Athens, Greece
- Occupation(s): dancer, choreographer

Tatiana Varouti Mamaki (Kiev, 1921-Athens, 23 January 2007) was a notable Greek dancer and choreographer.

== Life and work ==
She studied dance in Athens at Raymons School and later in Poland where she worked at the Warsaw Opera as a dancer; in 1939 she returned to Athens to work for the Greek National Opera. On 5 March 1940 the Greek National Opera had its first official opening with the inaugurating Johann Strauss operetta, Die Fledermaus, in which Mamaki was Prima ballerina. She remained in this position for almost ten years, dancing in a long series of productions. In 1949 Mamaki left for Paris with a scholarship in choreography studies at the renowned Preobrazenski School, and on her return to Athens was hired from the Greek National Opera as choreographer. In 1952 she was invited to attend advanced lessons of choreography at the Sadler's Wells Theatre in London.

Mamaki founded the Athens School of Ballet with Elen Tsoukala-Pfefer (1955–1958), with some of her most unforgettable performances including those of Faust with Nikos Moschonas in Athens and Norma with Maria Callas in Epidavrus during 1960. She collaborated with the State Theatre of Northern Greece and the National Theatre of Cyprus, also acting as choreographer for a number of film productions.

She married the musician and composer Leonidas Zoras, and later Achilleas Mamakis. Following the death of the latter she continued his radio programme The theatre on the microphone at the National Radiophone Institute (EIR), later transferring it to television.

== Legacy ==
Mamaki was the recipient of a French Government medal for contributions to Arts, Sciences and Letters. Greece awarded her the Koula Pratsika medal of honour for her lifetime contribution.

== Sources ==
- «Τα Νέα», 26 Ιανουαρίου 2007, A tribute to Mamaki by Ta Nea daily
