= National Library of Greece =

- Εθνική Βιβλιοθήκη της Ελλάδος

- The Stavros Niarchos Foundation Cultural Center, headquarters of the organization since 2017
- 37°56′23″N 23°41′30″E
- Location: Athens
- Established: 1832 (194 years ago)
- Branches: 2 (Agia Paraskeví and Nea Chalkidona)

Collection
- Items collected: Books, journals, newspapers, magazines, multimedia and manuscripts
- Criteria for collection: Material that is produced in Greece as well as Material that is produced abroad, but is connected with Greece in any language and form.

Other information
- Director: Chrysa E. Nikolaou
- Website: www.nlg.gr

The National Library of Greece (Greek: Εθνική Βιβλιοθήκη της Ελλάδος, romanized: Ethnikí Vivliothíki tis Elládos) is the main public library of Greece, located in Athens. Founded by Ioannis Kapodistrias in 1832, its mission is to locate, collect, organize, describe and preserve the perpetual evidence of Greek culture and its uptake over time, as well as important representative evidence of human intellectual production. The NLG ensures equal access to these items based on the freedom of knowledge, information, and research. There is one Director General who serves a four-year term. A board of trustees has seven members with a three or four-year term.

Chrysa E. Nikolaou was appointed Director General in 2024. The previous Director General, Filippos Tsimpoglou, died after a brief illness in February 2023.

== History ==
The original idea for establishing a National Library was from the philhellene Johann Jakob Meyer, in an August 1824 article of his newspaper Ellinika Chronika, published at Missolonghi, where Mayer and Lord Byron had been promoting Greece's independence. Mayer's idea was implemented in 1829 by the new Greek government of Ioannis Kapodistrias, who grouped together the National Library with other intellectual institutions such as schools, national museums, and printing houses. These were all placed in a building (then being used as an orphanage) on the island Aegina and supervised by Andreas Moustoxydis, who thus became president of the committee of the Orphanage, director of the National Archaeological Museum of Athens, and director of the National School.

At the end of 1830, the library, which Moustoxydis named the National Library, had 1,018 volumes of printed books, which had been collected from Greeks and philhellenes. In 1834, the library was relocated to Athens, the new capital, and was at first housed temporarily in the public bath in the Roman Agora of Athens and then later in the Panagia Gorgoepikoos church.

The collection increased rapidly. In addition to the purchase of books from private libraries, supervised by Dimitris Postolakas (1,995 volumes), the library accepted many large donations of books, like one from Christoforos and Konstantinos Sakellarios (5,400 volumes) and one from Markos Renieris (3,401 volumes).

In 1842, the Public Library merged with Athens University's library (15,000 volumes), and was housed together with the currency collection at the new building of Otto's University. The first director (then-called "president") was Georgios Kozakis-Typaldos of the newly enlarged institution, retaining the job until 1863. At this time, the library was enriched with significant donations and with rare foreign language books from all over Europe. With the royal charter of 1866, the two libraries merged, and were administered as the "National Library of Greece". From 1877 to 1910, its director was Michael Deffner.

On 16 March 1888, the foundation stone for a new neoclassical marble building was laid. The building was financed by three Kefallonian-born brothers of the Diaspora, Panagis, Marinos and Andreas Vallianos. It was designed by Baron Theophil von Hansen and its construction was supervised by Ernst Ziller. The library remained in the older University building until 1903, when it was relocated to the new Vallianeion Megaron, which still partly houses the library in addition to two other buildings, at Agia Paraskevi and Nea Halkidona. The Vallianeion Megaron forms part of the Trilogy of neo-classical buildings at Panepistimiou Street in central Athens, including the Academy of Athens and the original building of the Athens University.

== Holdings ==
The National Library of Greece houses over 1.1 million items, 300 million electronic resources, and over 15,000 newspaper and magazine titles. The library has 5,500 Greek manuscripts which is one of the greatest collection of Greek scrips. There are also many chrysobulls and archives of the Greek Revolution.

Among the library's holdings are a codex of the four Gospels attributed to the scribe Matthew; uncial codex with a fragment Gospel of Matthew from 6th century (Uncial 094), Flora Graeca Sibthorpiana by English botanist John Sibthorp; Charta of Greece by Rigas Velestinlis; The Large Etymological Dictionary, a historic Byzantine dictionary; and the first publication of Homer's epics and hymns.

Some other manuscripts: Uncial 075, Uncial 0161, Minuscule 798.

The NLG also has over 4,000 works of art, approximately one million archival documents from public and private collections, 10,000 posters, maps, papyri, musical scores, and microfilms.

== Relocation to Phaleron Bay ==
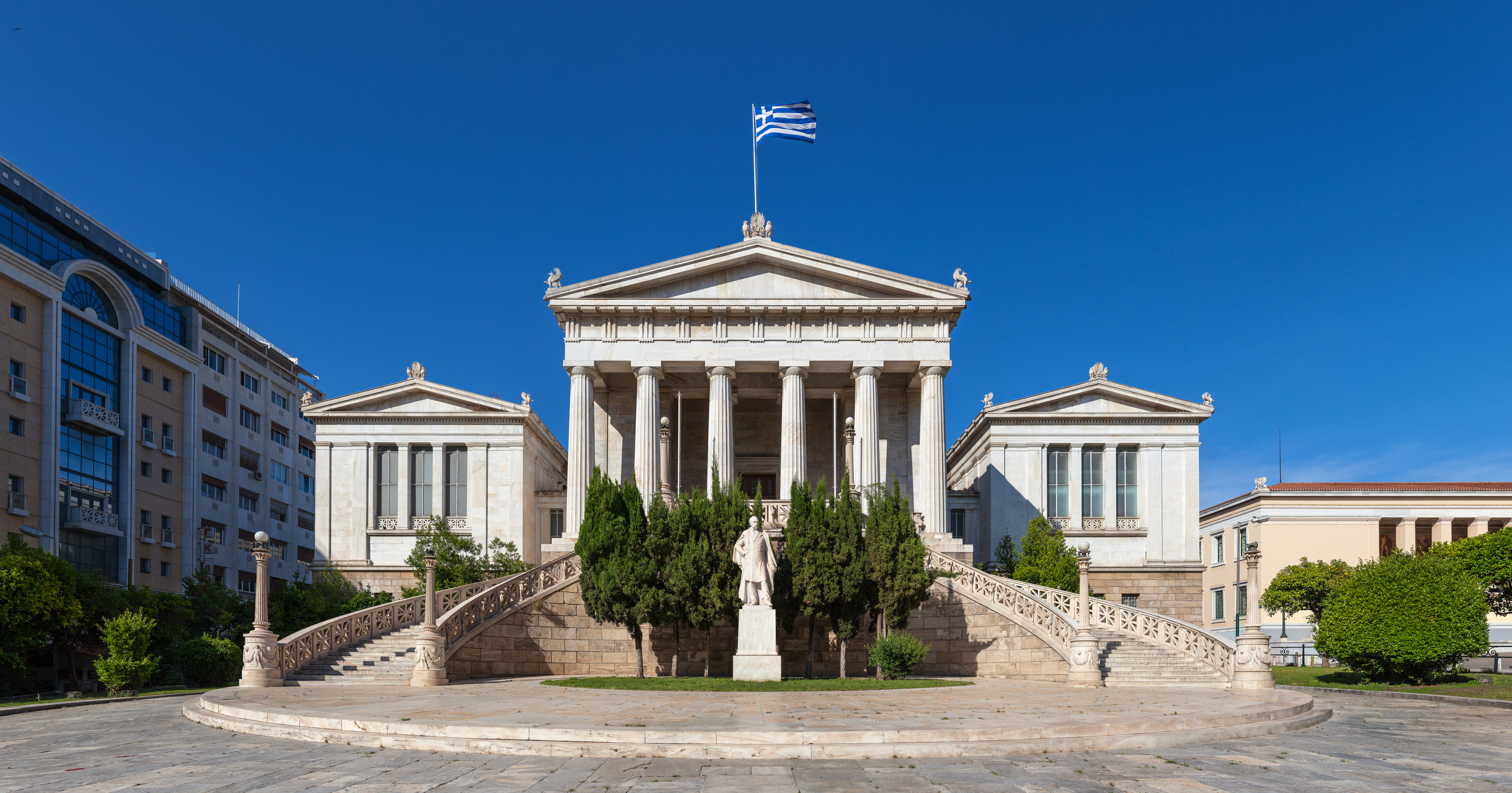
The Vallianeion Megaron, which housed the Library prior to 2017

The Vallianeion Megaron building has long been inconvenient due to limited space and technology demands. Although it will continue to house some of its current functions, the bulk of the library in 2018 was relocated to a new 22,000-square meter building at the Stavros Niarchos Foundation Cultural Center on the Phaleron Bay "Delta". The 20-hectare Delta is a seafront area that used to host the Athens horse race track, which was replaced by the Markopoulo Olympic Equestrian Centre for the Athens 2004 Olympics. Italian architect Renzo Piano proposed a radical new plan for the National Library and the National Opera of Greece, and the project was funded by the Stavros Niarchos Foundation and donated to the Greek state. The twin buildings are integrated within a landscaped park with indigenous Mediterranean flora, and feature extensive renewable energy facilities and a central plaza around a 30-m wide seawater channel. Work on the project started in 2012 with completion due for 2016.

== Library Associations ==
Greece has one national library association, the Association of Greek Librarians and Information Scientists (AGLIS). AGLIS was founded in 1968 and represents Greek librarians to the International Federation of Library Associations and Institutions (IFLA). AGLIS is also a member of The European Bureau of Library, Information and Documentation Associations (EBLIDA). in Spring 2021, AGLIS partnered with the Heritage Management Organization (HMO) to enhance its ability to meet the needs of Greek Libraries and their patrons.

== Locations ==
Main Location:

Stavros Niarchos Foundataion Cultural Center

Syggrou Avenue 364, 17674, Kallithea

Historic Vallianeio Building

Panepistimiou Str. 32, 10679, Athens (former NLG headquarters, now hosting NLG's Newspapers Collection)

Votanikos Building

Athinon Avenue 31-33 and Spirou Patsi Str. 12,10447, Athens

== See also ==
- List of national libraries
- List of libraries in Greece

== Sources ==
- Brock, Sebastian P. (1966). "The Syriac Manuscripts in the National Library, Athens". Le Muséon. 79: 165–185.
