= Adrianou Street =

Road in Athens

Hadrian Street
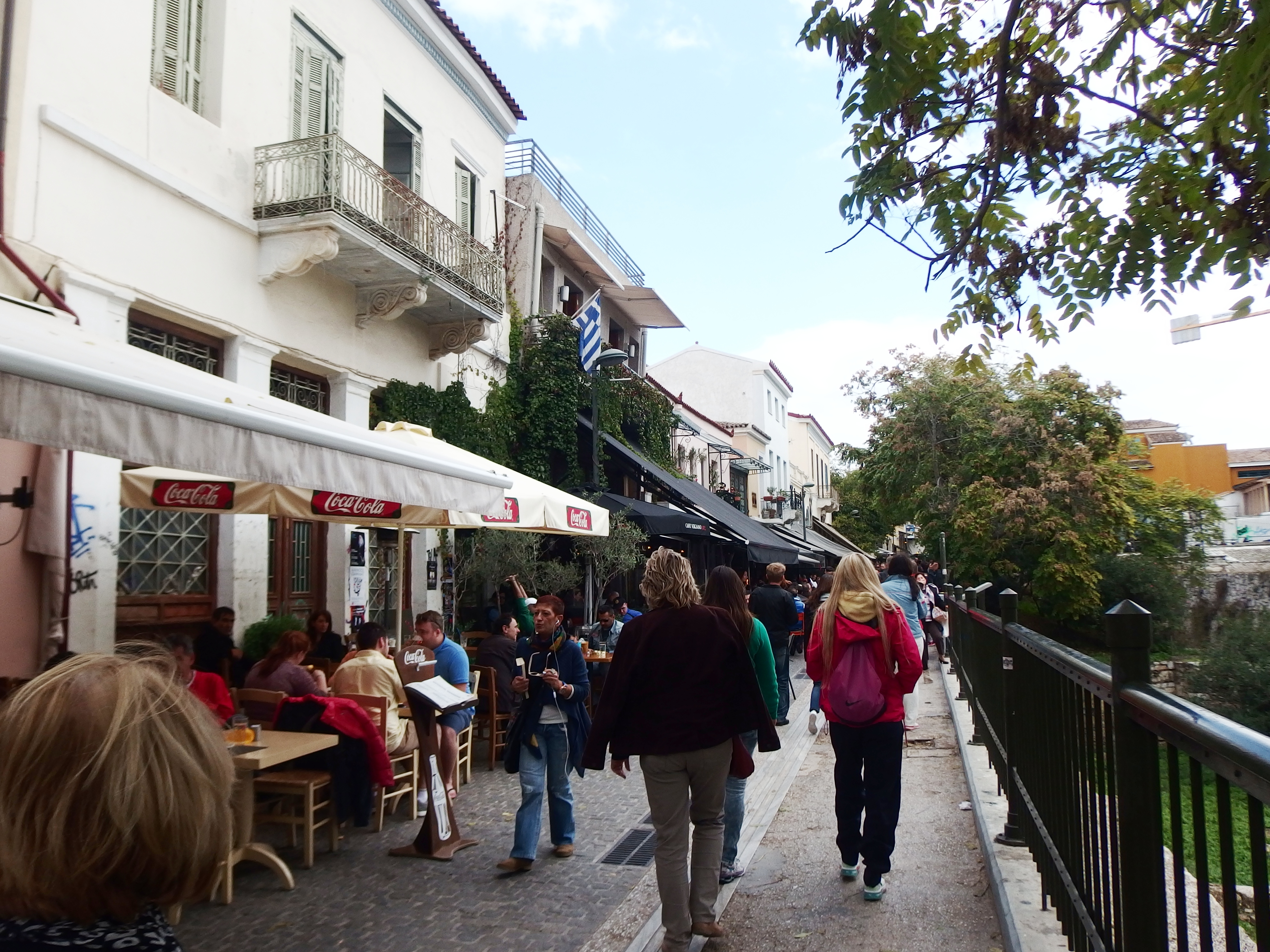

Route information
- Maintained by Municipality of Athens
- Existed: 19th century–present

Major junctions
- From: Agion Asomaton Street
- To: Chairefontos Street

Hadrian Street is a road in the Thiseio neighborhood of the Municipality of Athens, Greece. It extends from Thiseio Square to Chairefontos Street. It was named in honor of the Philhellene Roman Emperor Hadrian. Hadrian Street divides the two sub-areas of Plaka, Upper and Lower Plaka, with the former extending between the street and the Acropolis, while Lower Plaka develops towards Syntagma Square. It is part of the protected area of Plaka.

== History ==
During the Frankokratia and Ottoman periods, it was known as "Ruga tis Chrysaliotissas" due to the small church of the same name that stood on the street. During the Ottoman period, there was a flour mill opposite the market, which was later demolished.

It was the first street to be paved in 1835.

In the early post-revolutionary years, it was considered the most important, commercial, and bustling street, housing significant buildings such as the Ministries of Military and Navy, the Embassies of Russia, Britain, Turkey, and Spain, renowned hotels such as "Vasilikon," "Gallia," and "Monachon," as well as mansions and residences of foreign inhabitants of the city.

Hadrian Street was the site of many street battles between "Mountain" and "Plain" factions during the "June Events" of 1863, resulting in significant damage to many houses.

Today, the western section of Hadrian Street has been pedestrianized from its intersection with Areos Street to Thiseio. It has the highest number of preserved buildings (56). The ground floors host specialized commerce, while the upper floors are used for entertainment and residential purposes.

== Notable buildings ==
- Stoa of Attalos (Hadrian Street 24)
- Church of Saint Philip (Hadrian Street 19)
- Benizelos Mansion (Hadrian Street 96). The oldest house in the capital. A preserved building, a typical example of urban architecture of pre-revolutionary Athens (15th-16th century). It was the ancestral home of Saint Philothei of Athens.
- Kampanis School (Hadrian Street 106-108 and Flessa). A Neoclassical building from the 1870s designed by architect Panagis Kalkos. Now houses the 74th Primary School of Athens.
- King Residence (Hadrian and Hill Streets). Residence of the American missionary T. King (1792–1869) designed by St. Kleanthis.
- The Center for Educational Research is located at Hadrian Street 91.

== Notable residents of Hadrian Street ==
- Georgios Drosinis, writer. The house where the poet was born was at Hadrian & Thespis Street.
- George Finlay, historian. His residence for many years was at Hadrian and Hill Streets.
- Georgios Rizaris, national benefactor. His residence was at Hadrian Street and Angelou Vlachou Street.
