= Stavros Niarchos Foundation Cultural Center =

Cultural center in Athens

Coordinates: 37°56′23″N 23°41′30″E

Stavros Niarchos Foundation Cultural Center Κέντρο Πολιτισμού Ίδρυμα Σταύρος Νιάρχος

- Interactive map of the Stavros Niarchos Foundation Cultural Center; Κέντρο Πολιτισμού Ίδρυμα Σταύρος Νιάρχος area

General information
- Type: Cultural Center
- Location: Kallithea, Athens, Greece
- Completed: 2016
- Owner: Hellenic Republic (Greek State)

Design and construction
- Architect: Renzo Piano
- Architecture firm: Renzo Piano Building Workshop

Other information
- Public transit access: SNFCC metro station (planned)

Website
- www.snfcc.org/en

The Stavros Niarchos Foundation Cultural Center (SNFCC) (Greek: Κέντρο Πολιτισμού Ίδρυμα Σταύρος Νιάρχος, romanized: Kéntro Politismoú Ídryma Staúros Niárchos (ΚΠΙΣΝ)) is a cultural center complex in the municipality of Kallithea in Athens, Greece. It includes new facilities for the National Library of Greece (NLG) and the Greek National Opera (GNO), as well as the 210,000 m^{2} (2,300,000 sq ft) Stavros Niarchos Park. The center was designed by architect Renzo Piano and its construction was funded by the Stavros Niarchos Foundation. The $861 million project was completed in 2016, and was donated to the Greek state in 2017.

== Project ==
Plans for a big scale donation by the Stavros Niarchos Foundation started in 1998. Initially the foundation planned to make separate donations to the National Library and the National Opera. In 2006 it was decided to build one complex for both organizations and after discussions with the Greek state the area of the former horse racing (Hippodrome) track was chosen. In 2008 the foundation chose Italian architect Renzo Piano to design the complex and in 2012 construction works started.

== Building ==
Renzo Piano envisaged the SNFCC rising out of the ground like a dislodged piece of the Earth's crust. As a result, an artificial hill is constructed and the roof of both the library and the opera house is emerging from it maintaining the slope. The library is lower and the ‘hill’ concludes with the opera house. The roof of the library will be covered with ground material and planted with indigenous Greek plants. On top of the opera house there will be a canopy supported on thin steel columns. According to Piano, "the canopy represents a cloud hovering over the highest point of the hill". The roof of the building is covered with a 100x100 meter photovoltaic field, generating around 3 GWh per year. The roof is suspended with dampers to increase its resilience during hurricanes.

The design for the National Opera includes a 1,400-seat opera auditorium and a 400-seat black box theatre.

The SNFCC was nominated for the international prize for architecture, RIBA International Prize 2018, awarded by the Royal Institute of British Architects. It is the only Greek nominee among 62 buildings in 30 countries.

== Governance ==
The SNFCC's board of directors is elected and its members are appointed by the Greek State. It consists of the Chairman, the Managing Director, the Mayor of Kallithea who is ex officio member and three more members two of which are appointed based on the recommendation by the Greek National Opera and the National Library of Greece.

In 2025 the SNFCC announced the formation of an Advisory Council.

Chairmans

- Giorgos Kimoulis (2017)
- Nikos Manolopoulos (2017–2018)
- Lydia Koniordou (2019)
- Elly Andriopoulou (2020–2022)
- Stathis Kalyvas (2023–present)

Managing Directors

- Nikos Manolopoulos (2017–2020)
- Elly Andriopoulou (2020–present)

== Other information ==
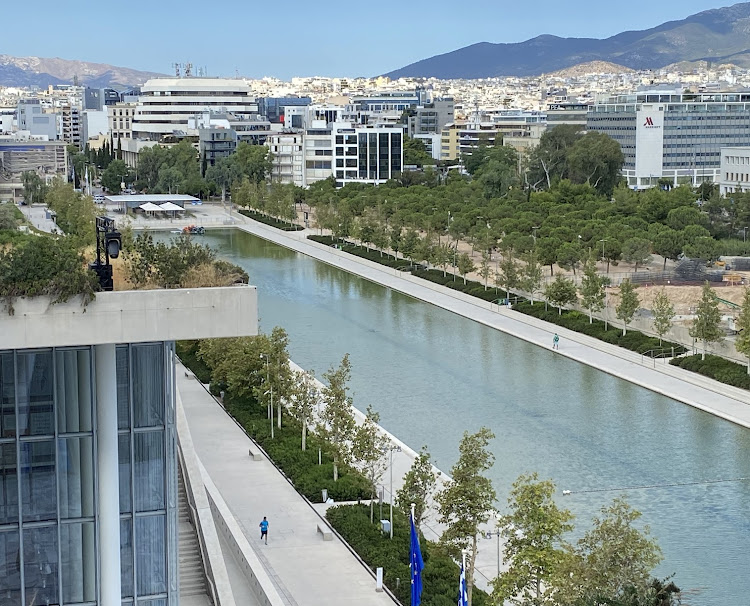
The canal of SNFCC

During his visit to Athens, Greece (November 15–16, 2016), the former US President Barack Obama gave a speech at the Stavros Niarchos Foundation Cultural Center (SNFCC), covering the impact of democracy.

Plans for the Athens Metro to reach Stavros Niarchos Foundation Cultural Center (SNFCC) were announced in 2021.

The Faliro Delta, located on the waterfront side of the SNFCC, is currently being renovated into a waterfront park to be named Aenaon with a scheduled completion of 2028.
