= Greek National Opera =

Opera and ballet organization

- Native name: Εθνική Λυρική Σκηνή
- Industry: Opera
- Founded: December 13, 1939; 86 years ago
- Headquarters: Kallithea, Athens, Greece
- Website: www.nationalopera.gr

The Greek National Opera (Greek: Εθνική Λυρική Σκηνή, Ethniki Lyriki Skini) is the country's state lyric opera company, located in the Stavros Niarchos Foundation Cultural Center at the south suburb of Athens, Kallithea. It is a public corporation under the supervision of the Greek Ministry of Culture and administered by the Board of Trustees and its Artistic Director, currently George Koumedakis.

The organization is responsible for a wide variety of activities, including the presentation of opera performances, ballet, and musical theatre; in addition, symphony concerts, special presentations of opera and ballet performances for children, and the Opera and Ballet Studio help young artists achieve professional standards.

The GNO has created and now organizes a national archive of music, a music library, a costume museum, stage models, musical scores and many items from great performances presented by the company. The company tours both within Greece and internationally.

== Performance venues ==
The performances of the Greek National Opera are presented on three stages:

- The Stavros Niarchos Hall is the main location for opera and ballet.
- The Alternative Stage which presents musicals and alternative productions.
- The Odeon of Herodes Atticus is the summer venue for the opera productions with the collaboration of the Athens Festival.

Recently, the Stavros Niarchos Foundation has funded the construction of the Stavros Niarchos Foundation Cultural Center, a new venue since December 2016 for the Greek National Opera, the Greek National Library and a cultural and environmental park at the Faliron area in southeast section of Athens. The new 28,000 m² (301,000 sq. ft.) auditorium is an architectural jewel, designed to enhance the opera experience for patrons and artists alike.

== History ==
During the late 1880s, the first Greek Opera was presented at the old Theatre in Athens (then Royal Theatre, now National Theatre of Greece). Between 1888 and 1890 the Greek Opera toured regions with then substantial Greek diaspora populations such as Egypt, Turkey and Romania, presenting operas such as Mozart’s The Abduction from the Seraglio, Donizetti’s La favorite and Lucia di Lammermoor and Bellini’s La sonnambula.

After 1924, following its tour of the United States and establishment as a significant cultural institution at home and abroad, the Greek government recognized the company’s effort by providing support. It was in 1939 that the Greek National Opera was formally established under the management of Kostis Bastias, and from 1944 the company operated as an autonomous organization in its present form.

=== First opera performances of the Greek National Opera ===
On 5 March 1940 the company had its first official opening with the Johann Strauss operetta, Die Fledermaus. Two days prior to the declaration of the Second World War, the company presented Puccini’s Madama Butterfly in the presence of Puccini’s son.

Foremost among the many singers to take part in performances for the National Opera and later successfully establish reputations abroad is Maria Callas, the greatest of the country's opera performers and a leading singer of the century. Born in the United States, she signed her first professional contract with the Greek National Opera on 20 June 1940, and returned twenty years later, with Kostas Bastias once again, for performances at the Ancient Theatre of Epidaurus. In 1960, she sang Norma in the Bellini opera, and in 1961 took the role of Medea in Cherubini’s Medea. Other important singers have included Elena Souliotis, Kostas Paskalis, Nicola Zaccaria, and Agnes Baltsa.

=== The GNO at the Athens Epidaurus Festival ===
Since 1955, when the Athens Epidaurus Festival first began, the Greek National opera has presented special performances for the ancient Roman-era amphitheatre, the Odeon of Herodes Atticus; its first presentation was Gluck’s Orfeo ed Euridice, and in conjunction with the Greek opera company a number of famous international performers of all types have performed at the festival down the decades. In its early years, helping to establish the Festival as a major international event were conductors Tullio Serafin and Nicola Rescigno, singers such as Ghena Dimitrova, Maria Chiara, Giuseppe Taddei, and Rolando Panerai, and well-known directors and set designers such as Giancarlo Menotti, Dinos Giannopoulos, Spyros Evangelatos, Nikos Georgiadis, Dionyssios Fotopoulos, and Nikos Petropoulos. Recent Festival productions at the Herodion Ancient Theatre have included many of the standard operatic works, with Kostas Paskalis featuring in major roles.

=== Ballet and Chorus ===
The Chorus of the Greek National Opera, in existence since 1939, is composed of professional singers. In addition to the major operatic works, its repertory covers a broad range of Greek composers, operettas, oratorios and many religious musical works, also taking in the 20th century classical repertoire.

Its first "Ballet Evening" was presented in 1960; this is aside from its participation in operas and operettas, so the company prepares several evenings of ballet each winter season and performs at the Athens Festival each summer. In addition to the standard classic and romantic repertory, contemporary dance by Greek and foreign professionals is established as a feature. With help from the state, the Ballet has acquired its own fuller rehearsal studio for training purposes and consequently has improved its artistic standard. Particularly important in her contribution to the development of ballet at the National Opera was Tatiana Mamaki.

=== Greek Youth Symphony Orchestra ===
In 2017, the Greek Youth Symphony Orchestra was established at the Greek National Opera.

== See also ==
- Athens Concert Hall
