= Voukourestiou Street =

Street in Athens, Greece

Coordinates: 37°58′36.70″N 23°44′5.86″E

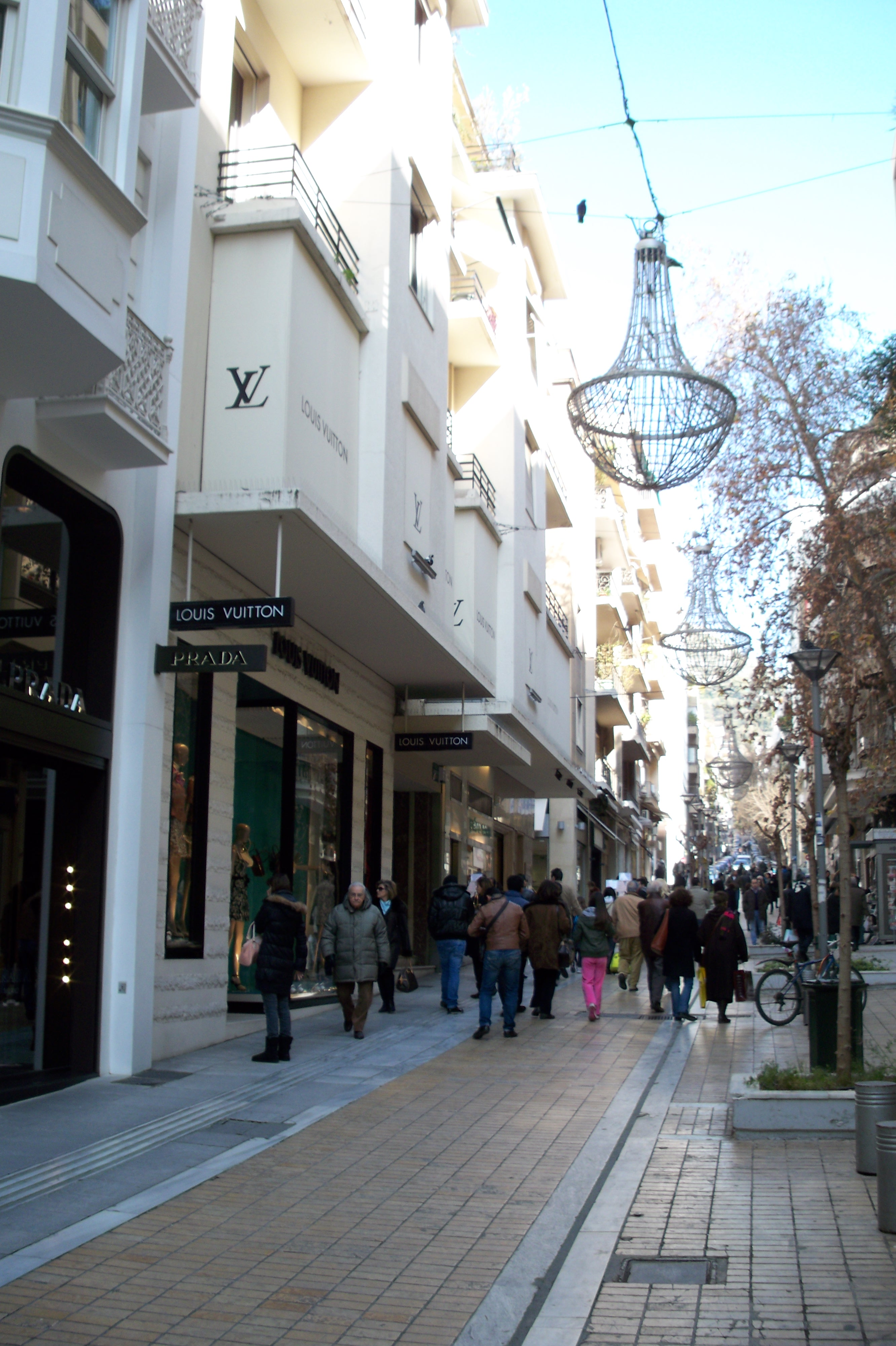
Voukourestiou Street.

Voukourestiou Street (Greek: Οδός Βουκουρεστίου, Odos Voukourestiou) named after the 1913 Treaty of Bucharest, which ended the Second Balkan War, is a rather narrow street in the Kolonaki district of Athens known for its high-end boutiques. In the 1950s, the street became popular for hip and trendy European and American goods in the Greek capital as well as gold and jewellery shops. Running from Stadiou Street to the slope of Mount Lycabettus, the street epitomized fancy shopping in Greece for generations.

Voukourestiou Street is one of the four streets (the others being Stadiou Street, Amerikis Street and Panepistimiou Street) which enclose the large building of the former Army Shareholders' Fund. Now the building houses the Attica Department Store and the headquarters of the Piraeus Bank. Among others, there are a spa, three theatres and three cafés and restaurants, one of which is the well-known café Zonars. The building is crossed by an arcade which connects Voukourestiou and Amerikis Streets. This block—recently known as Athens City Link—houses the majority of the high-end boutiques in central Athens.
