= Panepistimiou Street =

Street in Athens, Greece

Coordinates: 37°58′48.96″N 23°43′58.38″E

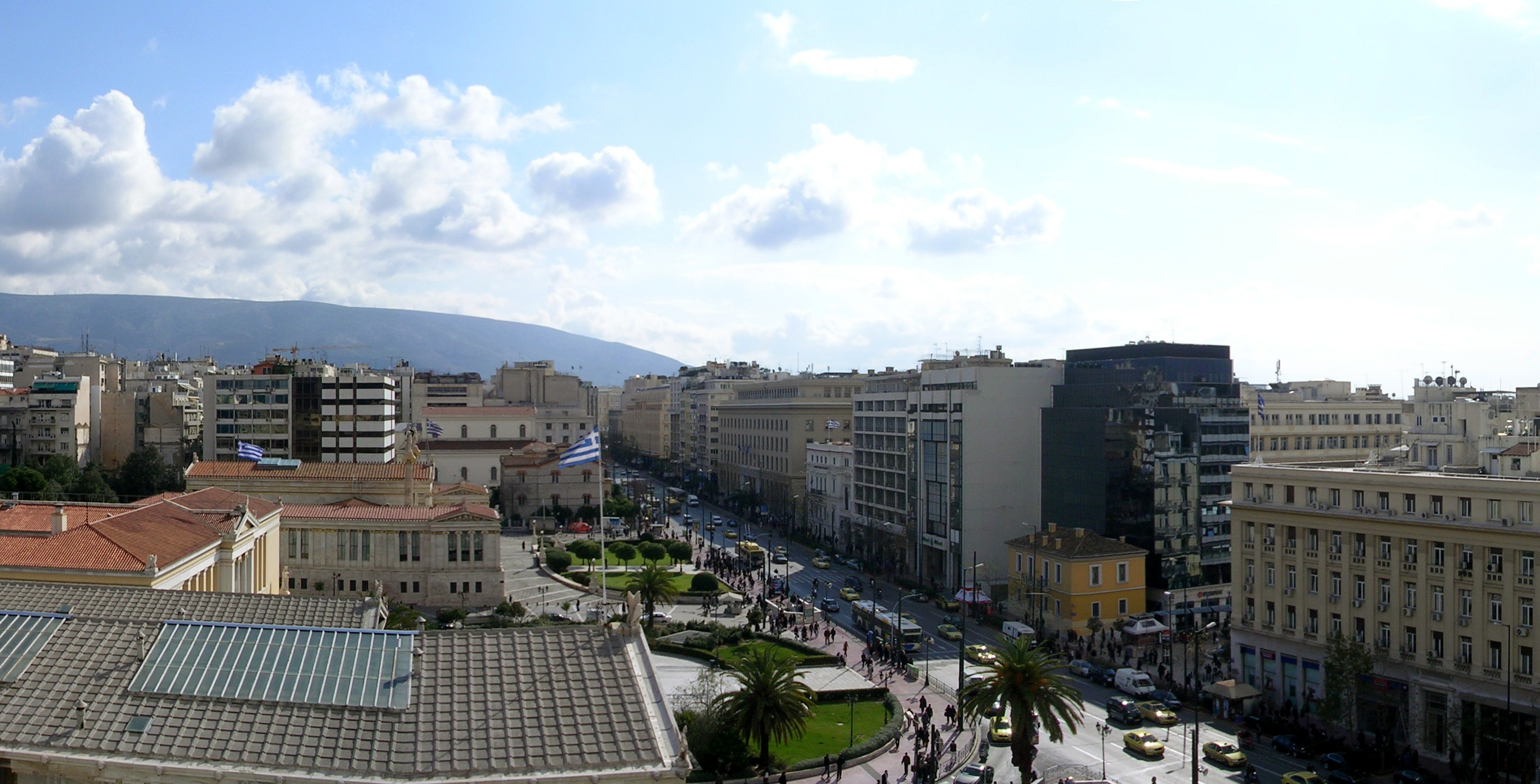
Panepistimiou street facing towards Syntagma square. On the left the Propylaea and the main building of the Academy of Athens.

Panepistimiou Street (Greek: Οδός Πανεπιστημίου, "University Street", named after the University of Athens, the central building of which is on the upper corner) is a major street in Athens that has run one way for non-transit vehicles since 2002 from Vasilissis Amalias Avenue, Syntagma Square and Vassilissis Sofias Avenue to Omonoia Square in which is now a pedestrian crossing and before an intersection. Its total length is about 1.2 km. The street was formally renamed as Eleftherios Venizelos Avenue in 1945 (after the famous Prime Minister) but is still usually known by its historical name. It has six lanes, of which five are for traffic and one eastbound lane for transit buses only. Most of the street runs almost diagonally from southeast to northwest.

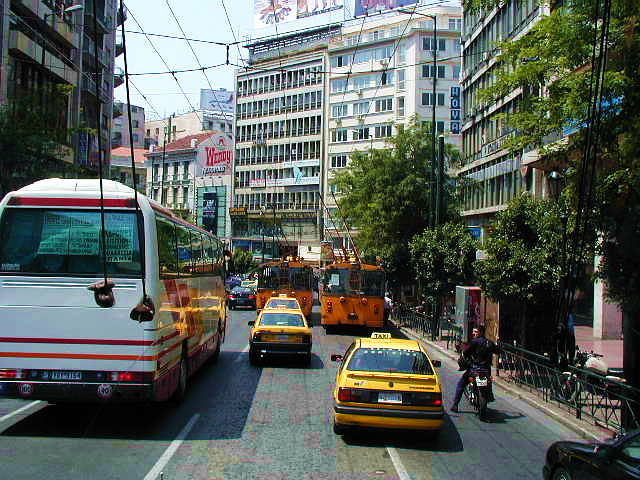
View of the street (during the 1990s)

Buildings along the street include the Bank of Greece, Athens Eye Clinic, the University of Athens, the Academy of Athens, the National Library, the Numismatic Museum, Titania Hotel, Attica Department Store, as well as a part of the Grande Bretagne Hotel and the Catholic Cathedral of Athens. Many buildings as high as ten to fifteen stories line this street. Old neoclassical buildings of no higher than two to three stories used to exist until the 1950s, when a construction spree, which lasted several decades, demolished all but a few of them.

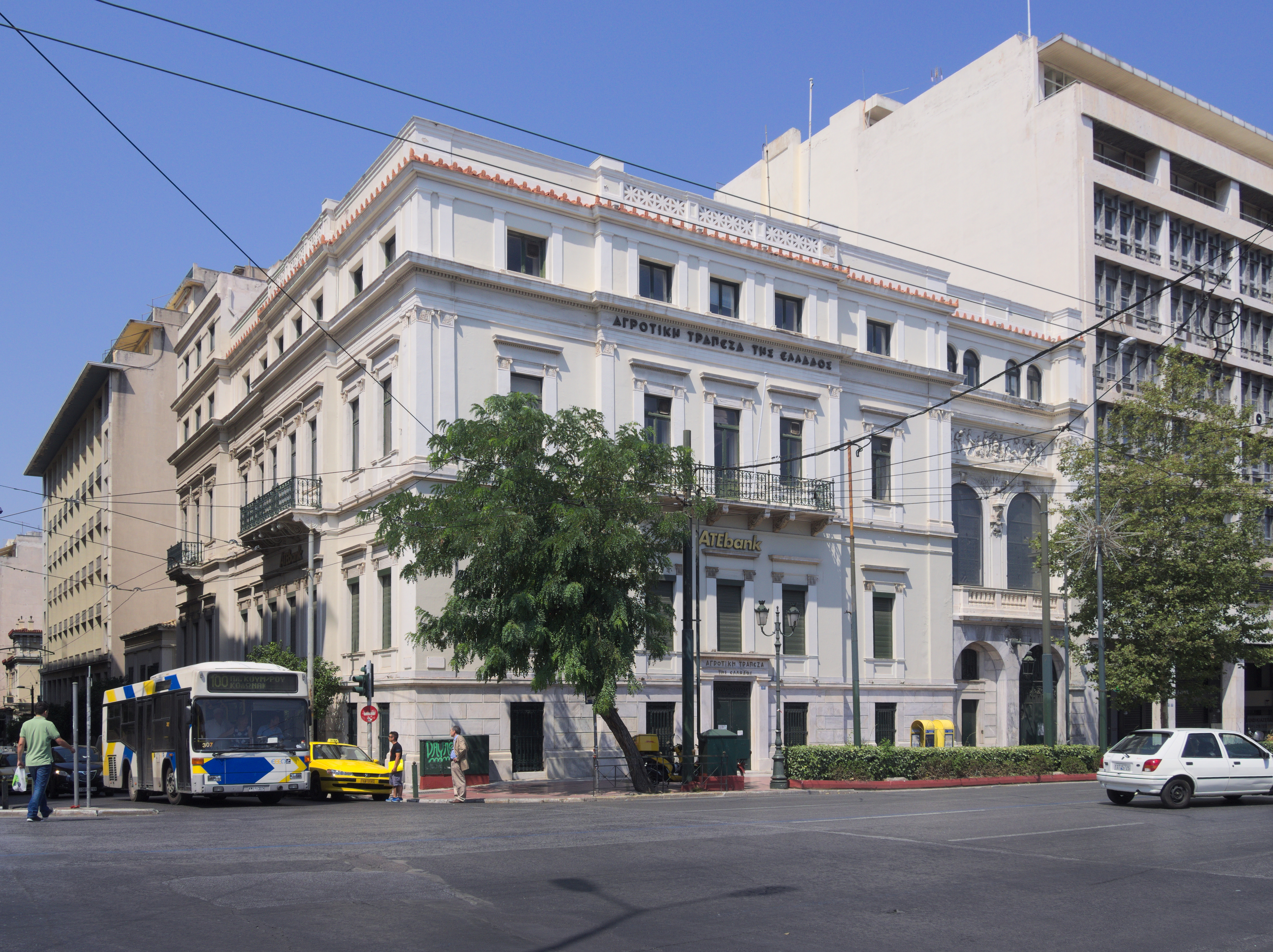
The old Serpieri mansion on the street

== History ==
Originally a two-way street until after the Greek Civil War with bus lanes, traffic lights on major intersections as well as street lights were installed in the 1950s. Several classic films were shot in this street. The Athens Metro Line 2 runs underneath with stations linking with this street including the Panepistimiou station. During construction which lasted from 1997 to 2001, part of the underground soil was removed to make the underground subway system, causing a hole of 22 m below and a sinking of the street of about 4 m. Workers filled the hole with concrete so that traffic can resume. In the 2000s, the transit buses which can run eastbound can now run two way and is at the lower end of the street.

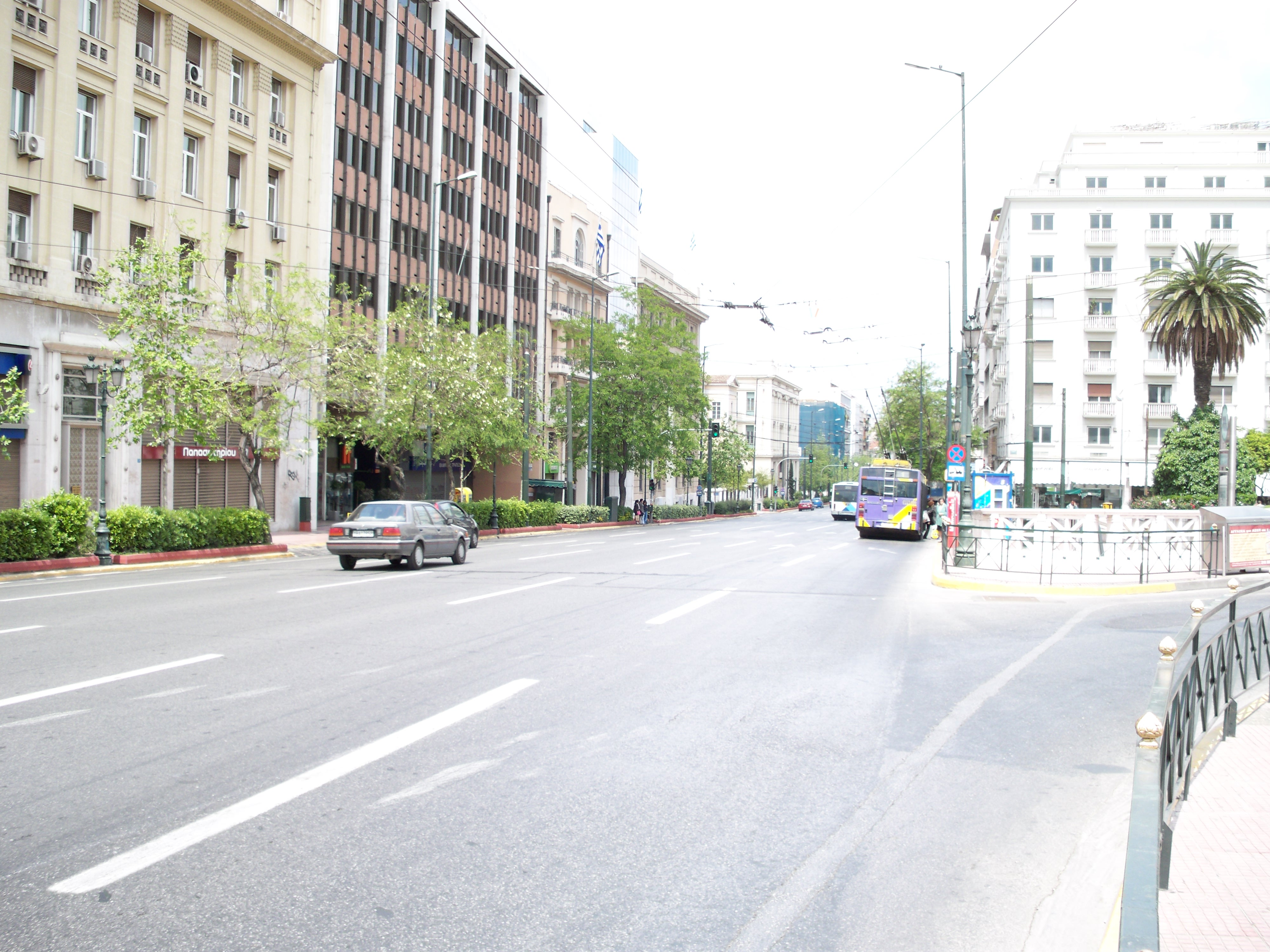
Panepistimiou street facing towards Omonoia square

== Intersections ==
- Kriezotou Street
- Voukourestiou Street
- Amerikis Street
- Omirou Street (major)
- Eduardo Lo and Sina Streets
- Korai Street
- Ippokratous Street (one way westbound)
- Pesmatzoglou Street
- Charilaou Trikoupi Street
- Santarosa Street
- Emmanouil Benaki Street
- Themistokleous Street
- Aiolou and Patission (formal name: 28 Oktovriou Street) Streets

== Future plans for the street ==
Plans are being made for transforming the street into a pedestrian zone, a place more cultural, cosmopolitan and leisure-related. The idea is part of a project held by the Onassis Foundation under the name "Rethink Athens" in an effort for a more allure and delightful Athens. The project is scheduled to be completed in the next few years. Scholars are critical of the political implications of the project. Furthermore, there are fears that this will create a "dead zone" in Panepistimou, which, as it is a long, wide road that people make a conscious decision to go to and not a square that people naturally congregate at, will only attract low-level "leisure activities" (cafes, bars) but will lead to the decline of all other activities that might be expected in a modern European capital city (retail, services, offices, presence of companies of various kinds, finance, hotels, cinemas, theatres). This will especially be the case further down from the corner with Syntagma Square. Traffic congestion will also increase in all surrounding roads as it will be diverted from Panepistimiou, which will also be closed to buses (there will only be a tramline, which has not been built yet and which will only have limited coverage, thus making it even more difficult for people to get to Panepistimiou, speeding up its rapid decline).
