= Venues of the 2004 Summer Olympics =

Facilities of the 2004 Summer Olympics in the Greater Athens area. Navigate the map for other facilities.

For the 2004 Summer Olympics, a total of thirty-five sports venues were used. Athens hosted the first modern Olympic Games in 1896, which used venues such as Panathinaiko Stadium and the city of Marathon for which the long-distance race would be named. From the end of the 1896 Games until the late 1970s, Greece underwent numerous political changes that included the Balkan Wars, two World Wars, a civil war, and a military coup that resulted in a junta that lasted from 1967 to 1974. A change in democracy in 1975 resulted in Greece's admission into the European Economic Community in 1979.

Athens first bid for the 1996 Summer Olympics as part of the 100th anniversary of the Modern Olympics, but was upset by Atlanta, Georgia, in the United States for the Games in 1990. Seven years later, Athens won the right to host the 2004 Summer Olympics. At the time of the awarding, 75% of competition and 92% of training venues were available though a massive construction, and a renovation program was taken to get the venues ready for the games. Accessibility and environmental issues were taken into account in venue design and construction. The marathon course used was the same one used for the 1896 Games, though it was 2.195 km (1.36 mi) longer due to the marathon not being standardized until 1924. Canoe slalom's venue at Ellinikon was the first using saltwater, having it pumped in from the Aegean Sea. After the Olympics, the Markopoulo Olympic Shooting Centre was converted into a police training center, while two other venues were converted into entertainment centers.

== Venues ==
=== Athens Olympic Sports Complex ===
Venue	Image	Sports	Capacity	Type	Ref.
Athens Olympic Aquatic Centre		Diving, Swimming, Synchronized swimming, Water polo	11,500 (Main Pool) 6,200 (Indoor Pool) 5,300 (Synchronised Swimming Pool)	Renovated	
Athens Olympic Tennis Centre		Tennis	8,600 (Main Court) 2x4,300 (Semi-Final Courts) 13x200 (Side Courts)	New	
Athens Olympic Velodrome		Cycling (track)	5,250	Renovated	
Nikos Galis Olympic Indoor Hall		Basketball (final), Gymnastics (artistic, trampolining)	19,250	Renovated	
Olympic Stadium		Ceremonies (opening/ closing), Athletics, Football (final)	72,000	Renovated	

=== Helliniko Olympic Complex ===
Venue	Image	Sports	Capacity	Type	Ref.
Fencing Hall		Fencing	5,000	New	
Helliniko Indoor Arena		Basketball, Handball (final)	14,100	New	
Olympic Baseball Centre		Baseball	8,700 (Field 1) 4,000 (Field 2)	New	
Olympic Canoe/Kayak Slalom Centre		Canoeing (slalom)	7,600	New	
Olympic Hockey Centre		Field hockey	7,300 (Pitch 1) 2,100 (Pitch 2)	New	
Olympic Softball Stadium		Softball	4,800	New	

=== Faliro Coastal Zone Olympic Complex ===
Venue	Image	Sports	Capacity	Type	Ref.
Karaiskakis Stadium		Football	33,000	Renovated	
Faliro Olympic Beach Volleyball Centre		Volleyball (beach)	9,600	New	
Faliro Sports Pavilion Arena		Handball, Taekwondo	8,100	New	
Peace and Friendship Stadium		Volleyball (indoor)	13,200	Renovated	

=== Goudi Olympic Complex ===
Venue	Image	Sports	Capacity	Type	Ref.
Goudi Olympic Hall		Badminton	4,100	New	
Olympic Modern Pentathlon Centre		Modern pentathlon	5,000 (Equestrian) 3,000 (Shooting, Fencing) 2,500 (Swimming)	New	

=== Markopoulo Olympic Complex ===
Venue	Image	Sports	Capacity	Type	Ref.
Markopoulo Olympic Equestrian Centre		Equestrian	15,000 (Cross-Country course) 10,000 (Jumping arena) 8,100 (Dressage arena)	New	
Markopoulo Olympic Shooting Centre		Shooting	4,000	New	

=== Football venues ===
Venue	Image	Sports	Capacity	Type	Ref.
Kaftanzoglio Stadium (Thessaloniki)		Football	28,200	Renovated	
Pampeloponnisiako Stadium (Patras)		Football	21,000	Renovated	
Pankritio Stadium (Heraklion)		Football	26,400	New	
Panthessaliko Stadium (Volos)		Football	22,700	New	

=== Other venues ===
Venue	Image	Sports	Capacity	Type	Ref.
Agios Kosmas Olympic Sailing Centre		Sailing	1,600	New	
Ano Liosia Olympic Hall		Judo, Wrestling	9,000	New	
Galatsi Olympic Hall		Gymnastics (rhythmic), Table tennis	6,500	New	
Kotzia Square		Cycling (individual road race)	3,600	Temporary	
Marathon (city)		Athletics (marathon start)	Not listed.	Temporary	
Nikaia Olympic Weightlifting Hall		Weightlifting	5,100	New	
Panathenaic Stadium		Archery, Athletics (marathon finish)	34,500 (Marathon) 7,500 (archery)	Existing	
Parnitha Olympic Mountain Bike Venue		Cycling (mountain biking)	15,500	Temporary	
Peristeri Olympic Boxing Hall		Boxing	8,000	New	
Schinias Olympic Rowing and Canoeing Centre		Canoeing (sprint), Rowing	14,000	New	
Stadium at Olympia		Athletics (shot put)	Not listed.	Temporary	
Vouliagmeni Olympic Centre		Cycling (individual time trial), Triathlon	3,600	Temporary	

== Before the Olympics ==
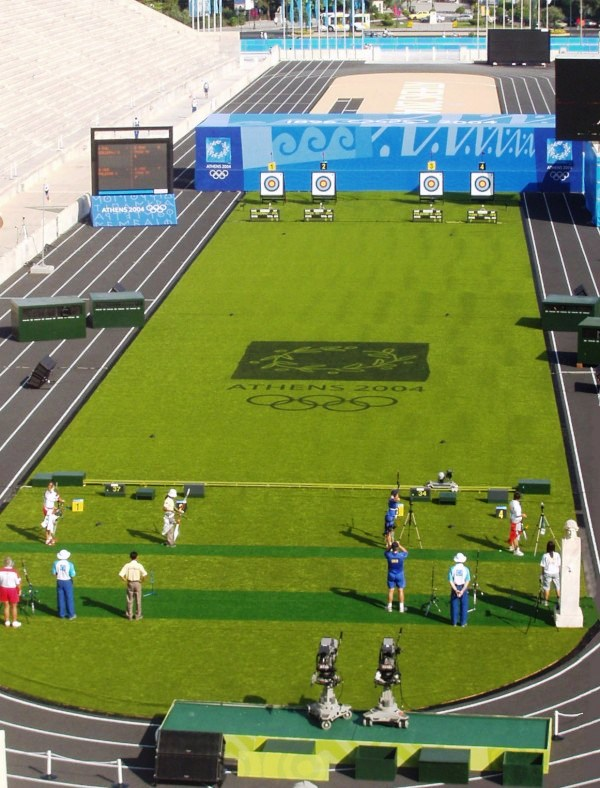
Archery matches at the Panathinaiko Stadium during the 2004 Olympics. The stadium also served as the finish line for the athletics marathon events.

Greece served as home of the Ancient Olympic Games that ran from 776 B.C. to 393 A.D. in Olympia. Following the effort of Pierre de Coubertin to revive the Olympic Games, the first modern Olympics took place at Athens in 1896. The Panathinaiko served as host of the athletic, gymnastic, weightlifting, and wrestling events. The city of Marathon served the start point for the sport of the same name and the starting and finishing point of cycling's Individual road race.

Between the 1896 and 2004 Summer Olympics, Greece underwent a series of events that created political instability in the country. This included the Balkan Wars of 1912-13, World War I, the Greco-Turkish War of 1919-22, the creation of a Second Hellenic Republic, the Axis Occupation of Greece during World War II, and the Greek Civil War of 1946-49. By the 1950s, Greece reemerged as an "economic model", though a coup d'état in April 1967 forced the country into a military junta that lasted until 1974. It would take a change back to democracy in 1975 and an entrance into the European Economic Community in 1979 to set Greece back to growth.

Athens first bid for the Summer Olympics took place in 1986 for the 1996 Olympics, losing to eventual winner Atlanta, Georgia, in the United States at a 1990 International Olympic Committee (IOC) meeting in Tokyo. The Olympic Stadium in Athens served as host for the European Athletics Championships in 1982. This venue also served as host for the Mediterranean Games in 1991. In 1995, Athens submitted a bid for the 2004 Summer Olympics which it was awarded in September 1997. A month earlier, Olympic Stadium hosted the World Championships in Athletics.

At the time of the bid in 1997, the venues to be used for the 2004 Games were available for 75% of the competition and 92% of the training locations. Venue locations were settled between 1998 and 2003. Construction funding started in 1998, with laws passing in 1999 and 2000 to assist this along. A total of 37 contracts were issued for venue construction and renovation involving three different governmental ministries. Monthly reports were issued to the Athens Organizing Committee (ATHOC) on venue project status, including the use of Gantt charts. Design drawings were completed by December 2002. Accessibility needs for the venues were taken into consideration into their design and construction. ATHOC hired consultants to review the venue design for accessibility. Among the needs considered are keeping corridors flat and free of obstacles, ramps and platforms longer than 10 m (33 ft) with a 5% incline, and larger elevators installed for all personnel involved with the 2004 Games.

The Schinias Olympic Rowing and Canoeing Centre had to deal with the World Wildlife Fund and three Greek environmental organizations during the construction phase. The biotope area where the venue would be constructed was declared a National Park in June 2000. Water quality was monitored once the venue was completed in 2003, with monitoring occurring from July to September 2003 and June to September 2004. Among the items monitored were temperature, salinity, biological oxygen demand (BOD), chemical oxygen demand (COD), total bacteria, and residual bacteria. The water quality monitoring guidelines were done in cooperation with the International Rowing Federation (FISA).

Insect control at the venues had biological products used for pesticides sprayed with extreme precisions. A total of 70 man-months were required to sample, spray, and bait the 20,000 samples and 4,000 mosquito breeding sites. Maritime pollution, specifically with oil spills, had to be dealt with for Agios Kosmas (sailing) and Vouliameni (triathlon) in case a spill occurred. Recycling was used at all venues for the 2004 Games.

Prior to its use as a football stadium, the Karaiskakis Stadium had been a velodrome that hosted the track cycling competition of the 1896 Olympics.

Panathinaiko Stadium hosted the modern Olympics-predecessor Zappas Olympics in 1870 and in 1875. The stadium hosted the athletics and ceremonies of the 1896 Olympics and the 1906 Intercalated Games. In the 2004 Olympic Games, the venue hosted archery and served as the marathon finish line.

== During the Olympics ==
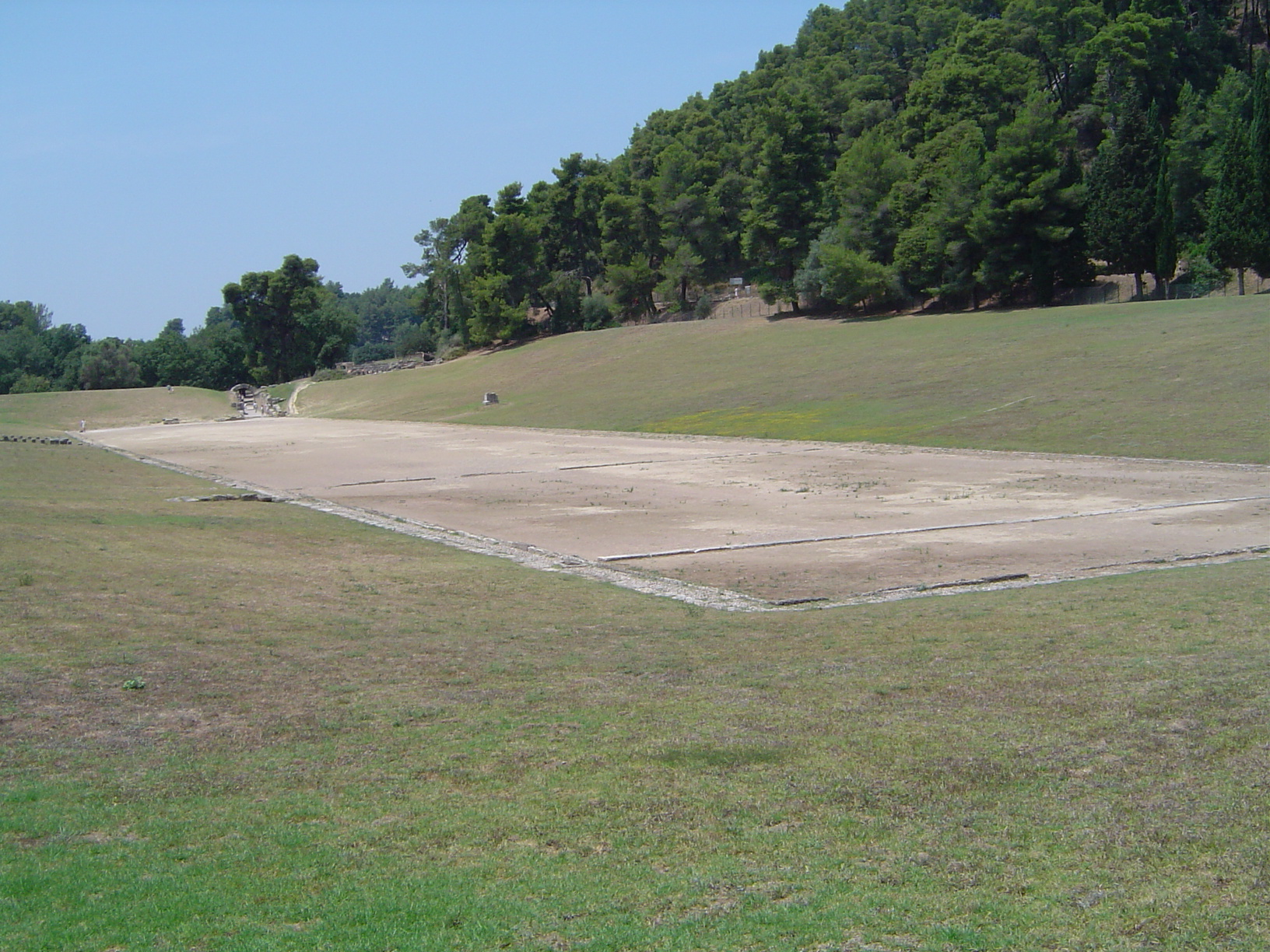
The Stadium at Olympia track (pictured in 2006) host the athletics and shot put events for the 2004 Summer Olympics in neighboring Athens.

The 2004 Games directly involved over 1,600 people in venue site operating services. Sixty-five percent of them were non-management in various capacities such as building mechanical personnel (electrician, plumbing, HVAC), 20% were construction foreman and unskilled personnel, and 5% were sound and light technicians. They chiefly worked in continuous shifts during the games and were on-call at all other operational times. Waste operation at the venues during those games involved 52 paid staff, 45 volunteers, and 2,800 contractors.

The marathon course was run on the route used for the 1896 Summer Olympics, though the 1896 race was 40 km (25 mi) long while the 2004 race was 42.195 km (26.2 mi) long. For the first time since 369 AD, an athletic event took place at the Stadium at Olympia. with American Kristin Heaston making the first in the shot put event. Although Heaston was the first woman to compete at Olympia, she did not make it the final. That event was won by Cuba's Yumileidi Cumbá, who moved up from silver after initial winner Irina Korzhanenko of Russia failed her doping test.

The canoeing slalom course at Ellinikon was the first one to use saltwater. This was pumped directly from the Aegean Sea. For the men's individual road cycling race held at Kotzia Square in downtown Athens, only 75 of the 144 cyclists completed the 224 km (139 mi) race held in 100 °F (38 °C) heat.

Women's trap shooting at the Markopoulo Shooting Range was held in blustery conditions. This event was won by Australia's Suzanne Balogh.

== After the Olympics ==
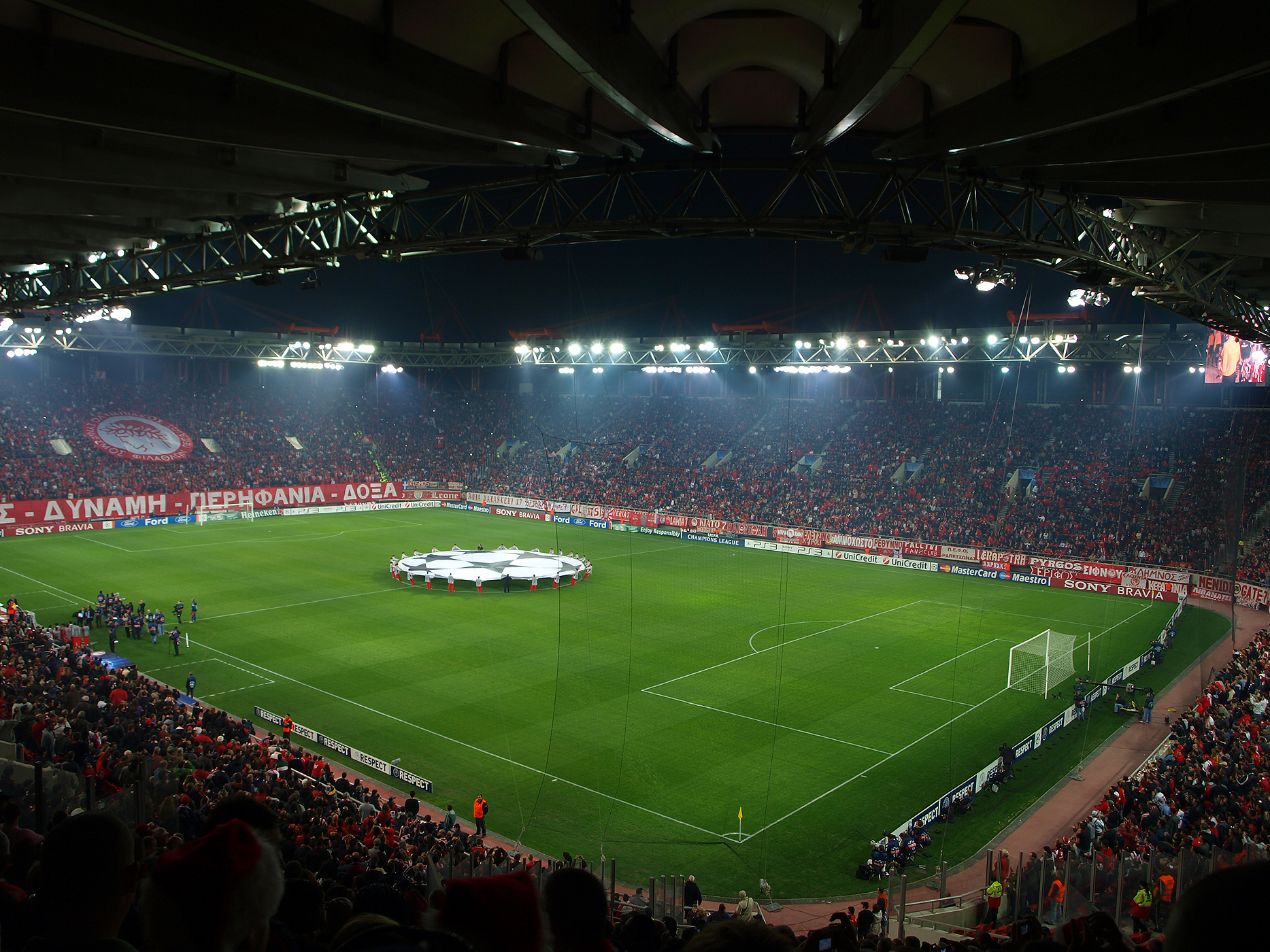
Karaiskasis Stadium (pictured in 2009) hosted several football matches for the 2004 Summer Olympics and was where the Neo Phaliron Velodrome was constructed for the track cycling events at the 1896 Summer Olympics.

The OAKA area has hosted numerous events since the ending of the 2004 Summer Paralympics, including Madonna, Pearl Jam and Shakira concerts in 2006 and basketball's Euroleague Final Four, won by home team Panathinaikos, in 2007.

HOC has hosted numerous events as well, including the European Rowing Championships at Schinias in 2008, blues guitarist Gary Moore in 2008, and ART-ATHINA in 2010.

In the Faliro Coastal Zone Olympic Complex, the Faliro Sports Pavilion is known as Athens International Convention Center, Peace and Friendship Stadium is a multipurpose venue, and the Beach Volleyball Centre is an outdoor conference venue.

After the Olympics, the Goudi Olympic Hall was converted into the Badminton Theater in honor of the sport it hosted for the 2004 Games, and opened in 2007.

The Markopoulo Shooting Centre has all but one of its sections turned over to the Hellenic Police, with the Passport Office and Special Forces scheduled to relocate there as well.

Ano Liosia Arena was converted into an arts and entertainment facility after the Olympics.

Several of the venues have not found a post-Games use, and have fallen into disrepair in the years since, including the canoe/kayak centre, hockey centre, and softball stadium.

=== Hellinikon Metropolitan Park ===
The Hellinikon Olympic Complex is being converted into a new park called Hellinikon Metropolitan Park. It will feature the Hard Rock Hotel & Casino Athens which will open in 2027 and will become the first integrated resort in continental Europe. The park will also become the home of the new Riviera Tower which will be a residential tower.
