= Athens Riviera =

Athens Riviera Αθηναϊκή Ριβιέρα
- Riviera
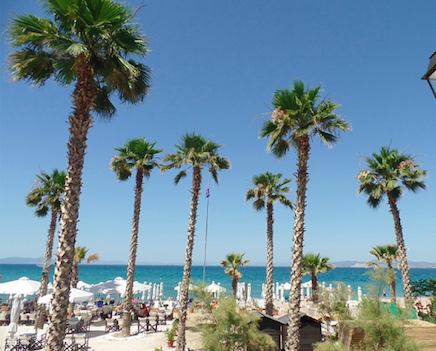
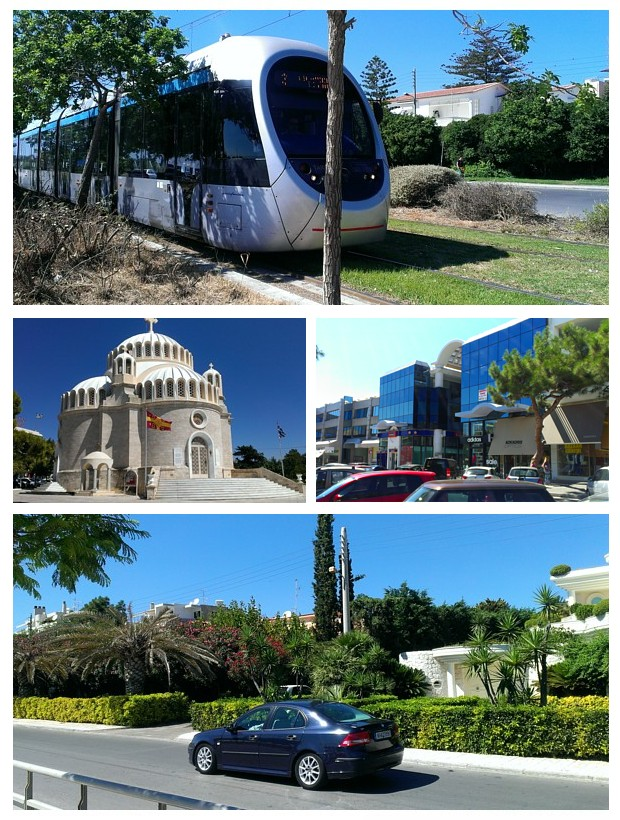
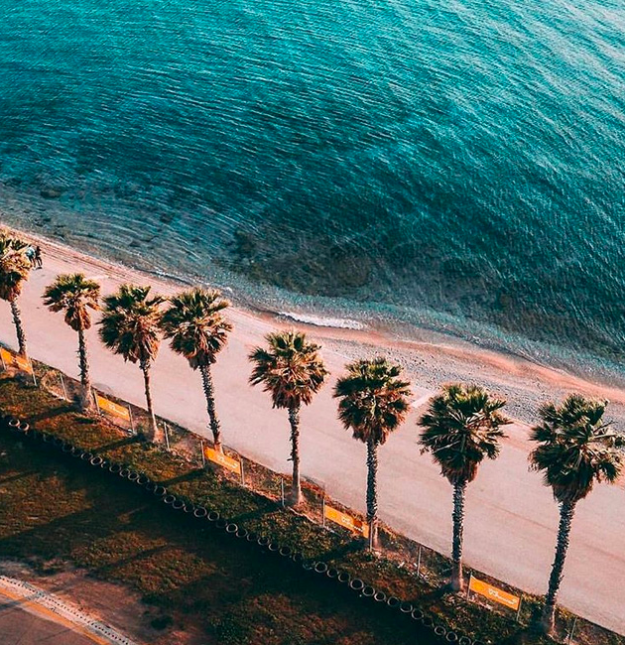
- Interactive map of Athens Riviera
- Coordinates: 37°51′58″N 23°44′24″E
- Country: Greece
- Administrative region: Attica
- Municipalities: Piraeus; Moschato-Tavros; Kallithea; Alimos; Palaio Faliro; Elliniko-Argyroupoli; Glyfada; Vari-Voula-Vouliagmeni; Saronikos; Lavreotiki

Dimensions
  - Length: 70 km (43 mi)
- Elevation: 0–50 m (0–164 ft)

Population
  - Total: 0.7 million

Athens Riviera (Greek: Αθηναϊκή Ριβιέρα) is the coastal area in the southern suburbs of Athens, Greece, extending from Piraeus to Sounio and Lavrio. It is located about 16 km (9.9 mi) from downtown Athens stretching from the southern suburbs of Athens to the southernmost points of Attica.

== History ==
=== Modern era ===
Since the 1920s the Greek government planned for a regeneration of the Riviera but the political instability did not allow it. In 1954, Kathimerini newspaper published an article arguing that Glyfada and Voula could become more popular than the French Riviera in the coming years. In 1957, the plan for the development of the Athens Riviera started with the creation of Asteria in Glyfada and the area started gradually to become popular among the Athenians also through the help of Greek cinema. Plans to erect the highest building in Greece which will be called the Athens Riviera Tower are currently underway.

=== Ancient times ===
Piraeus has been inhabited since the 26th century BC. In ancient Greece, Piraeus assumed its importance with its three deep-water harbours, the main port of Cantharus and the two smaller of Zea and Munichia, and gradually replaced the older and shallow Phaleron harbour, which fell into disuse. In 493 BC, Themistocles initiated the fortification works in Piraeus and later advised the Athenians to take advantage of its natural harbours' strategic potential instead of using the sandy bay of Phaleron. After the second Persian invasion of Greece, Themistocles fortified the three harbours of Piraeus and created the neosoikoi (ship houses); the Themistoclean Walls were completed in 471 BC, turning Piraeus into a great military and commercial harbour.

The city's fortification was farther reinforced later by the construction of the Long Walls under Cimon and Pericles, with which secure port's (Piraeus) route to Athens main city. Meanwhile, Piraeus was rebuilt to the famous grid plan of architect Hippodamus of Miletus, known as the Hippodamian plan, and the main agora of the city was named after him in honour. As a result, Piraeus flourished and became a port of high security and great commercial activity, and a city bustling with life.

During the Peloponnesian War, Piraeus suffered its first setback. In the second year of the war, the first cases of the Athens plague were recorded in Piraeus. In 404 BC, the Spartan fleet under Lysander blockaded Piraeus and subsequently, Athens surrendered to the Spartans, putting an end to the Delian League and the war itself. After the reinstatement of democracy, Conon rebuilt the walls in 393 BC, founded the temple of Aphrodite Euploia and the sanctuary of Zeus Sotiros and Athena, and built the famous Skeuotheke (arsenal) of Philon, the ruins of which have been discovered at Zea harbour.

The reconstruction of Piraeus went on during the period of Alexander the Great, but this revival of the town was quashed by Roman Lucius Cornelius Sulla, who captured and totally destroyed Piraeus in 86 BC. The destruction was completed in 395 AD by the Goths under Alaric I. Piraeus was led to a long period of decline which lasted for fifteen centuries. During the Byzantine period the harbor of Piraeus was occasionally used for the Byzantine fleet, but it was very far from the capital city of Constantinople.

In Vouliagmeni ruins of the Temple of Apollo Zoster have been excavated and can be viewed inside the public Astir Hotel beach. According to legend, when Leto was about to give birth to Apollo and Artemis, she fled writhing in pain to Delos. Other remnants of early human habitation found in the Riviera include Neolithic and Bronze Age building foundations, and a 5th-century BC outpost.

In ancient times, Glyfada was a deme known as Aixone (Αἰξωνή). Today, Glyfada is packed with some of the capital's best-known nightclubs, upscale restaurants, and shops. It could be argued to be one of the most "Americanized" of Athenian municipalities since an American airbase was located in nearby Elliniko until the early 1990s.

The Temple of Poseidon at Sounion was built during 444–440 BC, is one of the major monuments of the Golden Age of Athens. It is perched above the sea at a height of almost 60 meters. The Sounion Kouros, discovered in 1906 in a pit east of the temple alongside fragments of other statues, was probably one of a number of votive statues dedicated to Poseidon which probably stood in front of the god's sanctuary. The archaic temple was probably destroyed in 480 BC by Persian troops during Xerxes I's invasion of Greece. After they defeated Xerxes in the naval Battle of Salamis, the Athenians placed an entire captured enemy trireme (warship with three banks of oars) at Sounion as a trophy dedicated to Poseidon. The temple of Athena Sounias at Sounion was built in 470 BC, replacing an older building of the 6th century. Its architecture was unusual inasmuch as it had a colonnade on the southern and eastern, but not on the western or northern sides, a peculiarity mentioned by Vitruvius.

== Main areas ==
According to the Greek National Tourism Organisation the main areas of the Athens Riviera are: the Bay of Zea, Aenaon Park, Elliniko, Glyfada, Voula, Vouliagmeni, Lagonisi, Varkiza, Anavyssos and Sounio.

== Development ==
Greece is set to develop the area of the former Athens airport in Elliniko in the coming years. Work began on the Ellinikon Metropolitan Park in July 2020. It will feature the Hard Rock Hotel & Casino Athens, which will become the first integrated resort in continental Europe when it opens in 2027. The development will also feature luxury hotels, conference and recreation facilities on the disused airport site, as a way to further boost investments in Greece and attract more visitors in the Athens Riviera.

It is estimated that around 10 billion euros will be invested in the Elliniko and Athens Riviera development and regeneration. The regeneration projects put a stop to the property price slump compared to other areas of Athens and estate agents (mostly from China and Turkey) are very active in areas around the Athens Riviera.

According to Bloomberg, the Athens Riviera can help Greece's tourism industry by almost doubling the tourism revenue that will be achieved by further development of the Riviera. It is estimated that the regeneration projects will attract many professionals such as chefs, receptionists, and various hospitality experts.

Furthermore, there are plans to develop luxury facilities that will integrate elements of Greek culture in and around the area of Elliniko in the coming years, however not many details are currently known about the exact structure of the project that will take place in the next few years.

The Faliro Delta is also being redeveloped as a major urban waterfront park to be called Aenaon Park, with an expected completion in 2028.

== Riviera Tower ==
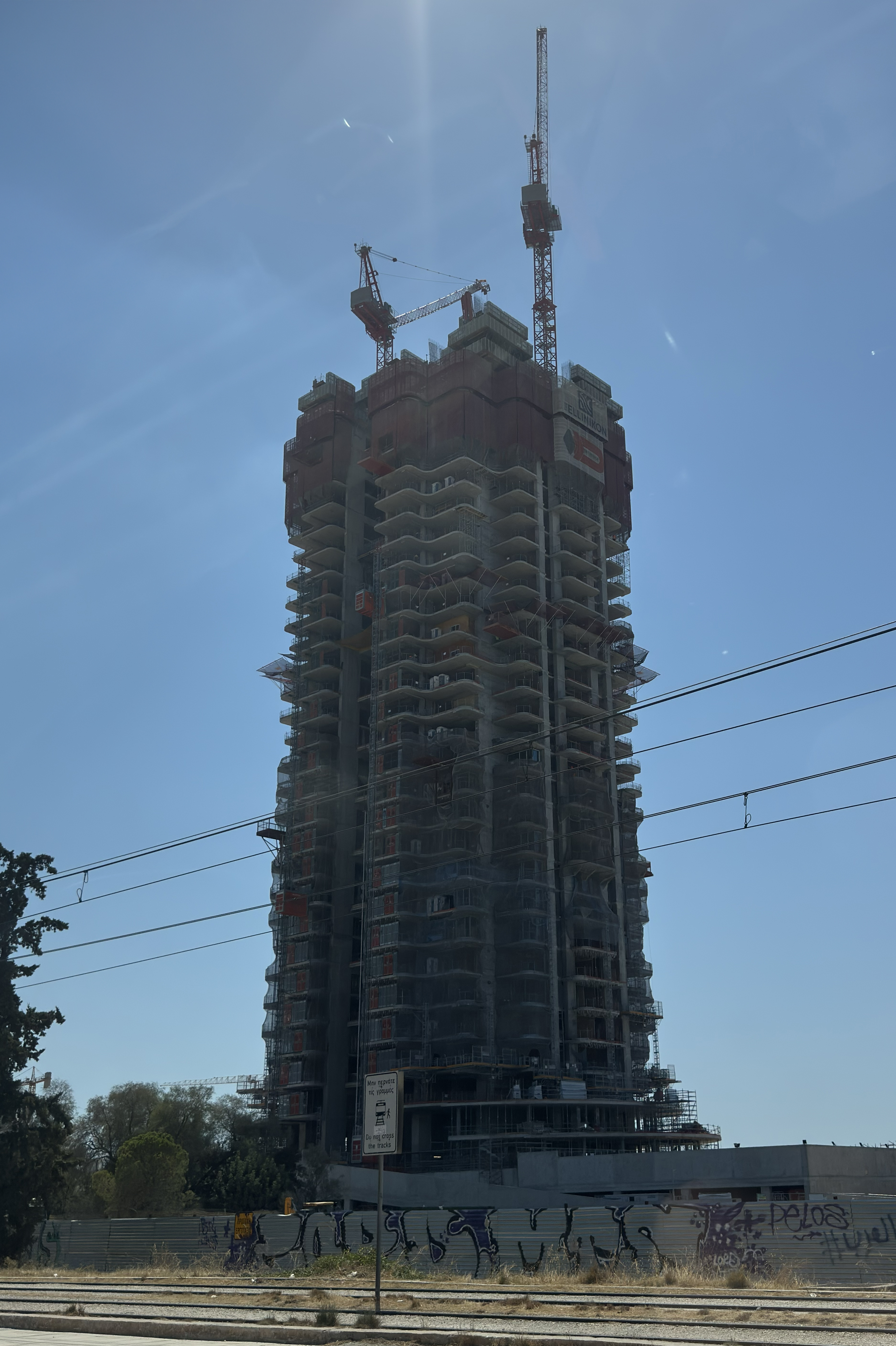
Riviera Tower under construction in September 2025

Riviera Tower, also known as Marina Tower or Ellinikon Tower, is a skyscraper currently under construction in Athens, Greece. Located at the coastal district of Elliniko, it will be the tallest building in Greece at a height of 200 m (660 ft). The tower, designed by Foster + Partners, will host 90 flats on 50 floors when completed in 2026. It will feature green building characteristics and its developers aim for LEED Gold certification. The tower is a part of the Hellenikon Metropolitan Park.

The Riviera Tower is part of the redevelopment of the former Ellinikon International Airport, undertaken by the company Lamda Development. The plans for the skyscraper were presented online on July 7, 2021. The tower was designed by the international architectural firm "Foster+Partners", which collaborated with the "Alexandros N. Tombazis and Associates Architects S.A." design office. The engineering company Buro Happold undertook the structural studies in cooperation with Deta Engineering, and the electromechanical studies in cooperation with LDK Consultants S.A. & TEKEM S.A. The company Doxiadis+ was responsible for the landscaping design. The collaboration of Greek and foreign companies was due to the requirements set by the project's tender regarding experience and expertise. The building permit for the skyscraper was issued on August 9, 2022. On August 13, 2022, Lamda Development announced that three-quarters of the sellable area had been pre-sold, with estimated revenues of approximately 600 million euros.

Construction began in December 2022 with the installation of two 55-meter-long piles for the building's foundation, which began in January 2023. A total of 111 piles with a diameter of 1.5 meters were installed. The foundation was completed at the end of October 2023, with the placement of 7,500 cubic meters of concrete over 40 continuous hours.

Adjacent to the Riviera Tower will be the Hard Rock Hotel & Casino Athens, the first integrated resort in Greece.

== Climate ==
The Athens Riviera enjoys a mild climate throughout the year with a mean annual temperature of up to 19.4 °C (66.9 °F) locally. It is considered the warmest area in continental Europe.

Under the Köppen climate classification the Athens Riviera has a hot semi-arid climate (BSh) and lies in the transition zone between this climate and the hot-summer Mediterranean climate (Csa) of downtown Athens. According to the data provided by the Hellenic National Meteorological Service, Elliniko which is located in the Riviera, has a marginal hot semi-arid climate (BSh) bordering a Mediterranean climate (Csa). Piraeus, Athens' port-city also falls into the hot semi-arid climate (Köppen climate classification: BSh) category according to the climate atlas published by the Hellenic National Meteorological Service.

Anavyssos is the driest area in mainland Greece, the Attica peninsula and the Athens Riviera with around 290 mm of annual precipitation.

Climate data for Piraeus Hellenic National Meteorological Service (1981-2010)
Month	Jan	Feb	Mar	Apr	May	Jun	Jul	Aug	Sep	Oct	Nov	Dec	Year
Mean daily maximum °C (°F)	14.1 (57.4)	14.4 (57.9)	16.6 (61.9)	20.3 (68.5)	25.1 (77.2)	29.9 (85.8)	32.8 (91.0)	32.9 (91.2)	29.1 (84.4)	24.2 (75.6)	18.9 (66.0)	15.4 (59.7)	22.81 (73.06)
Daily mean °C (°F)	11.1 (52.0)	11.2 (52.2)	13.3 (55.9)	16.9 (62.4)	21.4 (70.5)	26.3 (79.3)	29.0 (84.2)	28.8 (83.8)	25.2 (77.4)	20.6 (69.1)	15.8 (60.4)	12.6 (54.7)	19.35 (66.83)
Mean daily minimum °C (°F)	8.2 (46.8)	7.9 (46.2)	10.0 (50.0)	13.4 (56.1)	17.7 (63.9)	22.2 (72.0)	24.8 (76.6)	25.0 (77.0)	21.5 (70.7)	17.4 (63.3)	12.9 (55.2)	9.7 (49.5)	15.89 (60.60)
Average rainfall mm (inches)	41.95 (1.65)	36.26 (1.43)	34.09 (1.34)	30.34 (1.19)	15.95 (0.63)	5.08 (0.20)	5.56 (0.22)	3.07 (0.12)	11.37 (0.45)	30.5 (1.20)	58.87 (2.32)	58.84 (2.32)	331.9 (13.07)
Source: National Technical University of Athens

Climate data for Elliniko, coastal Athens (1955–2010), Extremes (1957–present), 28 m asl
Month	Jan	Feb	Mar	Apr	May	Jun	Jul	Aug	Sep	Oct	Nov	Dec	Year
Record high °C (°F)	22.4 (72.3)	24.2 (75.6)	27.0 (80.6)	30.9 (87.6)	35.6 (96.1)	40.0 (104.0)	42.2 (108.0)	43.0 (109.4)	37.2 (99.0)	35.2 (95.4)	28.6 (83.5)	22.9 (73.2)	43.0 (109.4)
Mean daily maximum °C (°F)	13.6 (56.5)	14.1 (57.4)	15.9 (60.6)	19.6 (67.3)	24.4 (75.9)	29.2 (84.6)	32.2 (90.0)	32.2 (90.0)	28.3 (82.9)	23.4 (74.1)	18.8 (65.8)	15.1 (59.2)	22.2 (72.0)
Daily mean °C (°F)	10.3 (50.5)	10.6 (51.1)	12.4 (54.3)	16.1 (61.0)	20.9 (69.6)	25.6 (78.1)	28.3 (82.9)	28.2 (82.8)	24.3 (75.7)	19.6 (67.3)	15.4 (59.7)	11.9 (53.4)	18.6 (65.5)
Mean daily minimum °C (°F)	7.0 (44.6)	7.1 (44.8)	8.5 (47.3)	11.5 (52.7)	15.8 (60.4)	20.3 (68.5)	23.0 (73.4)	23.1 (73.6)	19.6 (67.3)	15.7 (60.3)	12.0 (53.6)	8.8 (47.8)	14.4 (57.9)
Record low °C (°F)	−2.9 (26.8)	−4.2 (24.4)	−2.0 (28.4)	0.6 (33.1)	8.0 (46.4)	11.4 (52.5)	15.5 (59.9)	16.0 (60.8)	10.4 (50.7)	3.0 (37.4)	1.4 (34.5)	−2.0 (28.4)	−4.2 (24.4)
Average rainfall mm (inches)	47.7 (1.88)	38.5 (1.52)	42.3 (1.67)	25.5 (1.00)	14.3 (0.56)	5.4 (0.21)	6.3 (0.25)	6.2 (0.24)	12.3 (0.48)	45.9 (1.81)	60.1 (2.37)	62.0 (2.44)	366.5 (14.43)
Average rainy days	12.9	11.4	11.3	9.3	6.4	3.6	1.7	1.6	4.7	8.6	10.9	13.5	95.9
Average relative humidity (%)	69.3	68.0	65.9	62.2	58.2	51.8	46.6	46.8	54.0	62.6	69.2	70.4	60.4
Mean monthly sunshine hours	130.2	134.4	182.9	231.0	291.4	336.0	362.7	341.0	276.0	207.7	153.0	127.1	2,773.4
Source 1: HNMS (1955–2010 normals)
Source 2: Deutscher Wetterdienst (Extremes 1961–1990), Info Climat (Extremes 1991–present)

Climate data for Anavyssos 10 m a.s.l. (2012-2025)
Month	Jan	Feb	Mar	Apr	May	Jun	Jul	Aug	Sep	Oct	Nov	Dec	Year
Record high °C (°F)	21.3 (70.3)	22.9 (73.2)	24.3 (75.7)	32.0 (89.6)	32.9 (91.2)	38.4 (101.1)	40.2 (104.4)	41.9 (107.4)	36.2 (97.2)	33.4 (92.1)	26.9 (80.4)	22.7 (72.9)	41.9 (107.4)
Mean daily maximum °C (°F)	14.6 (58.3)	15.4 (59.7)	17.4 (63.3)	21.1 (70.0)	25.1 (77.2)	30.3 (86.5)	33.7 (92.7)	33.4 (92.1)	29.1 (84.4)	24.4 (75.9)	20.0 (68.0)	15.9 (60.6)	23.4 (74.1)
Daily mean °C (°F)	11.4 (52.5)	12.1 (53.8)	13.7 (56.7)	16.7 (62.1)	20.7 (69.3)	25.6 (78.1)	28.8 (83.8)	28.8 (83.8)	24.8 (76.6)	20.7 (69.3)	16.9 (62.4)	12.6 (54.7)	19.4 (66.9)
Mean daily minimum °C (°F)	8.1 (46.6)	8.7 (47.7)	10.0 (50.0)	12.3 (54.1)	16.4 (61.5)	20.9 (69.6)	23.8 (74.8)	24.3 (75.7)	20.5 (68.9)	17.0 (62.6)	13.7 (56.7)	9.6 (49.3)	15.4 (59.8)
Record low °C (°F)	−2.5 (27.5)	1.0 (33.8)	1.6 (34.9)	4.8 (40.6)	10.8 (51.4)	13.4 (56.1)	18.2 (64.8)	19.8 (67.6)	14.6 (58.3)	9.3 (48.7)	5.7 (42.3)	1.5 (34.7)	−2.5 (27.5)
Average rainfall mm (inches)	52.3 (2.06)	31.7 (1.25)	33.8 (1.33)	12.0 (0.47)	5.1 (0.20)	7.4 (0.29)	2.9 (0.11)	1.1 (0.04)	13.0 (0.51)	21.8 (0.86)	46.3 (1.82)	64.1 (2.52)	291.5 (11.46)
Source: National Observatory of Athens (Jun 2012- Sep 2025) Hellenic Centre for Marine Research World Meteorological Organization

== Access from Central Athens ==
By tram

- T6 line from Syntagma towards Pikrodafni station
- T7 line from Piraeus (Akti Poseidonos station) towards Voúla (Asklipiío Voúlas station)

By bus

- A1 route (Piraeus-Voula)
- A2 route (Akadimia-Voula)
- B2 route (Syggrou Fix Metro station-Ag.Kosmas)
- 122 route (Argyroupoli Metro station-Saronida)
- 123 route (Saronida-Anavyssos-Palaia Fokea)
