= Hellinikon Stadium =

Stadium at the Hellinikon Olympic Complex in Hellinikon, Athens, Greece

Coordinates: 37°53′51″N 23°43′45″E

Olympic Baseball Centre Athens

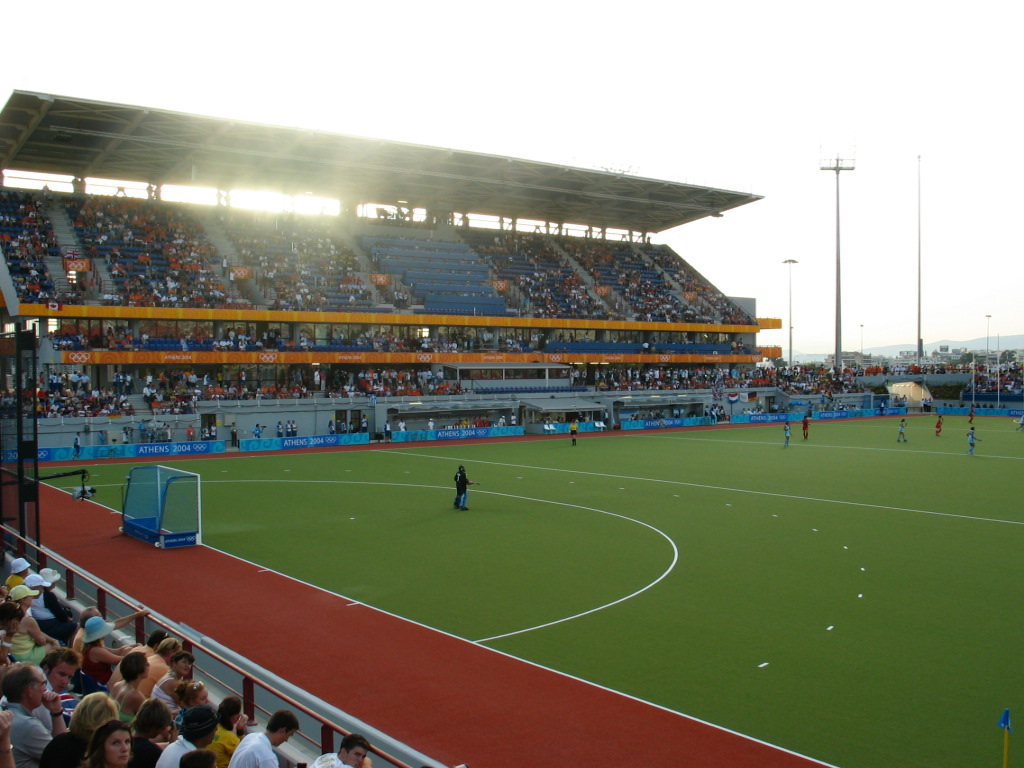
Hockey Stadium

Hellinikon Stadium was a stadium located at the Hellinikon Olympic Complex in Hellinikon, Athens, located approximately 8 kilometres south of the center of Athens, near Glyfada on the Aegean Sea coast. Ethnikos Piraeus F.C. played its home matches there from 2007 to 2014, as did the Athens Pirates.

The complex was built on the site of the former Hellinikon International Airport for the staging of the 2004 Summer Olympics and 2004 Summer Paralympics and consisted of the following venues: Hellinikon Indoor Arena (Basketball and Team handball); Hellinikon Fencing Hall; Olympic Hockey Stadium (Field hockey); Helliniko Baseball Centre; Hellinikon Olympic Softball Stadium; and Hellinikon Slalom Centre (Whitewater slalom).

== After the Olympics ==
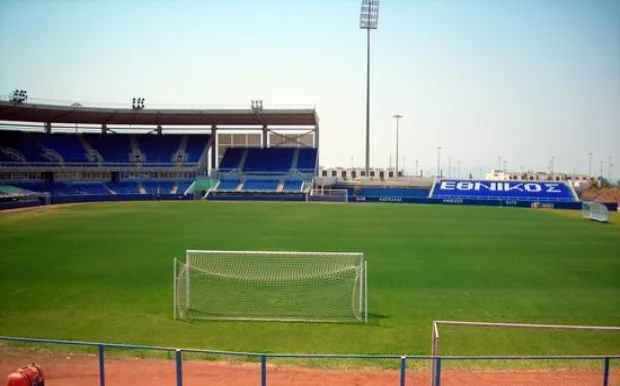
Football Stadium

The Olympic Baseball Centre's main stadium underwent renovations for football use, and Ethnikos began playing matches there during the 2007–08 season; the team played its first official match in its new home on October 20, 2007. The facility became known as Hellinikon Stadium, and is commonly referred to as Helliniko.

The complex also includes new training pitches for both Ethnikos' first team and youth team.

Ahead of the 2008–09 season renovations continued and seating capacity was increased to 10,000.

In 2016, it was used as a refugee camp for those awaiting processing in Greece.

As of 2023 the stadium was demolished leaving the footprint of the baseball field visible.

== See also ==
- Hellinikon Olympic Complex
