= Hellinikon Olympic Complex =

Sports complex in Greece

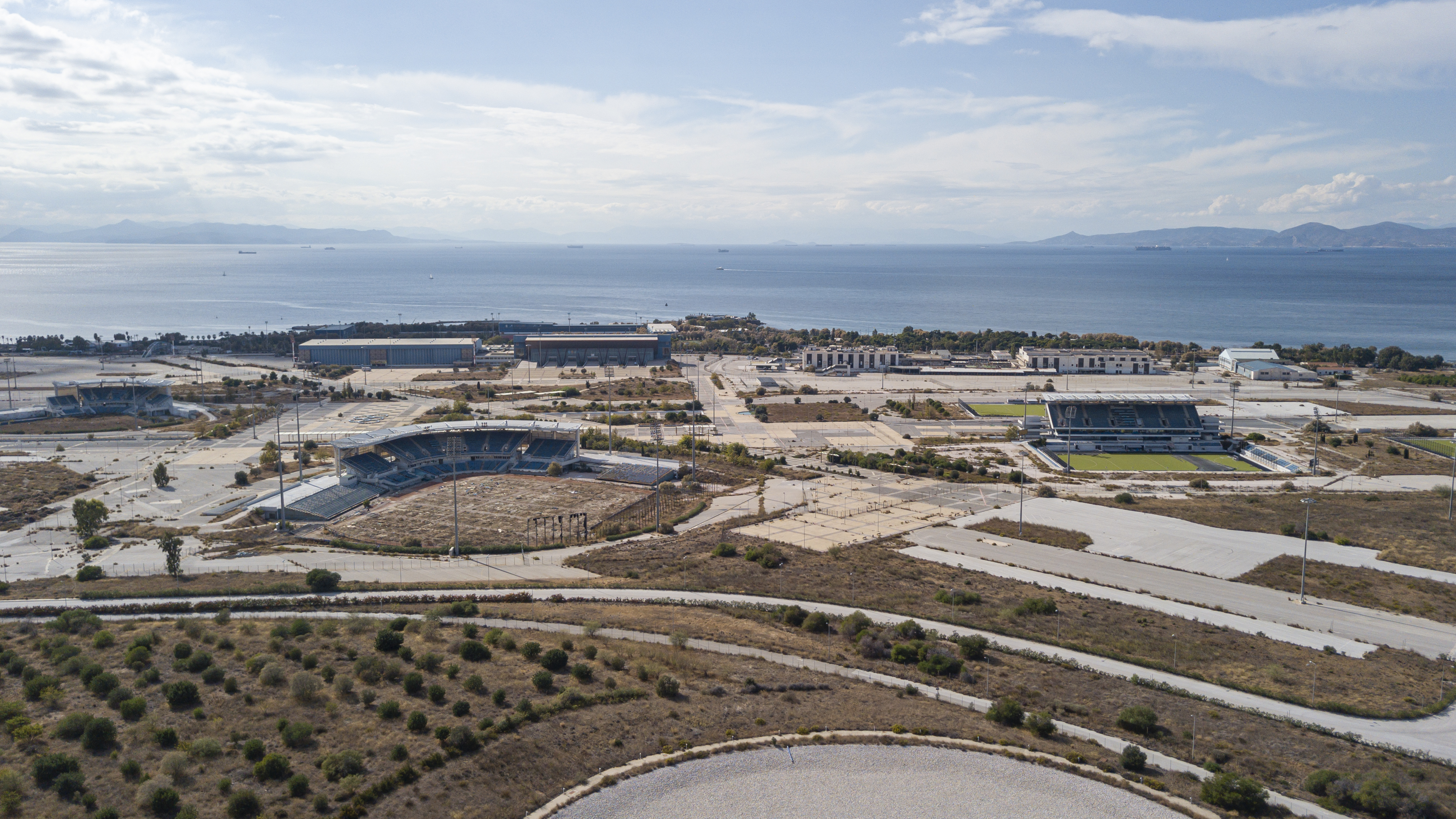
Hellinikon Olympic Complex in 2019

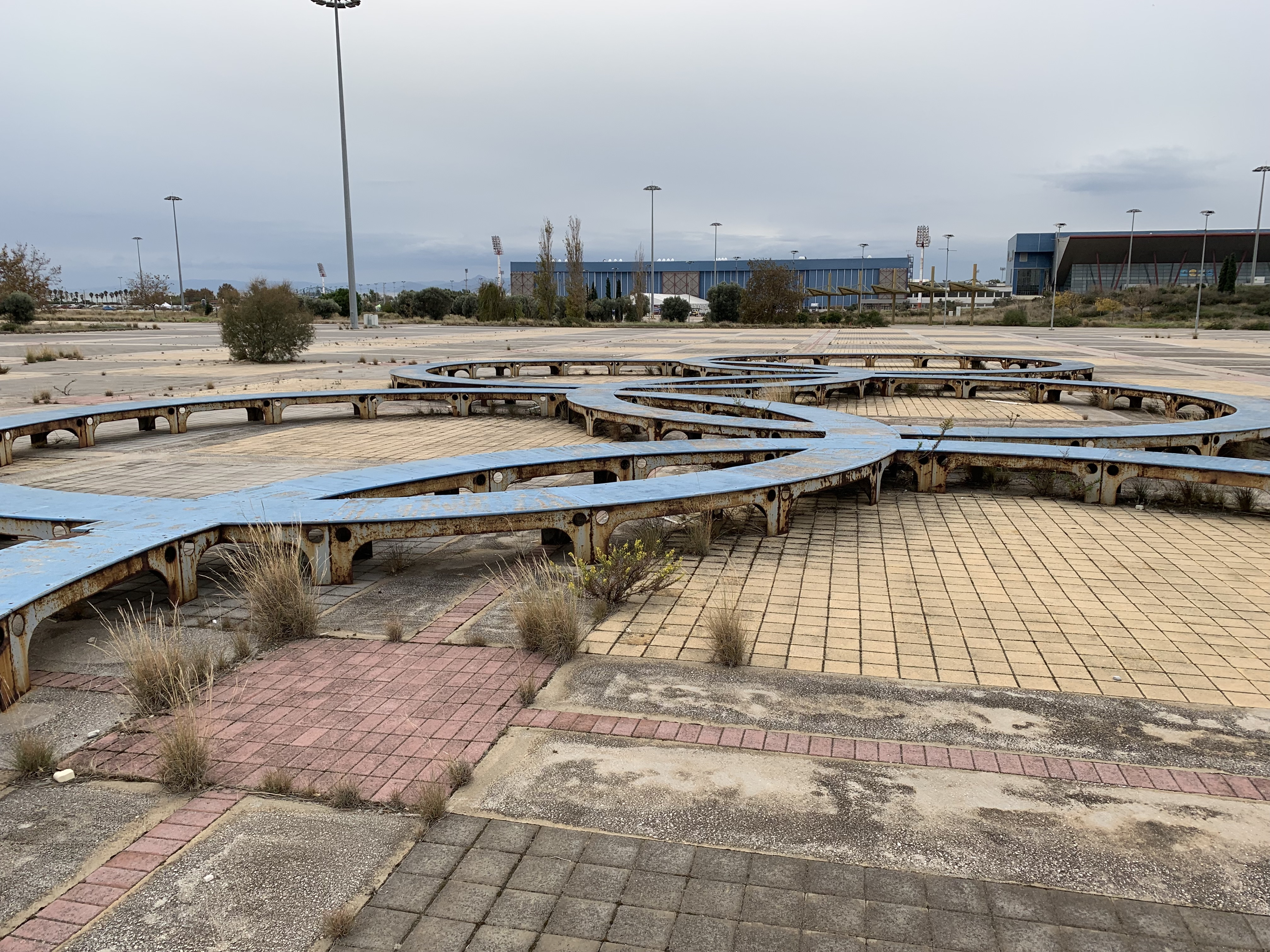
External 2004 Olympic Rings in November 2018

The Hellinikon Olympic Complex is a closed, partially demolished sports complex, situated at Elliniko, a suburban town in the southern part of the Athens urban agglomeration, approximately 16 kilometres from the Olympic Village. It was built on the site of the former Hellinikon International Airport for the staging of the 2004 Summer Olympics and 2004 Summer Paralympics. It consists of five separate venues.

== Venues ==
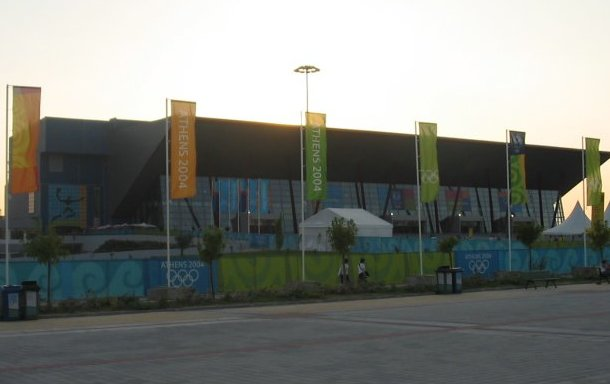
Exterior view of the Hellinikon Indoor Arena

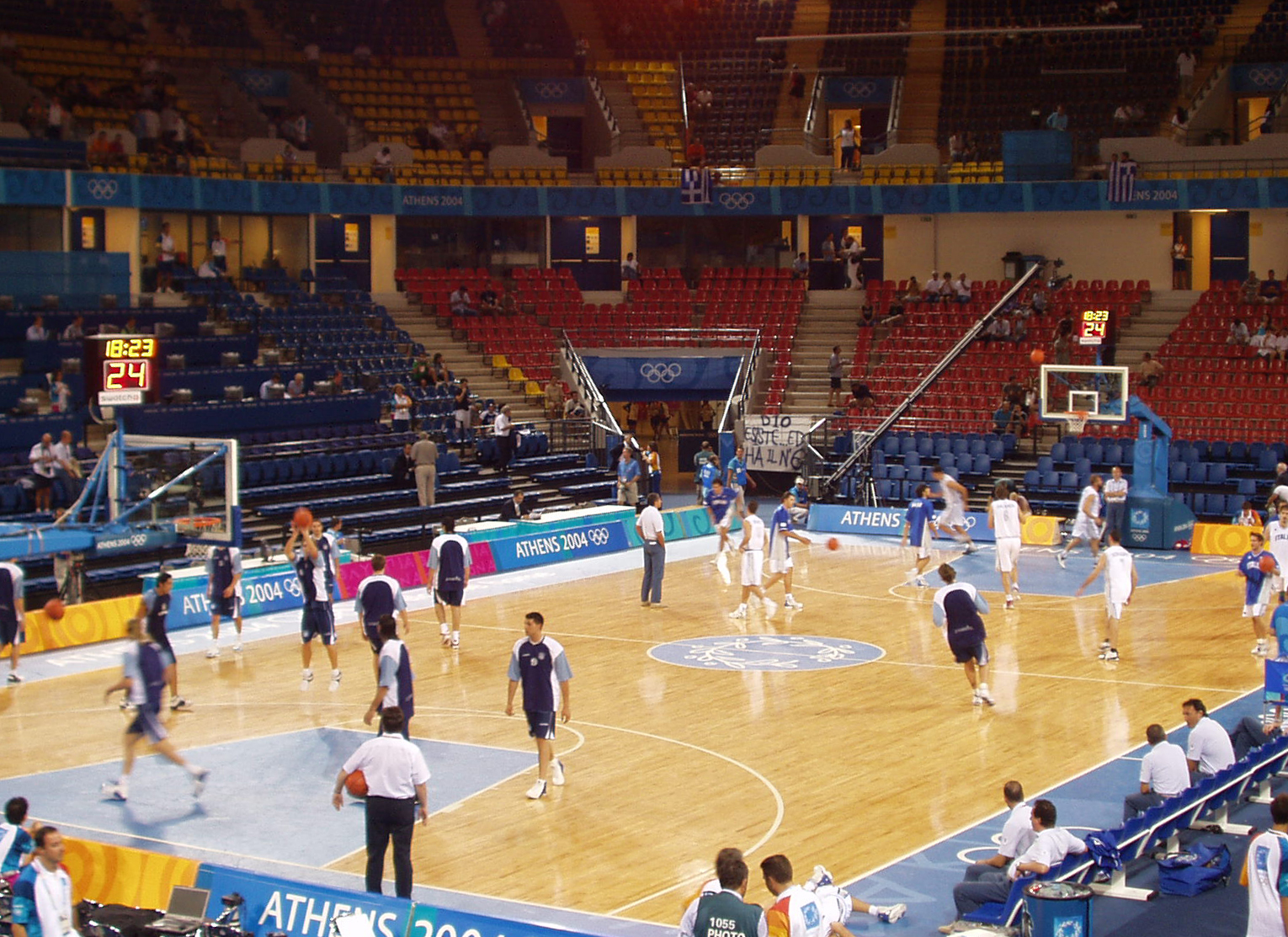
Interior of the arena during the 2004 Summer Olympics

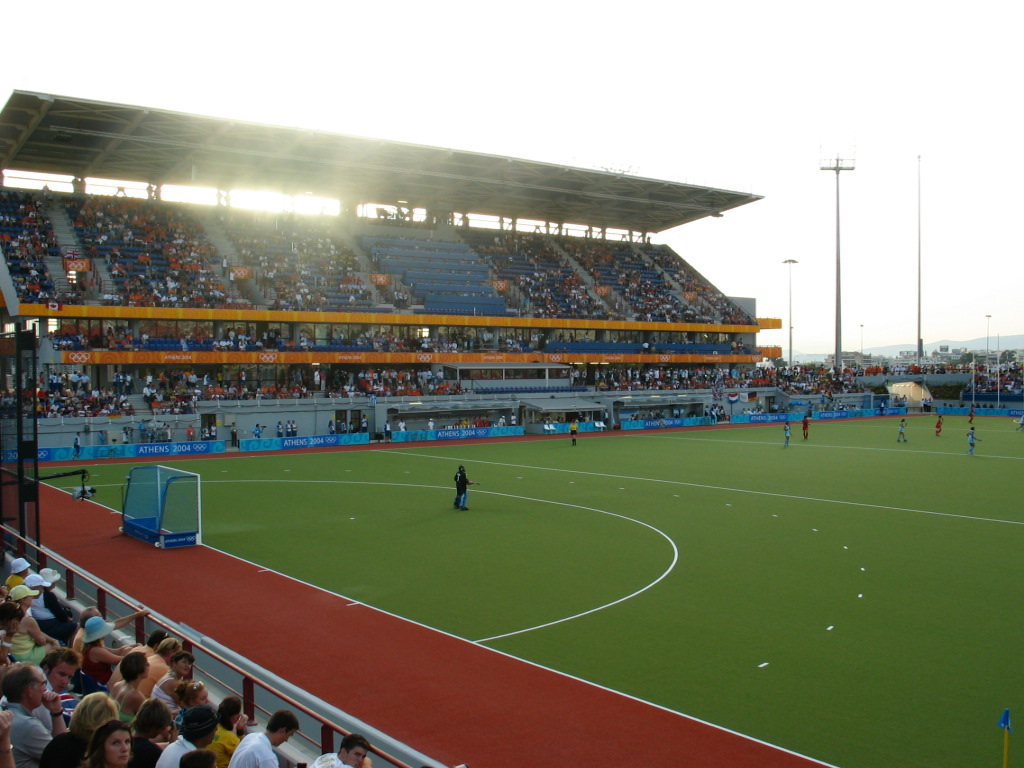
Olympic Hockey Centre

=== Hellinikon Indoor Arena ===
The Indoor arena was an arena adjacent to the Fencing Hall. It hosted the Basketball preliminary matches and the Handball finals at the 2004 Summer Olympics in Athens, Greece. The facility seats 15,000 spectators for basketball, although only 10,700 seats were made publicly available during the Olympics - and seats 13,500 fans for handball - though only 10,300 seats were made publicly available during the games. The facility was completed on May 31, 2004 and officially opened on July 30, 2004.

During the 2004 Summer Paralympic Games, the Indoor Arena was the venue for Wheelchair rugby. It has also been the home arena of the Greek basketball club Panionios, and it has also hosted several finals matches of the Greek Cup. The Greek basketball club Panellinios also played European cup home games at the arena.

It was demolished in 2022.

=== Fencing Hall ===
Demolished along with the arena and other buildings in 2022.

=== Olympic Baseball Centre ===
The Olympic Baseball Centre in Athens consists of two Baseball stadiums. It was the site of the Baseball games at the 2004 Summer Olympics in Athens, Greece. The larger stadium seats 8,700 fans-though only 6,700 seats were made publicly available during the Olympics; the smaller stadium seats 4,000 spectators, though only 3,300 seats were made publicly available during the Games. The facility had to be constructed with significant foreign help in the design, as there were only a handful of dusty baseball diamonds in the whole of Greece before the 2004 Olympics were awarded to Athens in 1997. Construction on the facility was completed on February 27, 2004, and it was officially opened on August 12, 2004, a day before the Opening Ceremonies. During the 2004 Summer Paralympic Games, the Olympic Baseball Centre was the venue for Archery. Demolished in 2023.

=== Olympic Canoe-Kayak Slalom Centre ===
Only venue of the complex that will not be demolished after the Hellenikon Metropolitan Park is built. The venue will be transformed to a pond.

== Post-Olympics development ==
The table below lists the current status and usage of the Hellinikon Olympic Complex facilities. Venues in italics have been demolished.

Facility	Olympics Use	Current/Proposed Use
Hellinikon Basketball Stadium	Basketball, Handball	Home court for Panellinios BC and Panionios BC (basketball). Conventions and trade shows Also part of events hall with fencing hall.
Hellinikon Olympic Canoe/Kayak Slalom Centre	Canoe/Kayak	Turned over to a private consortium (J&P AVAX, GEP, Corfu Waterparks and BIOTER), plans to convert it to a water park
Hellinikon Fencing Hall	Fencing	Part of events hall with the basketball stadium.
Hellinikon Olympic Hockey Centre	Field Hockey	Mini-football, will be part of new Hellinikon metropolitan park complex
Hellinikon Baseball Stadium	Baseball	Converted to football pitch, home field of Ethnikos Piraeus F.C. (Football; Greek second division)
Hellinikon Olympic Softball Stadium	Softball	Concerts

The site was used to house refugees, housing up to 5,000 people before being shut down in 2017.

=== Hellinikon Metropolitan Park development ===
Work is under way to convert much of the former Hellinikon International Airport site to a park called the Hellinikon Metropolitan Park, that requires the demolition of the complex's Olympic venues. The Hard Rock Hotel & Casino Athens and the Riviera Tower are being built at the site. The Hard Rock Hotel & Casino will be the first integrated resort in Greece while the Riviera Tower will be a residential tower.
