= David Serero =

David Serero may refer to:

- David Serero (architect)
- David Serero (singer)
