= Hellenic Imperial Airways =

Greek airline

IATA	ICAO	Call sign
HT	IMP	IMPERIAL
- Founded: May 2006
- Ceased operations: 2012
- AOC #: GR-025
- Operating bases: Athens International Airport
- Fleet size: 4 (at time of closure)
- Headquarters: Ellinikon, Greece
- Key people: Talal Abu Reyal, CEO
- Website: hellenicairways.com

Hellenic Imperial Airways was an airline which had its head office in Ellinikon, South Athens, Greece. It operated charter and scheduled flights. The company slogan was Your direct flight around the globe!

== History ==
The airline was incorporated in May 2006 by a team of industry veterans and operated charter flights and aircraft leasing on an ACMI basis. The airline's head office was in Elliniko, South Athens. The United Kingdom offices were at the Axis House in Harlington, London Borough of Hillingdon. The South Africa offices were the Holiday House in Randburg, Johannesburg.

The airline commenced scheduled operations on 30 May 2009 with services between Athens and Birmingham UK, Jeddah Saudi Arabia, and Casablanca Morocco.

Hellenic Imperial Airways launched its new website in April 2010 as a part of a promotional campaign for the company's new activities. The new website allowed customers to book services online and had live news feeds regarding flights and services.

In early May 2010, Hellenic Imperial announced it was to begin scheduled services to Johannesburg's OR Tambo International Airport on 8 June 2010. These flights filled the gap left by Olympic Airlines when it ceased services to the airport the previous September.

During the 2011 Libyan civil war Hellenic Imperial Airways operated charter services from Tripoli to Heraklion and from Heraklion directly to Bangkok, Shanghai, Beijing and Hanoi. In total the carrier evacuated 3,000 Chinese citizens from Libya via Greece.

On 24 June 2011, Hellenic Imperial Airways inaugurated its first direct flight HT0411 from Athens to New York JFK operated by Boeing 747-200B as opposed to the planned Airbus A340-300. Pakistan International Airlines had leased two Boeing 747-200 during the Hajj 2011 for domestic operations within Pakistan.

At the end of 2011, Hellenic Imperial Airways suspended all of its scheduled flights. It operated very few charter flights in 2012; since then, the airline has suspended operations. Two of its Boeing 747-200B aircraft were abandoned at Athens International Airport while the remaining two were stored at Karachi and Jakarta.

In March 2015, former employees were granted the right by a Greek court to auction off for sale the remaining two 747s which were abandoned at Athens. Later that month the aircraft were to be ferried to Pakistan although in mid-flight the aircraft were diverted to Iran and entered into the Iran Air fleet. One of these airplanes is still stored at Athens International Airport.

== Destinations ==
=== Scheduled operations ===
Hellenic Imperial Airways served the following scheduled destinations:

- Greece
  - Athens - Base
- Kuwait
  - Kuwait City - (Never inaugurated, although loaded onto schedules)
- Morocco
  - Casablanca
- Saudi Arabia
  - Jeddah
- South Africa
  - Johannesburg
- United Kingdom
  - Birmingham
  - London - Gatwick (Never inaugurated, although loaded onto schedules)
- United States of America
  - New York - JFK

=== Charter operations ===
Hellenic Imperial Airways operated charter services throughout Europe, the Middle East, Asia and the Americas along with ACIM and wet-lease operations.

== Fleet ==
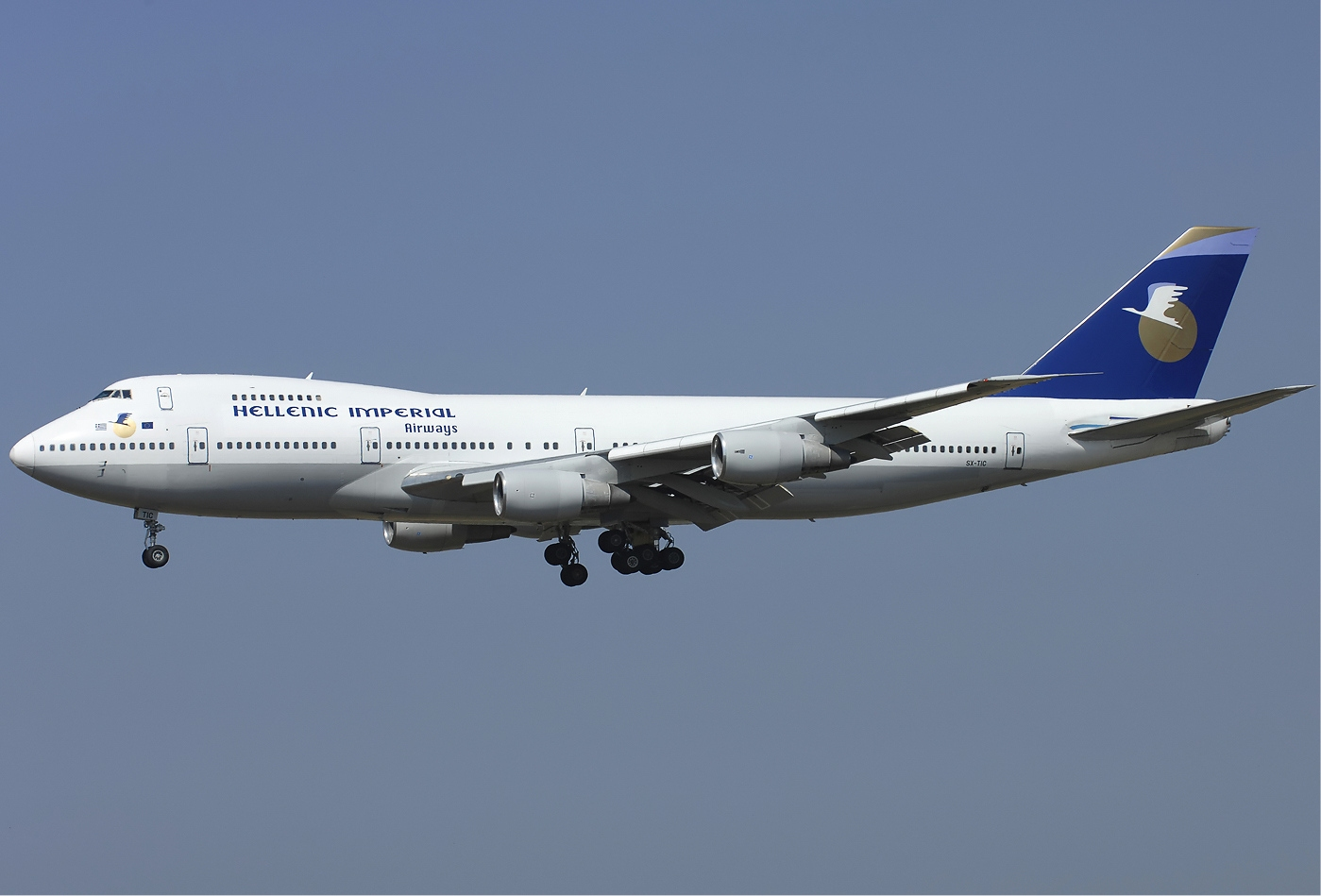
A Hellenic Imperial 747-200

The Hellenic Imperial Airways fleet consisted of the following aircraft:

Boeing 747-200B

- SX-TIB - Withdrawn from service 2012 & stored at Jakarta CGK
- SX-TID - Withdrawn from service 2012 & stored at Athens, sold to Iran Air in 2015; stored at ATH (LGAV) demolished 2025.
- SX-TIE - Withdrawn from services 2012 reportedly stored at Karachi
- SX-TIC - Withdrawn from service 2012 & stored at Athens, sold to Iran Air 2015 and ferried to THR
- D-ABZD - Never entered services with Hellenic Imperial & stored without titles or engines at Pinal Airpark, U.S. in partial livery

Airbus A340-300

- SX-TIF - Former Gulf Air A9C-LG, noted 2012 at Chateauroux, France in full livery. Aircraft Not taken up (financial issues)
- SX-TIG - Former Gulf Air A9C-LH, noted at 2012 Chateauroux, France in full livery. Aircraft Not taken up (financial issues)

Airbus A321-200

- F-WTAV - Former Gulf Air A9C-ET, noted at 2012 Montpellier, France Aircraft Not taken up (financial issues)
- F-WTAX - Former Gulf Air A9C-ES, noted at 2012 Montpellier, France. Aircraft Not taken up (financial issues)

The airline's failure to secure leases on the Airbus A340-300 aircraft saw the Boeing 747-200B operate services to New York JFK and a subsequent loss in operating revenues and eventual closure of the company. The Airbus A321 aircraft were to operate services to London, Kuwait, Dubai, Damascus, etc. The entire Boeing 747-200B fleet and all the airlines assets include offices in Athens were abandoned by 2012.
