= Athens Pirates =

Information
- Ballpark: Hellinikon Oylimpic Stadium
- Founded: 1992

The Athens Pirates was an amateur baseball club in Greece, playing in the Greek Baseball league. They used the 10,000 capacity Hellinikon Stadium for home games.

The club was founded in 1992 and played till 2014 when the baseball league was closed down by the government due to low number of active clubs.
