= Elliniko =

Suburban town in greater Athens, Greece

Elliniko Ελληνικό
- Municipal unit
- Location within South Athens regional unit

- Location within Greece
- Coordinates: 37°52′N 23°44′E
- Country: Greece
- Administrative region: Attica
- Regional unit: South Athens
- Municipality: Elliniko-Argyroupoli

Area
  - Municipal unit: 7.127 km^{2} (2.752 sq mi)
- Elevation: 5 m (16 ft)

Population (2021)
  - Municipal unit: 16,715
  - Municipal unit density: 2,345/km^{2} (6,074/sq mi)
- Time zone: UTC+2 (EET)
  - Summer (DST): UTC+3 (EEST)
- Postal code: 167 xx
- Area code: 210
- Vehicle registration: Z
- Website: elliniko-argyroupoli.gr

Elliniko (Greek: Ελληνικό), sometimes still referred to in English by its former name Hellinikon (Katharevousa: Ἑλληνικόν), is a southern suburban town in the Athens agglomeration in Attica, Greece. Since the 2011 local government reform, it has been part of the municipality of Elliniko-Argyroupoli, of which it is a municipal unit. Elliniko is known for the former Hellinikon Olympic Complex, a temporary sporting complex built on the grounds of the former Ellinikon International Airport and used for the 2004 Summer Olympics and the 2004 Summer Paralympics.

Elliniko is the site of a major development project for coastal Athens beginning in 2020 and due for completion in 2026—the Ellinikon Metropolitan Park, consisting of luxury homes, hotels, a casino, a marina, shops, offices, and Greece's tallest buildings such as the Riviera Tower and the Hard Rock Hotel & Casino Athens, which will be the first integrated resort in Greece.

== History ==
In 1922 after the Greco-Turkish War, many refuges, especially from the Sürmene town of Pontus, settled in the northernmost area of Elliniko, which was subsequently named Sourmena (Σούρμενα). In 1947, as a sign of the United States' involvement in the Greek Civil War, the US Air Force established an air base in Elliniko, which continued operating until 1993.

== Geography ==
Elliniko is situated near the Saronic Gulf coast, 10 km (6.2 mi) south of Athens city centre, in the Athens Riviera. The municipality has an area of 7.127 km^{2} (2.752 sq mi). The former airport is in the western part of the municipal unit, near the coast. Most of the residential area is in the eastern part, east of the former airport. The northern part of the airport has been converted to a sports complex. There are plans to convert the remaining part into a park.

Elliniko is well connected to the centre of Athens through a new line of the Athens metro (Elliniko station). The Athens Tram serves the coastal part of Elliniko.

=== Climate ===
According to the data provided by the Hellenic National Meteorological Service, Elliniko, like much of the southern suburbs of Athens, has an average annual temperature of 18.6 °C (65.5 °F) and receives 366.5 mm (14.43 in) of precipitation per year thus it marginally falls into the BSh hot semi-arid climate category with strong Mediterranean influences (Csa) according to the Köppen climate classification. The highest temperature recorded is 43.0 °C (109 °F) on August 3, 2021, while the lowest is −4.2 °C (24.4 °F) on 18 February 2008. The highest minimum temperature of 31.7 °C (89 °F) was recorded on July 26, 2025., while the lowest maximum temperature ever recorded is −0.2 °C (32 °F) on 13 February 2004, which constitutes the only ice day for the area since records begun in 1955. Fog is rare, while thunderstorms occur sparsely throughout the year. Snowfall is not very common, though it occurs almost every year, but it rarely causes severe disruption to daily life.

Climate data for Elliniko, coastal Athens (1955–2010), Extremes (1957–present), 28 m asl
Month	Jan	Feb	Mar	Apr	May	Jun	Jul	Aug	Sep	Oct	Nov	Dec	Year
Record high °C (°F)	22.4 (72.3)	24.2 (75.6)	27.0 (80.6)	30.9 (87.6)	35.6 (96.1)	40.0 (104.0)	42.2 (108.0)	43.0 (109.4)	37.2 (99.0)	35.2 (95.4)	28.6 (83.5)	22.9 (73.2)	43.0 (109.4)
Mean daily maximum °C (°F)	13.6 (56.5)	14.1 (57.4)	15.9 (60.6)	19.6 (67.3)	24.4 (75.9)	29.2 (84.6)	32.2 (90.0)	32.2 (90.0)	28.3 (82.9)	23.4 (74.1)	18.8 (65.8)	15.1 (59.2)	22.2 (72.0)
Daily mean °C (°F)	10.3 (50.5)	10.6 (51.1)	12.4 (54.3)	16.1 (61.0)	20.9 (69.6)	25.6 (78.1)	28.3 (82.9)	28.2 (82.8)	24.3 (75.7)	19.6 (67.3)	15.4 (59.7)	11.9 (53.4)	18.6 (65.5)
Mean daily minimum °C (°F)	7.0 (44.6)	7.1 (44.8)	8.5 (47.3)	11.5 (52.7)	15.8 (60.4)	20.3 (68.5)	23.0 (73.4)	23.1 (73.6)	19.6 (67.3)	15.7 (60.3)	12.0 (53.6)	8.8 (47.8)	14.4 (57.9)
Record low °C (°F)	−2.9 (26.8)	−4.2 (24.4)	−2.0 (28.4)	0.6 (33.1)	8.0 (46.4)	11.4 (52.5)	15.5 (59.9)	16.0 (60.8)	10.4 (50.7)	3.0 (37.4)	1.4 (34.5)	−2.0 (28.4)	−4.2 (24.4)
Average rainfall mm (inches)	47.7 (1.88)	38.5 (1.52)	42.3 (1.67)	25.5 (1.00)	14.3 (0.56)	5.4 (0.21)	6.3 (0.25)	6.2 (0.24)	12.3 (0.48)	45.9 (1.81)	60.1 (2.37)	62.0 (2.44)	366.5 (14.43)
Average rainy days	12.9	11.4	11.3	9.3	6.4	3.6	1.7	1.6	4.7	8.6	10.9	13.5	95.9
Average relative humidity (%)	69.3	68.0	65.9	62.2	58.2	51.8	46.6	46.8	54.0	62.6	69.2	70.4	60.4
Mean monthly sunshine hours	130.2	134.4	182.9	231.0	291.4	336.0	362.7	341.0	276.0	207.7	153.0	127.1	2,773.4
Source 1: HNMS (1955–2010 normals)
Source 2: Deutscher Wetterdienst (Extremes 1961–1990), Info Climat (Extremes 1991–present)

Climate data for Elliniko, 28 m asl (1991-2020)
Month	Jan	Feb	Mar	Apr	May	Jun	Jul	Aug	Sep	Oct	Nov	Dec	Year
Mean daily maximum °C (°F)	13.3 (55.9)	14.1 (57.4)	16.5 (61.7)	20.3 (68.5)	25.2 (77.4)	30.4 (86.7)	33.2 (91.8)	33.5 (92.3)	29.0 (84.2)	23.9 (75.0)	18.8 (65.8)	14.6 (58.3)	22.7 (72.9)
Mean daily minimum °C (°F)	6.9 (44.4)	7.1 (44.8)	8.8 (47.8)	11.8 (53.2)	16.1 (61.0)	20.7 (69.3)	23.5 (74.3)	23.8 (74.8)	20.1 (68.2)	16.2 (61.2)	12.1 (53.8)	8.8 (47.8)	14.7 (58.4)
Average precipitation mm (inches)	48.0 (1.89)	44.2 (1.74)	43.0 (1.69)	27.6 (1.09)	17.0 (0.67)	10.0 (0.39)	9.1 (0.36)	3.3 (0.13)	19.4 (0.76)	34.2 (1.35)	66.6 (2.62)	60.4 (2.38)	382.8 (15.07)
Source: Info Climat (Averages 1991–2020),

== Economy ==
Hellenic Imperial Airways had its head office in Elliniko. The Greek Civil Aviation Authority also has its head office in Elliniko. Elliniko is also home for the Greek national weather agency (ΕΜΥ).

== Sports ==
Hellinikon Olympic Complex is located in Elliniko. It was built for the staging of the 2004 Summer Olympics and consists of five venues. Elliniko also houses the basketball club Elliniko-Sourmena B.C. with many achievements in women's basketball.

== Historical population ==
Year	Population
1981	11,498
1991	13,517
2001	16,740
2011	17,259
2021	16,715

== See also ==
- List of municipalities of Attica
