= Hellenic National Meteorological Service =

Meteorological service of Greece

- Εθνική Μετεωρολογική Υπηρεσία

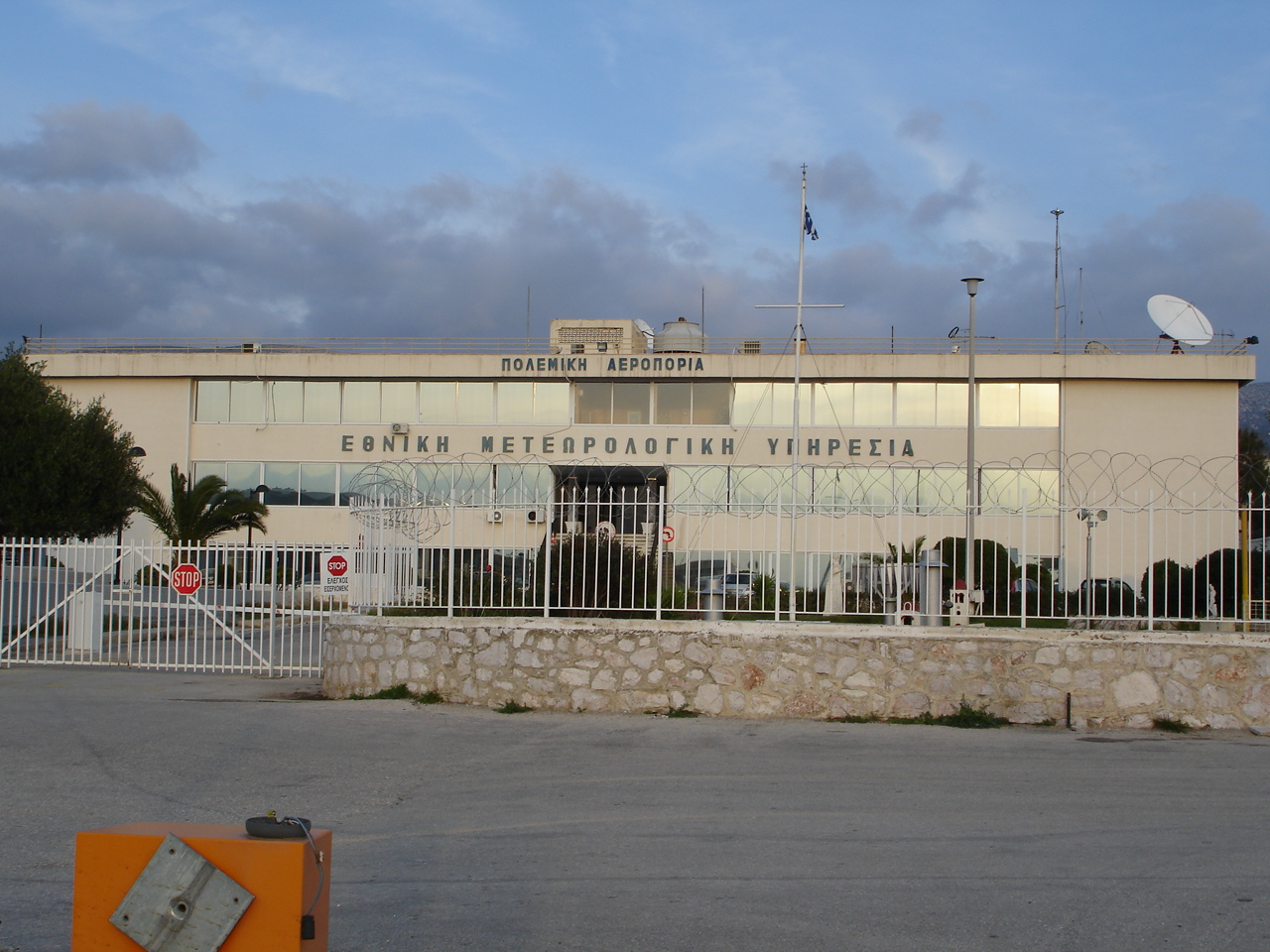
- Headquarters

Meteorological Agency overview
- Formed: 1931
- Jurisdiction: Hellenic Air Force
- Headquarters: Elliniko, Athens, Greece; 37°52′N 23°44′E
- Employees: 565
- Meteorological Agency executive: Brigadier-general (MT) Athanasios Gatopoulos, Commander
- Website: www.emy.gr

The Hellenic National Meteorological Service (HNMS) (Greek: Εθνική Μετεωρολογική Υπηρεσία (ΕΜΥ)) is a government agency responsible for making weather forecasts and observations for Greece. HNMS was founded in 1931 under the Ministry of Aviation and its mission was to cover all the meteorological and climatological needs of the country. It is based at the former Athens International Airport at Elliniko, and operates under the auspices of the Hellenic Air Force, staffed by both military and civilian personnel.

== Description ==
Among the primary goals of the HNMS is the weather forecast. At the same time, it also provides valuable information on weather and climate, state services, transport, agriculture, sport, etc.

HNMS employs approximately 565 people, in its main building at Elliniko and in branches throughout Greece, as its weather network covers almost the entire country. The class "A" meteorologists are officers from the Hellenic Air Force Academy and civilians from universities formed in meteorology, physics, mathematics and IT. Additional military and civilian personnel of other specialties (administrative, financial, technical, weather observation) complete the staff.

HNMS cooperates with the national weather services of other countries in exchange of meteorological observations, meteorological satellite data, weather radar information, etc. It is part of EUMETNET, EUMETSAT and World Meteorological Organization (WMO).

== History ==
HNMS was founded in 1931 under the new Ministry of Aviation to provide meteorological support for national defence and the economy. Originally built upon the network established by the National Observatory of Athens (1890), the service joined the International Meteorological Organization in 1935, and joined the World Meteorological Organization in 1949.
