= Ellinikon Metropolitan Park =

Planned urban development in Athens

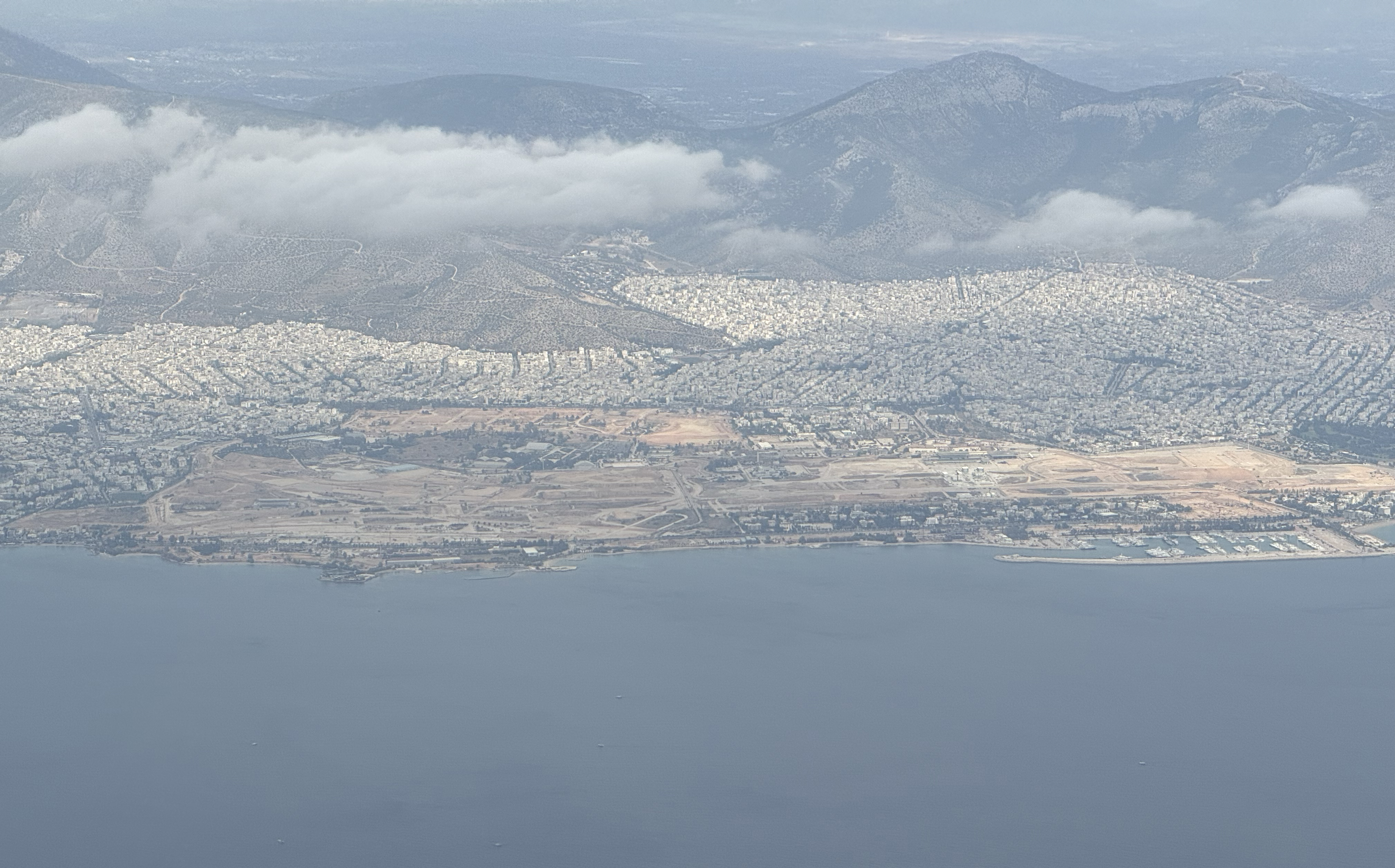
- The under construction park as seen in May 2024.
- Interactive map of Ellinikon Metropolitan Park
- Location: Elliniko
- Coordinates: 37.8865°N 23.7414°E
- Area: Athens, Elliniko-Argyroupoli
- Public transit: Elliniko
- Website: theellinikon.com.gr

The Ellinikon Metropolitan Park (also called "the Ellinikon") is an urban development under construction in Elliniko, Athens, Greece, on the site of the former Ellinikon International Airport.

It is to include a park as well as luxury homes, hotels, a casino, a marina, shops, and offices and will have Greece's tallest buildings reaching up to 200 metres (660 ft) in height. Construction had been scheduled to begin in 2008 and be completed by 2013, but the plans were shelved in the midst of the financial crisis. In July 2020, construction began on the Ellinikon redevelopment project. The Ellinikon Metropolitan Park and associated public spaces are being delivered in phases, with initial sections expected to open in 2026 and further works continuing thereafter. The Riviera Tower which is set to become Greece’s tallest building, is under construction and is projected to be completed in 2027. The Hard Rock Hotel & Casino Athens is also under development, with opening currently anticipated in 2027.

In September 2025, it was announced that ION Group would develop global R&D and Innovation campus, across two of the neighbourhoods of the Ellinikon, for €450 million.

== Outline ==
The park is planned to encompass 263 hectares, while another 100+ hectares will be used for housing and office facilities. It is to be one of the largest urban parks in Europe, surpassing London's Hyde Park (250 hectares). The Riviera Tower and Hard Rock Hotel & Casino Athens will be the tallest buildings in the development reaching 200 metres in height, becoming the tallest buildings in Southeastern Europe.

== History ==
In 2005, an international team led by architects David Serero, Elena Fernandez and landscape architect Philippe Coignet won the international competition to design a metropolitan park on the former site of the Hellenikon Airport, over more than 300 teams of architects.

The competition was sponsored by UIA (International Union of Architects), the Greek Ministry of Environment and the Organization for the Planning and Environmental Protection of Athens (ORSA). The project was further developed in 2006 and 2007 by this team through two development phases with the planning organizations of Athens.

Serero's team developed a strategy to landscape and urbanize the 530 hectares of the Hellenikon site by using natural running water patterns on the site as a concept to design the largest sustainable park in Europe. The water used by the park is effectively originating up to 80% of water collected naturally on the site. The project is structured by seven north–south green valleys that are called "Softscapes". The "Softscapes" are irrigated corridors that channel and collect rainwater of the site and from the water catchment basin of the surrounding hills. These strips integrate a playful work on artificial topography that both guides the water and create terraces and slopes for the park activities and programs. There will also be some MTB downhill tracks, like the ones on Imittos mountain.

In 2013, a version of design for the park was submitted as part of The Hellinikon Project. The team included Foster & Partners, Charles Anderson Landscape Architecture, ARUP and a large group of Greece design consultants. The design was revised and resubmitted to the Greek government in 2018. In July 2020, work began on the project.

In 2021, global design firm Sasaki was appointed to redesign the park and submit the revised design for permitting and construction. Demolition of the existing site is currently underway as of April 2023 with construction of Phase 1 of the park estimated to be completed by early 2026.

As part of the redevelopment plans, a set of Olympic Airways airliners that had remained at the airport since its closure – a Boeing 747, Boeing 727, Boeing 737 and a BAC One-Eleven – were acquired by Lamda Development, with the intention to preserve them and place them on display at the park.

== Climate ==
According to the data provided by the Hellenic National Meteorological Service, Elliniko, like much of the southern suburbs of Athens, has an average annual temperature of 18.6 °C (65.5 °F) and receives 366.5 mm (14.43 in) of precipitation per year thus it marginally falls into the BSh hot semi-arid climate category with strong Mediterranean influences (Csa) according to the Köppen climate classification. The highest temperature recorded is 43.0 °C (109 °F) on August 3, 2021, while the lowest is −4.2 °C (24.4 °F) on 18 February 2008. Fog is rare, while thunderstorms occur sparsely throughout the year. Snowfall is not very common, though it occurs almost every year, but it rarely causes severe disruption to daily life, in contrast to the northern parts of Athens, such as Kifisia.

Climate data for Elliniko, 28 m asl (1991–2020)
Month	Jan	Feb	Mar	Apr	May	Jun	Jul	Aug	Sep	Oct	Nov	Dec	Year
Mean daily maximum °C (°F)	13.3 (55.9)	14.1 (57.4)	16.5 (61.7)	20.3 (68.5)	25.2 (77.4)	30.4 (86.7)	33.2 (91.8)	33.5 (92.3)	29.0 (84.2)	23.9 (75.0)	18.8 (65.8)	14.6 (58.3)	22.7 (72.9)
Mean daily minimum °C (°F)	6.9 (44.4)	7.1 (44.8)	8.8 (47.8)	11.8 (53.2)	16.1 (61.0)	20.7 (69.3)	23.5 (74.3)	23.8 (74.8)	20.1 (68.2)	16.2 (61.2)	12.1 (53.8)	8.8 (47.8)	14.7 (58.4)
Average precipitation mm (inches)	48.0 (1.89)	44.2 (1.74)	43.0 (1.69)	27.6 (1.09)	17.0 (0.67)	10.0 (0.39)	9.1 (0.36)	3.3 (0.13)	19.4 (0.76)	34.2 (1.35)	66.6 (2.62)	60.4 (2.38)	382.8 (15.07)
Source: Info Climat (Averages 1991–2020), OGIMET

Climate data for Elliniko, coastal Athens (1955–2010), Extremes (1957–present), 28 m asl
Month	Jan	Feb	Mar	Apr	May	Jun	Jul	Aug	Sep	Oct	Nov	Dec	Year
Record high °C (°F)	22.4 (72.3)	24.2 (75.6)	27.0 (80.6)	30.9 (87.6)	35.6 (96.1)	40.0 (104.0)	42.2 (108.0)	43.0 (109.4)	37.2 (99.0)	35.2 (95.4)	28.6 (83.5)	22.9 (73.2)	43.0 (109.4)
Mean daily maximum °C (°F)	13.6 (56.5)	14.1 (57.4)	15.9 (60.6)	19.6 (67.3)	24.4 (75.9)	29.2 (84.6)	32.2 (90.0)	32.2 (90.0)	28.3 (82.9)	23.4 (74.1)	18.8 (65.8)	15.1 (59.2)	22.2 (72.0)
Daily mean °C (°F)	10.3 (50.5)	10.6 (51.1)	12.4 (54.3)	16.1 (61.0)	20.9 (69.6)	25.6 (78.1)	28.3 (82.9)	28.2 (82.8)	24.3 (75.7)	19.6 (67.3)	15.4 (59.7)	11.9 (53.4)	18.6 (65.5)
Mean daily minimum °C (°F)	7.0 (44.6)	7.1 (44.8)	8.5 (47.3)	11.5 (52.7)	15.8 (60.4)	20.3 (68.5)	23.0 (73.4)	23.1 (73.6)	19.6 (67.3)	15.7 (60.3)	12.0 (53.6)	8.8 (47.8)	14.4 (57.9)
Record low °C (°F)	−2.9 (26.8)	−4.2 (24.4)	−2.0 (28.4)	0.6 (33.1)	8.0 (46.4)	11.4 (52.5)	15.5 (59.9)	16.0 (60.8)	10.4 (50.7)	3.0 (37.4)	1.4 (34.5)	−2.0 (28.4)	−4.2 (24.4)
Average rainfall mm (inches)	47.7 (1.88)	38.5 (1.52)	42.3 (1.67)	25.5 (1.00)	14.3 (0.56)	5.4 (0.21)	6.3 (0.25)	6.2 (0.24)	12.3 (0.48)	45.9 (1.81)	60.1 (2.37)	62.0 (2.44)	366.5 (14.43)
Average rainy days	12.9	11.4	11.3	9.3	6.4	3.6	1.7	1.6	4.7	8.6	10.9	13.5	95.9
Average relative humidity (%)	69.3	68.0	65.9	62.2	58.2	51.8	46.6	46.8	54.0	62.6	69.2	70.4	60.4
Mean monthly sunshine hours	130.2	134.4	182.9	231.0	291.4	336.0	362.7	341.0	276.0	207.7	153.0	127.1	2,773.4
Source 1: HNMS (1955–2010 normals)
Source 2: Deutscher Wetterdienst (Extremes 1961–1990), Info Climat (Extremes 1991–present)

== See also ==
- Metropolitan Park (Queens) (a proposed park in New York City that would also include a Hard Rock-themed casino-hotel)
