= Riviera Tower =

Future skyscraper in Elliniko, Greece

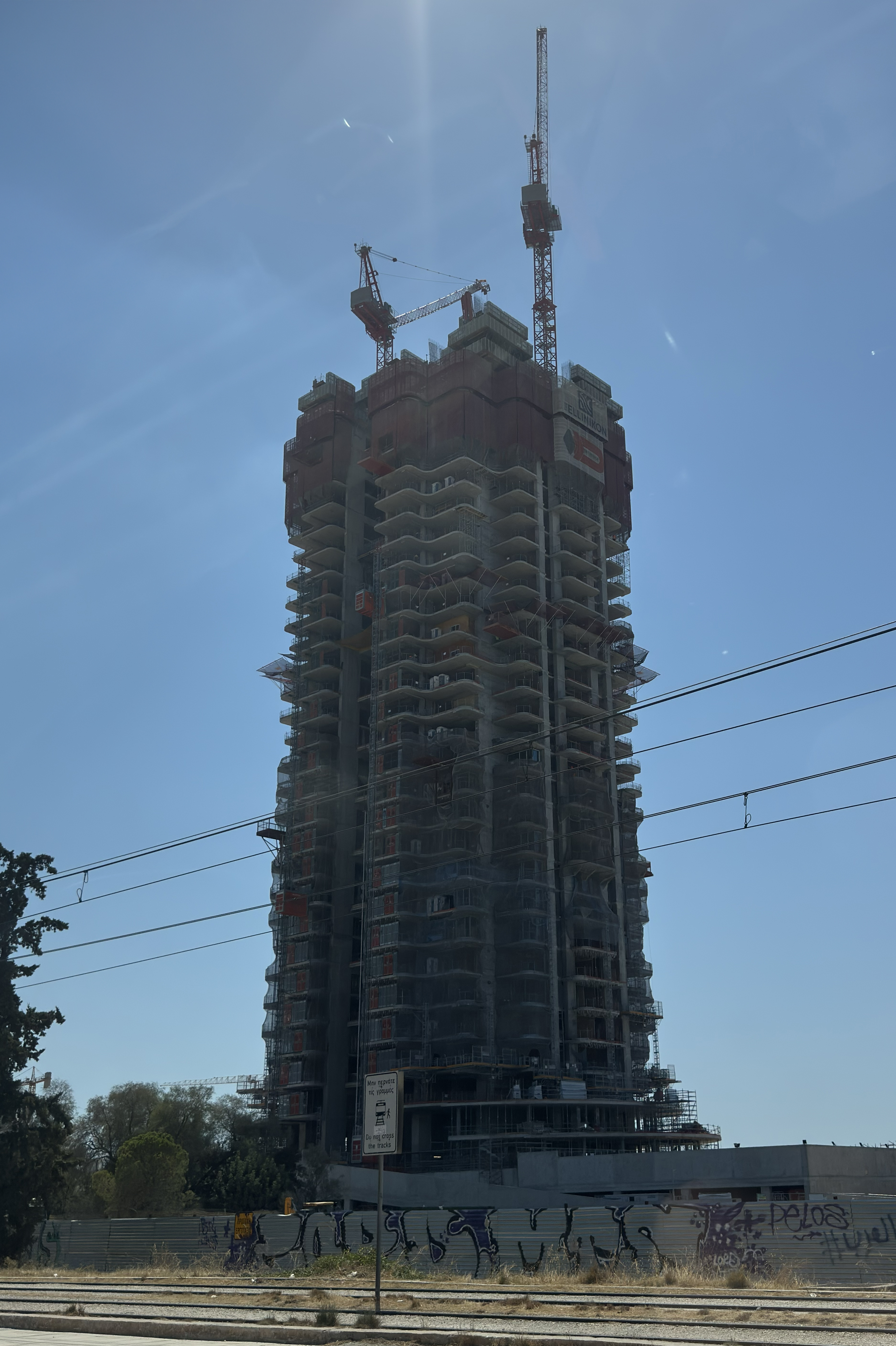
- Construction of Riviera Tower in 2025

General information
- Status: Topped-out
- Type: Residential
- Location: Elliniko, Athens, Greece
- Coordinates: 37.88284°N 23.72685°E
- Construction started: 2023
- Estimated completion: 2027

Height
- Roof: 200 m (660 ft)

Technical details
- Floor count: 51

Design and construction
- Architect: Foster + Partners
- Developer: Lamda Development
- Structural engineer: Buro Happold
- Main contractor: Bouygues-Aktor joint venture

Website
- theellinikonrivieratower.com

Riviera Tower, also known as Marina Tower or Ellinikon Tower, is a skyscraper currently under construction in the Athens Riviera, Greece. Located at the coastal district of Elliniko, it will be the tallest building in Greece at a height of 200 m (660 ft). The tower, designed by Foster + Partners, will host 90 flats on 50 floors when completed in 2026. It will feature green building characteristics and its developers aim for LEED Gold certification. The tower is a part of the Ellinikon Metropolitan Park.

== Background ==
The Riviera Tower is part of the redevelopment of the former Ellinikon International Airport, undertaken by the company Lamda Development. The plans for the skyscraper were presented online on July 7, 2021. The tower was designed by the international architectural firm "Foster+Partners", which collaborated with the "Alexandros N. Tombazis and Associates Architects S.A." design office. The engineering company Buro Happold undertook the structural studies in cooperation with Deta Engineering, and the electromechanical studies in cooperation with LDK Consultants S.A. & TEKEM S.A. The company Doxiadis+ was responsible for the landscaping design. The collaboration of Greek and foreign companies was due to the requirements set by the project's tender regarding experience and expertise. The building permit for the skyscraper was issued on August 9, 2022. On August 13, 2022, Lamda Development announced that three-quarters of the sellable area had been pre-sold, with estimated revenues of approximately 600 million euros.

Construction began in December 2022 with the installation of two 55-meter-long piles for the building's foundation, which began in January 2023. A total of 111 piles with a diameter of 1.5 meters were installed. The foundation was completed at the end of October 2023, with the placement of 7,500 cubic meters of concrete over 40 continuous hours.

Adjacent to the Riviera Tower will be the Hard Rock Hotel & Casino Athens, the first integrated resort in Greece.

== See also ==
- List of tallest buildings and structures in Greece
- List of tallest buildings in Europe
