= Hard Rock Hotel & Casino Athens =

Integrated resort under construction in Athens, Greece

Hard Rock Hotel & Casino Athens Ξενοδοχείο & Καζίνο Hard Rock στην Αθήνα (Greek)
- Interactive map of Hard Rock Hotel & Casino Athens; Ξενοδοχείο & Καζίνο Hard Rock στην Αθήνα (Greek)
- Location: Hellinikon Metropolitan Park Athens, Greece; 37.8865°N 23.7414°E
- Opened: 2027
- No. of rooms: 1,100
- Casino type: Resort
- Operating license holder: Hard Rock International

Hard Rock Hotel & Casino Athens (Greek: Ξενοδοχείο & Καζίνο Hard Rock στην Αθήνα) is an under construction integrated resort being built along the Athens Riviera in Athens, Greece.

== History ==
In 2022, Hard Rock International and GEK Terna partnered to develop an integrated resort in Greece. Construction on Hard Rock Hotel & Casino Athens began in 2024 and the resort is expected to be complete in 2027. The resort is located along the Athens Riviera at the site of the now-closed Ellinikon International Airport. The airport site was transformed into the Hellinikon Olympic Complex for the 2004 Summer Olympics. Following those games, venues located at that complex had fallen into a state of disrepair, with several being demolished. The site is being transformed into the Ellinikon Metropolitan Park. The Hard Rock Hotel & Casino and the Riviera Tower are amongst the two projects being developed at the new park. The resort will be the first integrated resort located in continental Europe.

== Features ==
The resort will feature a hotel with 1,100 guest rooms and will be 195 meters tall. Also featured at the resort will be a casino, shopping and dining options, convention space and a performance venue known as The Hard Rock Live Theatre. The performance venue will be able to accommodate up to 4,000 people. There will be 15 restaurants available within the resort. The casino will feature 150 table games and 1,500 slot machines.

== See also ==
- List of integrated resorts
- Hotel Mont Parnes
- City of Dreams Mediterranean
