= Ellinikon International Airport =

Airport serving Athens, Greece (1938–2001)

Ellinikon International Airport Διεθνής Αερολιμένας Ελληνικού
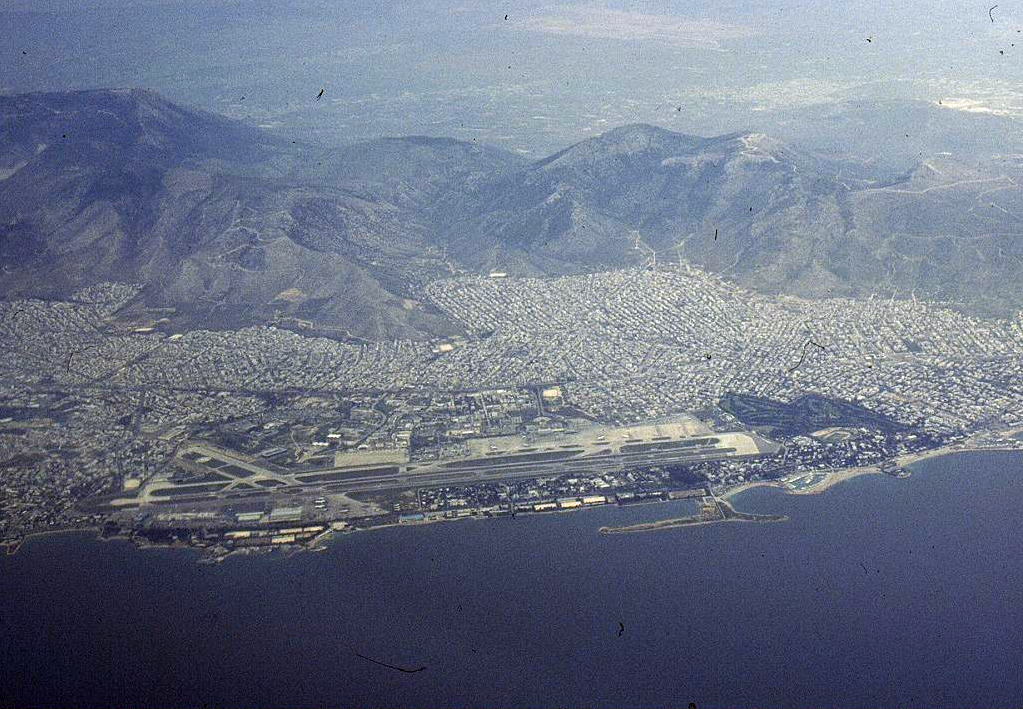
- Aerial view of the airport in 1998. The construction site on the top of the image is what would become the new Athens airport.
- IATA: ATH (Note: All civil traffic of this airport was moved to Eleftherios Venizelos Airport in 2001.); ICAO: LGAT

Summary
- Airport type: Defunct
- Owner: Hellinikon S.A.
- Serves: Athens
- Location: Elliniko, Athens, Greece
- Opened: 1938; 88 years ago
- Closed: 28 March 2001; 25 years ago
- Hub for: Olympic Airways
- Focus city for: Trans World Airlines
- Elevation AMSL: 21 m (69 ft)
- Coordinates: 37°53′54″N 23°43′46″E
- Website: www.hellinikon.com
- Interactive map of Ellinikon International Airport

Runways
| Direction | Length | | Surface |
| Direction | m | ft | Surface |
|---|---|---|---|
| 15L/33R | 3,500 | 11,483 | Asphalt (closed) |
| 15R/33L | 3,148 | 10,331 | Asphalt (closed) |
- The airport is closed to all aviation and has been transformed into an urban park.

Ellinikon International Airport (IATA: ATH, ICAO: LGAT); Greek: Διεθνής Αερολιμένας Ελληνικού, sometimes spelled Hellinikon, was an international airport that served Athens, Greece, from 1938 to 2001. The airport was located seven kilometres (4 1/2 miles) south of Athens, and just west of Glyfada. It was named after the village of Elliniko, now a suburb of Athens. The airport had an official capacity of 11 million passengers per year, but served 13.5 million passengers during its last year of operations. It was replaced on 28 March 2001 by the new Athens International Airport Eleftherios Venizelos. A large portion of the site was converted into a stadium and sports facilities for the 2004 Olympic Games.

The former airport is now the site of a major development for coastal Athens, which came under criticism because well-preserved historic buildings (from the 1930s) were demolished. In 2020, construction began on the Ellinikon Metropolitan Park, a complex consisting of luxury homes, hotels, a casino, the Inspire Athens tower, a marina, shops, and offices. The first phase is supposed to be ready in between 2027 and 2028.

The airport site is bordered by beaches to the west, by the Glyfada Golf Club to the south, by the Elliniko-Glyfada municipal boundary, and by a residential area. The Athens radar center is still based at Elliniko.

== History ==
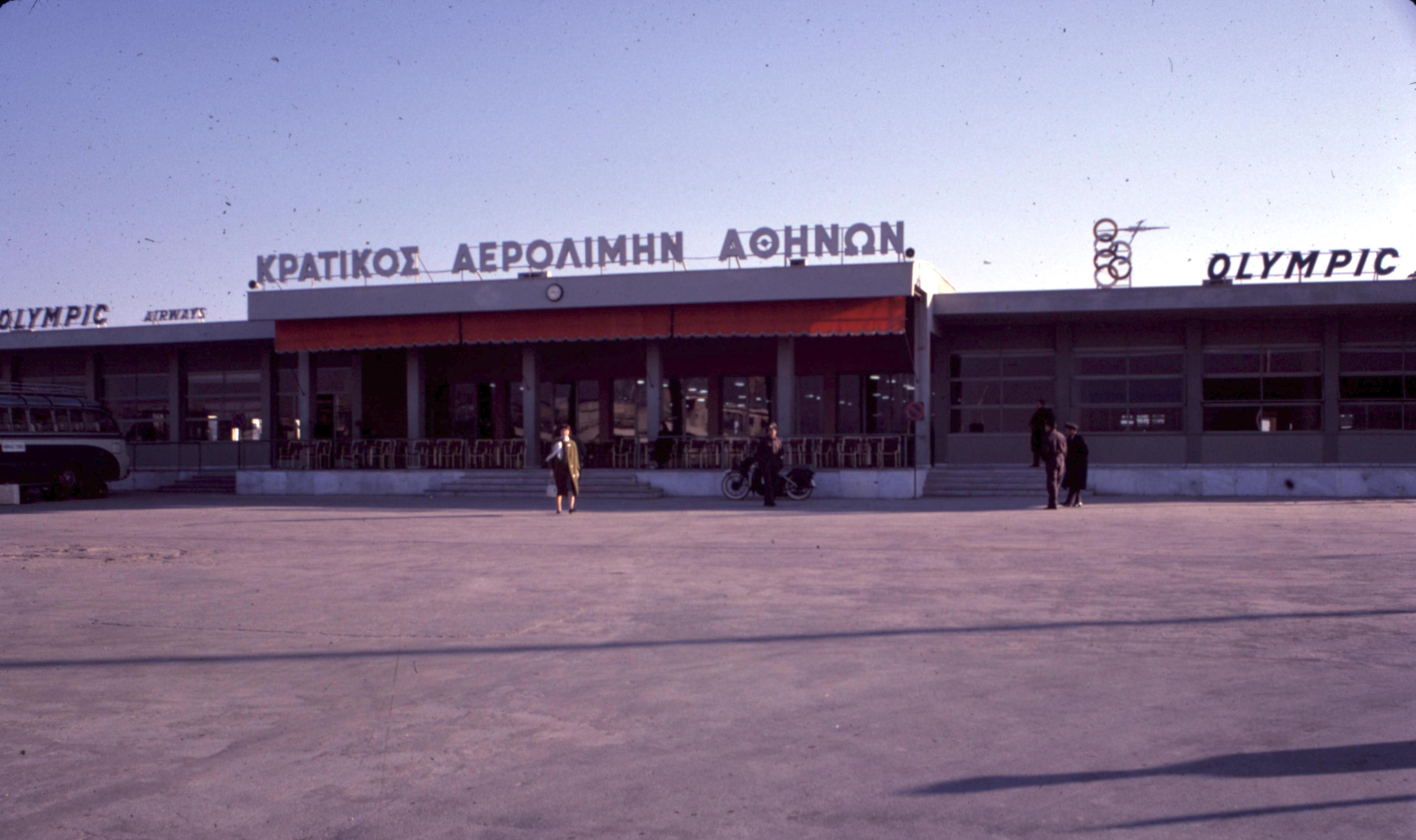
Athens Airport Terminal in 1961

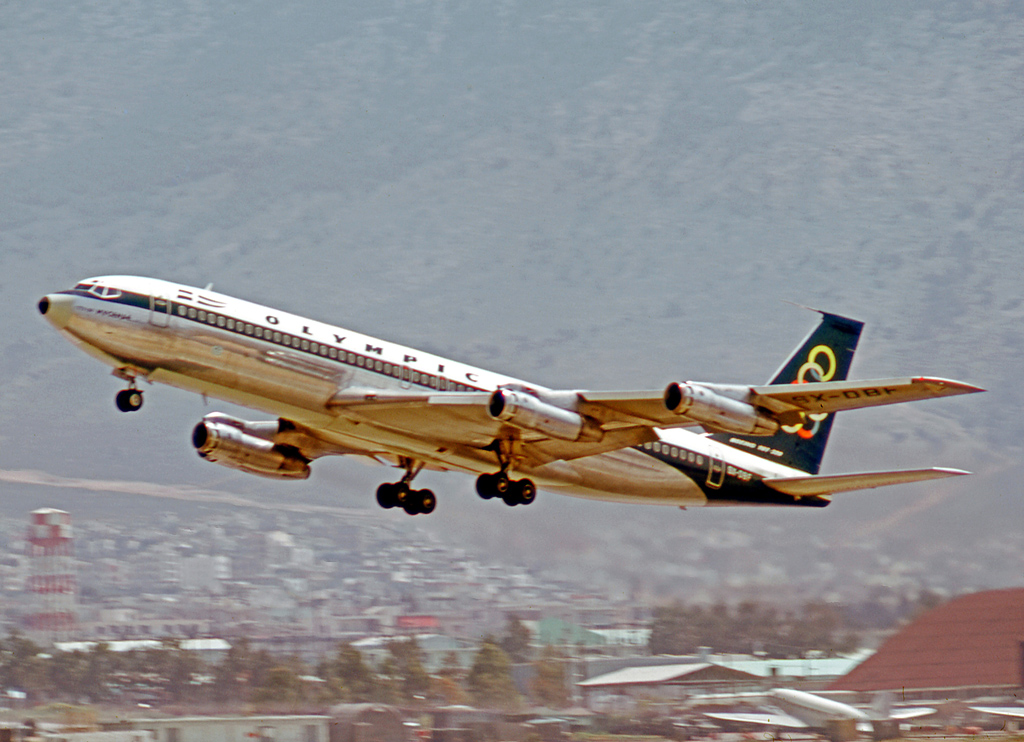
Olympic Airways Boeing 707 taking off from Ellinikon in 1973

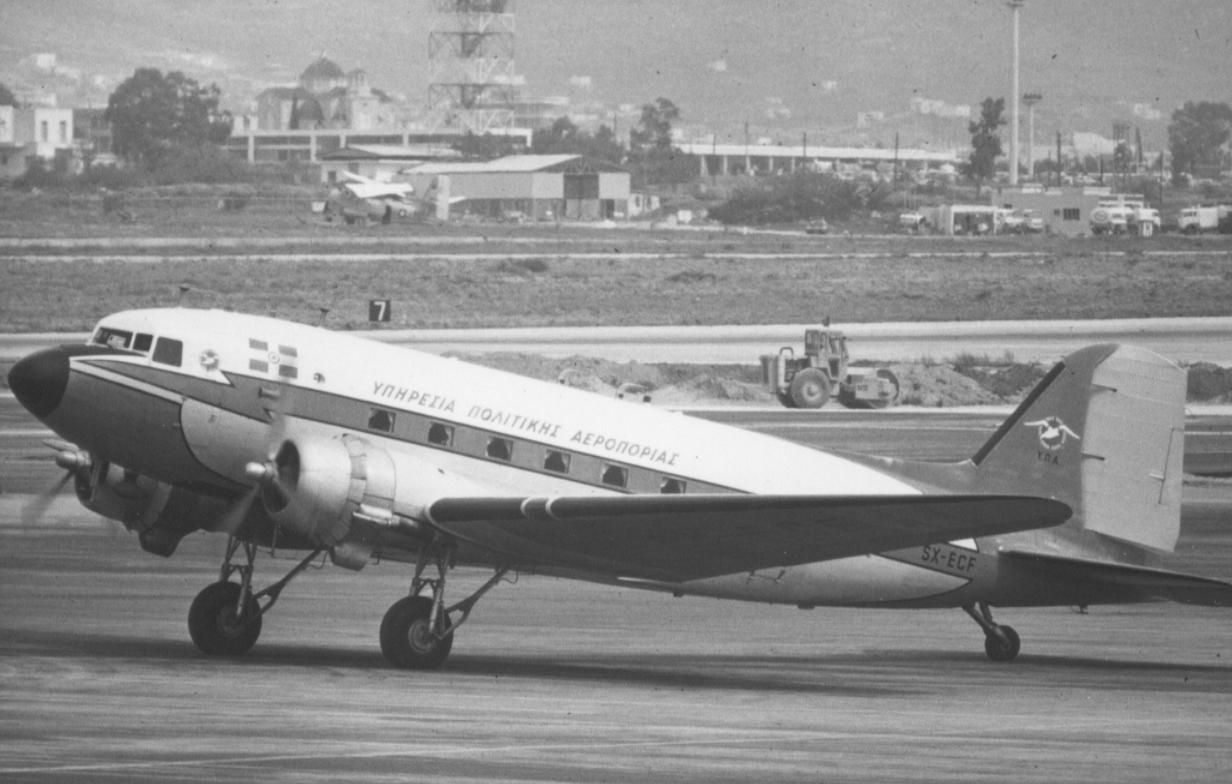
Douglas DC-3 of the Hellenic CAA at Ellinikon Airport in April 1973

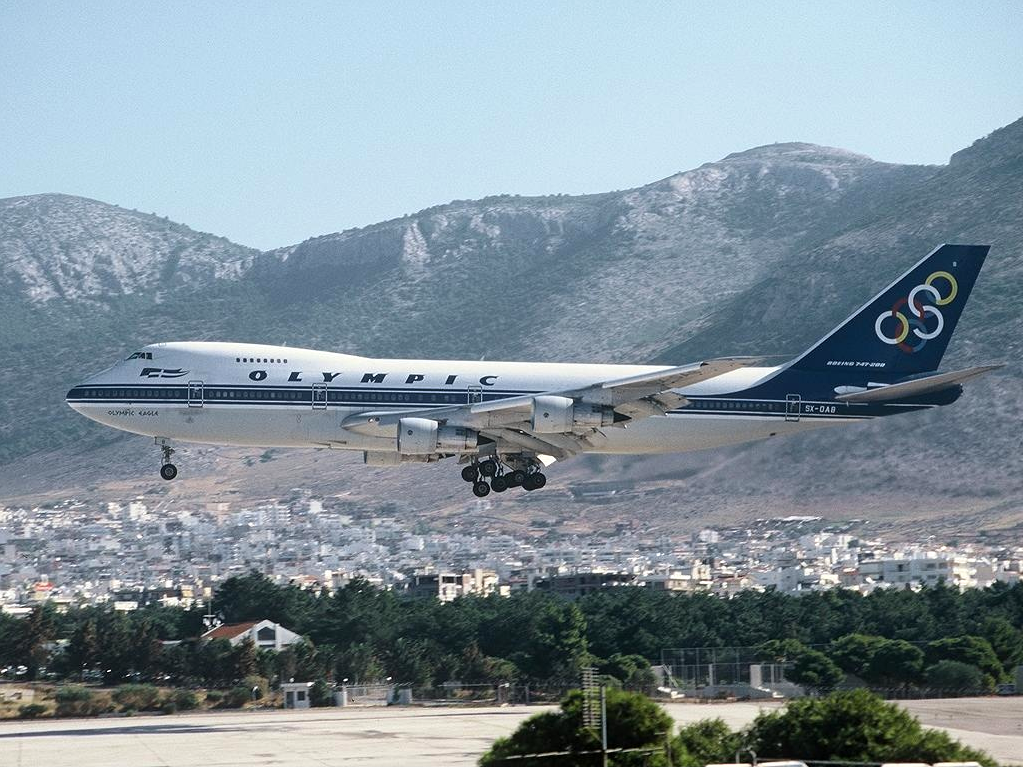
Olympic Airways Boeing 747-200B landing at the airport in 1996. This airframe - SX-OAB - was one of four abandoned aircraft that remained in place until some point between June 2022 and September 2024, when it was towed to a new location within the redevelopment project to be put on permanent display.

Built in 1938, Ellinikon International Airport was originally called Kalamaki Airfield. Following the German invasion of Greece in 1941, Kalamaki Airfield was used as a Luftwaffe air base during the occupation. After World War II, the Greek government allowed the United States to use the airport from 1945 until 1993. Known as Hassani Airport in 1945, it was used by the United States Army Air Forces (USAF) as early as 1 October 1945 as a base of operations for Air Transport Command flights between Rome, Italy, and points in the Middle East. By agreement with Greece, the USAF operated out of the airport for over four decades. In 1988, in one of the first projects for the eventual bid for the 1996 Summer Olympics, the Greek government decided not to renew the agreement, as technical and security issues prevented the airport's modernization and expansion. Additionally, it was considered one of the most difficult and risky airports in the world for take-offs and landings because of the natural characteristics of the region (a short and small runway on a narrow strip of flat land between the Aegean Sea and the mountains surrounding the Attiki basin, particularly Mt. Hymmetus. After the non-renewal of the agreement, a series of feasibility studies began on the possibility of a deactivation of the airport and the construction of a new one. Three years after the withdrawal of the agreement, the USAF concluded its operations after the end of the Gulf War.

The airport was the base of operations for the Greek national carrier Olympic Airways. The airport had two terminals: the West Terminal for Olympic Airways, and the East Terminal for all other carriers. The East Terminal building was designed between 1960 and 1969 by Finnish architect Eero Saarinen. Just before its closure in 2001, the airport recorded a 15.6% growth rate over its previous year, serving 13.5 million passengers per year and handling 57 airlines flying to 87 destinations. The airport's official capacity was 11 million passengers per year.

The airport was closed on 28 March 2001. The last aircraft to depart from Ellinikon was an Olympic Airways Boeing 737 bound for Thessaloníki. All flights were transferred to the new Athens International Airport, located 20 km east of the city in Spata.

== Redevelopment ==
A large part of the airport is still derelict, and old aircraft and airport vehicles can still be seen on the site. The site has been used as a camp for immigrants and refugees. The Civil Aviation Museum operated out of the West Terminal from April 2011 until 2018. The Olympic Airways Employees’ Cultural Center (POLKEOA) hopes to reopen a museum showcasing its collection of Olympic Airways memorabilia and aircraft.

=== 2004 Olympic Summer Games ===
After its closure, the northwest portion of the airport was redeveloped. Aprons were converted into a provisory Olympic complex that housed the 2004 Summer Olympics venues for canoe and kayak slalom, field hockey, baseball, and softball. Other Olympics-related upgrades to the airport included transforming one of the western hangars into the secondary arena for the basketball tournament and the fencing competition. During the 2004 Summer Paralympics, the arena hosted wheelchair fencing and sitting volleyball matches. The archery events, blind football, and CP football were held at the hockey and softball fields.

=== Ellinikon Metropolitan Park ===
In 2005, a team led by architects David Serero, Elena Fernandez, and landscape architect Philippe Coignet won a competition against over 300 teams of architects to design a metropolitan park on the former site of the Ellinikon Airport. The competition was sponsored by UIA (International Union of Architects), the Greek Ministry of Environment, and the Organization for the Planning and Environmental Protection of Athens (ORSA). The project was further developed in 2006 and 2007 by this team through two development phases with the planning organizations of Athens. By 2012, government plans to attract investors and develop the site commercially were eclipsing the proposed park, though nearby communities remained vocal about their preference for a park. There was also another plan to turn the airport into a coastal resort. The park will be the site of the Hard Rock Hotel & Casino Athens and the Riviera Tower. The Hard Rock Hotel & Casino will be the first integrated resort in Greece and the Riviera Tower will be a residential tower.

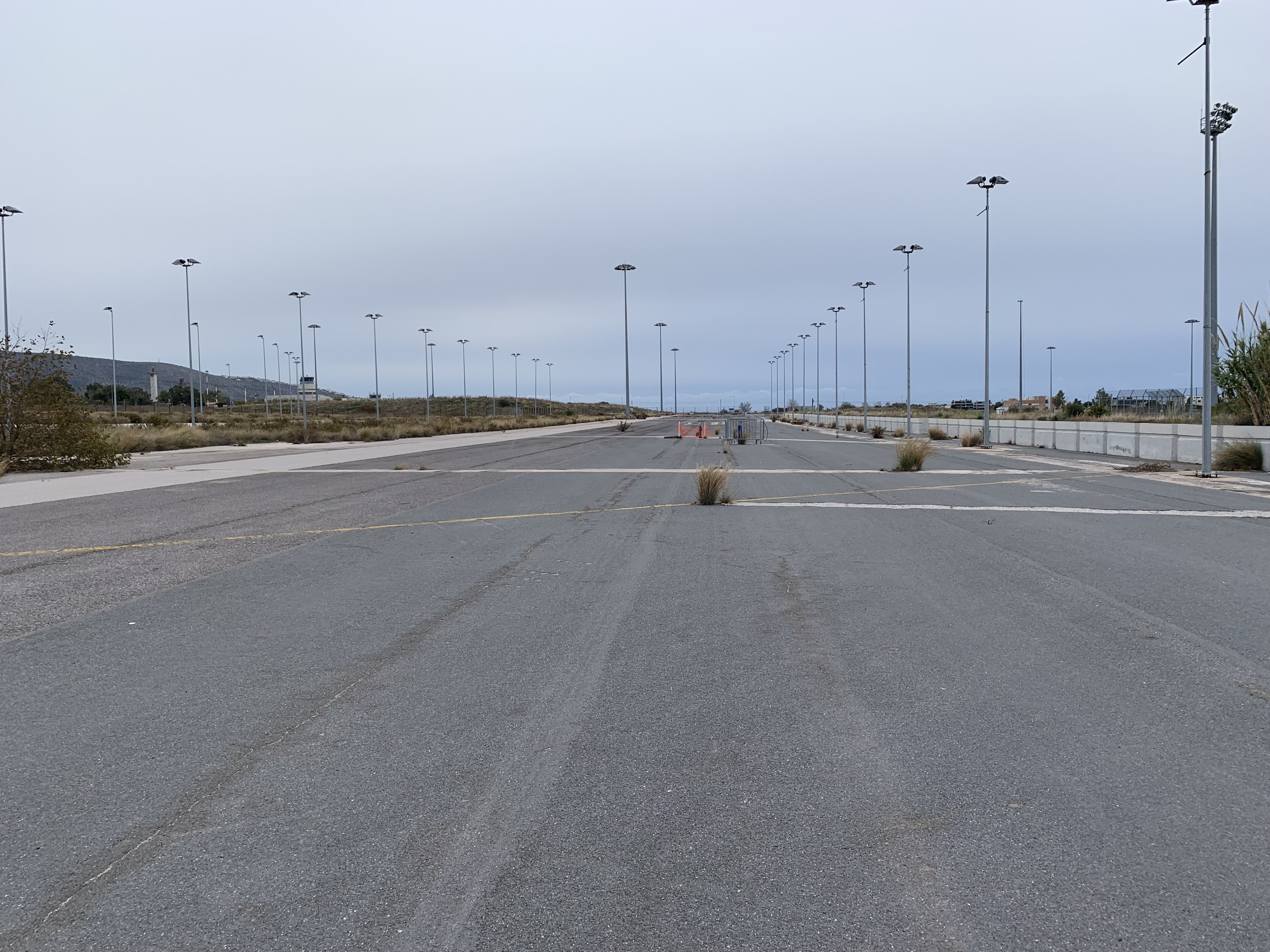
View of the abandoned runway in November 2018

== Accidents and incidents ==
The following is a list of aircraft accidents and incidents that occurred at or in the vicinity of Ellinikon airport. Only deadly occurrences or hull-losses are listed.

- 21 June 1959 – Following a tire burst upon landing, a fire erupted when debris ruptured the fuel lines of a Royal Canadian Air Force Canadair North Star (registration 17525) that was returning to Canada.
- 2 August 1961 – SAA Boeing 707-344 ZS-CKE scraped a wall and hit a tree during takeoff. After arriving in Nairobi, it was discovered substantial damage was present. The plane was repaired.
- 26 December 1968 – Two terrorists opened fire and threw grenades at El Al Flight 253, one passenger died.
- 8 December 1969 – Olympic Airways Flight 954, a Douglas DC-6 (tail number SX-DAE), crashed into Mount Paneio while on approach to the airport. All 90 passengers and crew on board died, making the accident the worst aviation disaster involving a DC-6.
- 21 October 1972 – An Olympic Airways NAMC YS-11A-500 (tail number SX-BBQ) that was operating a domestic scheduled Kerkyra–Athens passenger service crashed into the sea on approach to the airport in poor visibility. There were 53 people aboard, of whom 36 passengers and the co-pilot drowned, while 13 passengers and the remaining three crew members were rescued.
- 22 January 1973 – A Piaggio P.136L-2 amphibious plane (tail number SX-BDC) crashed shortly after takeoff from runway 33. The crash occurred as a result of the reversing of the aileron connecting cables during the installation of a new control column on the plane. Alexander Onassis, one of the aircraft's three passengers, died as a result of injuries sustained in the accident.
- 5 August 1973 – The 1973 Athens Hellinikon International Airport attack, in which two Palestinian militants claiming affiliation with the Black September Organization opened fire on a passenger lounge, killing three and wounding 55.
- 17 December 1973 – Stopover of hijacked Lufthansa Flight 303, a flight from Italy to Kuwait.
- 3 December 1975 – TMA Boeing 747-123F OD-AGC landed on runway 15 with just 5,000 feet of pavement remaining and applied thrust reversers late, causing the plane to go off the end of the runway and onto a public road. All 7 onboard survived and the plane was repaired.
- 9 August 1978 – Olympic Airways Flight 411, a Boeing 747, experienced an engine failure on takeoff but returned safely without passenger or crew injuries.
- 8 October 1979 – Swissair Flight 316, a Douglas DC-8-62 (registration HB-IDE), overran the runway on landing, inbound from Geneva. Both the port wing and the tail separated from the fuselage before the aircraft came to rest. A fire that broke, 14 of the 154 people on board died.
- 14 June 1985 – TWA Flight 847 was hijacked shortly after takeoff from Athens, and the passengers were held hostage for three days. One was murdered.
- 24 March 1992 – A Golden Star Air Cargo Boeing 707-320C (tail number ST-ALX) that was operating an Amsterdam-Athens cargo service, struck Mount Hymettus, 5.5 kilometres (3 1/2 miles) southeast of the airport, on a visual approach. There were seven reported fatalities.

== Climate ==
Elliniko has a hot semi-arid climate (BSh), closely bordering a Mediterranean climate (Csa) with hot, dry summers and cool, rainy winters.

Climate data for Athens, Elliniko, 10 m asl (1955-1997)
| Month | Jan | Feb | Mar | Apr | May | Jun | Jul | Aug | Sep | Oct | Nov | Dec | Year |
|---|---|---|---|---|---|---|---|---|---|---|---|---|---|
| Mean daily maximum °C (°F) | 13.6 (56.5) | 14.1 (57.4) | 15.7 (60.3) | 19.4 (66.9) | 24.1 (75.4) | 28.7 (83.7) | 31.8 (89.2) | 31.7 (89.1) | 28.2 (82.8) | 23.2 (73.8) | 18.8 (65.8) | 15.2 (59.4) | 22.0 (71.7) |
| Mean daily minimum °C (°F) | 7.0 (44.6) | 7.1 (44.8) | 8.4 (47.1) | 11.4 (52.5) | 15.8 (60.4) | 20.1 (68.2) | 22.8 (73.0) | 22.8 (73.0) | 19.6 (67.3) | 15.6 (60.1) | 12.0 (53.6) | 8.8 (47.8) | 14.3 (57.7) |
| Average precipitation mm (inches) | 48.3 (1.90) | 40.9 (1.61) | 39.7 (1.56) | 26.0 (1.02) | 15.2 (0.60) | 5.6 (0.22) | 5.2 (0.20) | 7.0 (0.28) | 9.6 (0.38) | 47.8 (1.88) | 55.4 (2.18) | 64.1 (2.52) | 364.8 (14.35) |
Source: Hellenic National Meteorological Service

== In popular culture ==
Ellinikon had been featured in several movie productions and music videos:

- A sequence of the 1986 Menahem Golan movie The Delta Force where one of the Lebanese terrorists exits a taxi was shot at Ellinikon's eastern terminal. The Athens airport interiors, however, were filmed in Terminal 1 of Ben Gurion Airport in Israel.
- The airbase is mentioned in the 1986 movie Iron Eagle by Chappy Sinclair in a taped message to Doug Masters shortly after Sinclair was shot down.
- The 2015 Christoforos Papakaliatis movie Worlds Apart used the East Terminal building and apron as a camp for refugees, as well as the exterior and interior of the abandoned Boeing 747-200 parked there.
- In 2018, the music video for "Tomame" by Greek pop star Eleni Foureira was partially filmed in the airport.
- The sci-fi short film Third Kind by Yorgos Zois is set in the airport, in the aftermath of the refugee crisis, where the belongings of the refugees are the props of the movie.
- In 2019, a challenge for the 2020 season of the Belgian reality TV show De Mol was filmed on the runway and apron.
- In 2020, the music video for "Paliopaido" by Greek pop star Josephine was partially filmed in the airport.

== See also ==
- List of airports in Greece
