= Hellinikon Olympic Softball Stadium =

Softball stadium in Athens, Greece

Coordinates: 37.8943°N 23.7278°E

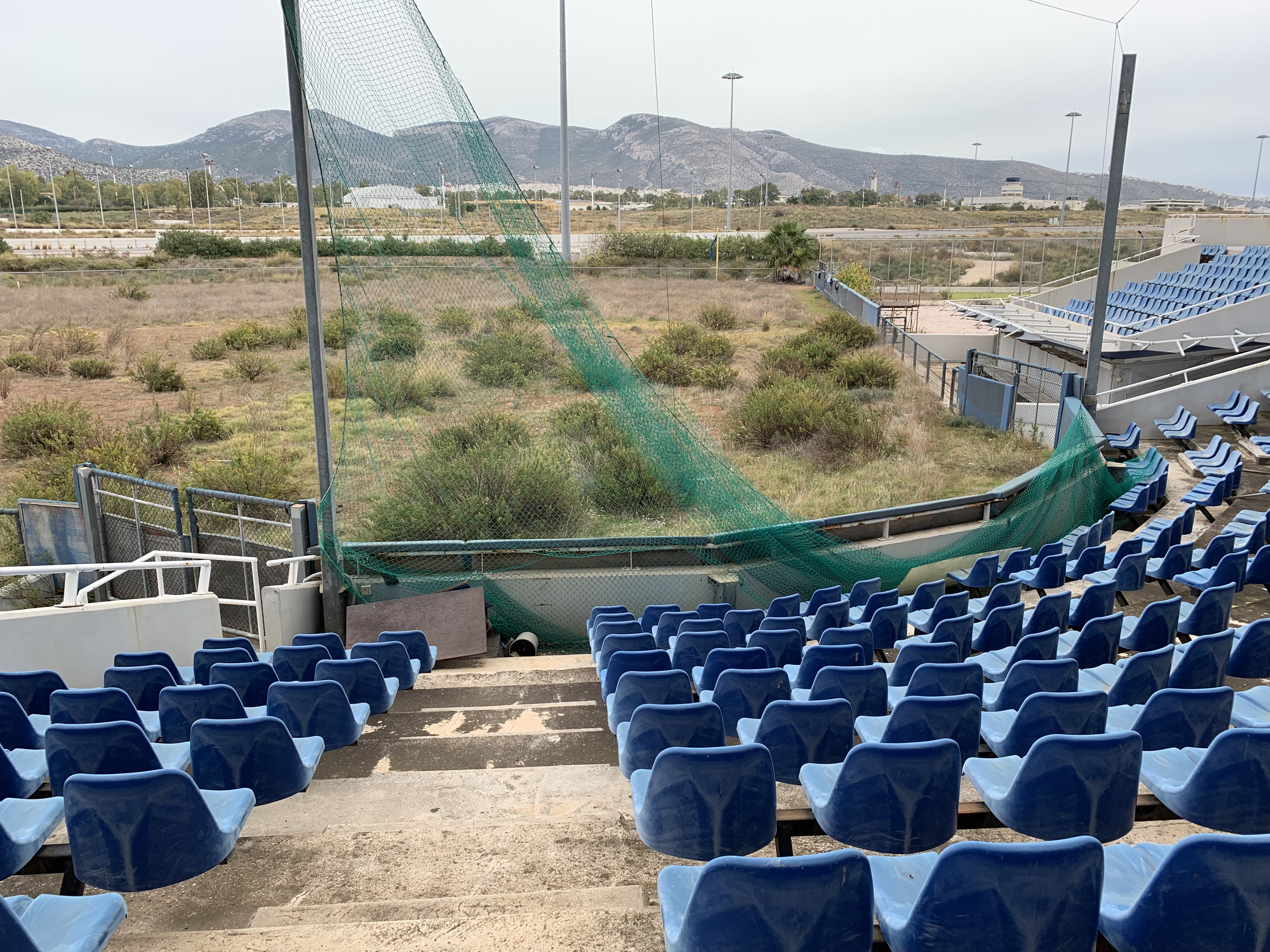
Abandoned 2004 Athens Softball Stadium in November 2018

The Hellinikon Olympic Softball Stadium is a softball stadium located in the Hellinikon Olympic Complex in Athens. It hosted the softball competitions during the 2004 Summer Olympics in Athens. The venue consists of a main softball field of 4,800 seats – though only 3,400 seats were made publicly available during the games – and two warm-up fields nearby. Construction on the facility was completed on 29 February 2004, and it was officially opened on 30 July 2004.

Softball however, has not been played at the stadium since the end of the 2004 Olympic Games. One minder of the stadium said in 2012, "The softball [stadium] is in perfect working order. It is not abandoned. It's just that nobody ever plays softball". The stadium has since fallen into disuse and disrepair.
