= David Serero (architect) =

French architect (born 1974)

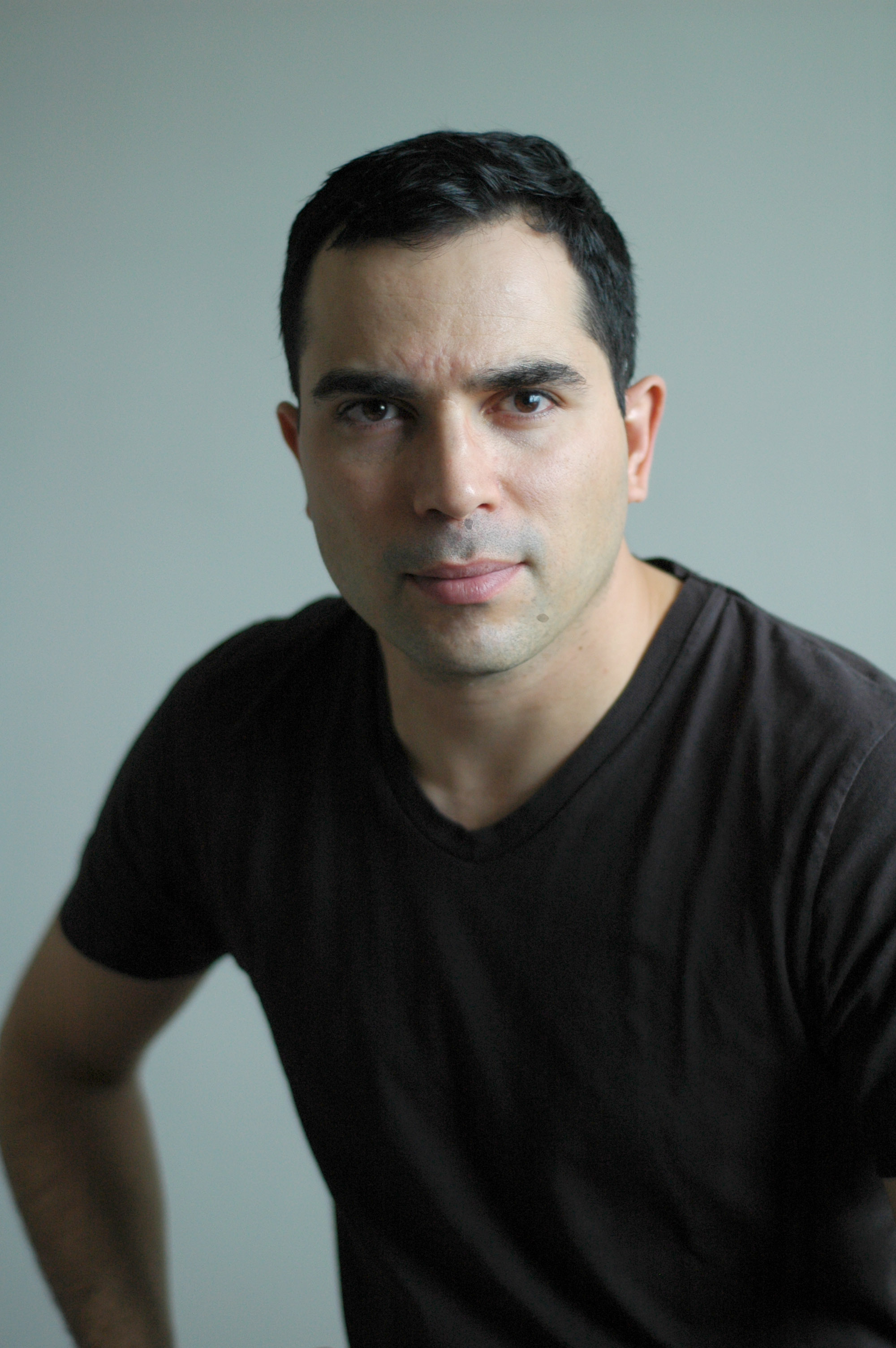
- Born: 2 February 1974 (age 52); Grenoble, France
- Occupation: Architect
- Awards: Rome Prize at the VILLA MEDICIS for the variable geometry acoustical domes (2004); NEXT GENERATION PRIZE for "Scale Orography", Open air Theater, by Metropolis Magazine, New York (2004); VII VENISE BIENNALE, Selected as part of the French pavilion exhibition (2002); YOUNG ARCHITECT AWARD, Architectural League de New York (2002); NOUVEAUX ALBUMS DES JEUNES ARCHITECTES (2002); FULBRIGHT SCHOLARSHIP, Franco-american Commission (1997)

David Serero is a French architect, who has worked on international projects in France, the United States, and Italy.

== Early life and education ==
Serero was born in 1974 in Grenoble. He graduated with a master's degree in Architecture and Urban Planning from Columbia University (New York) and with an Architecture Degree from École d’architecture Paris-Villemin. He lives and works in Paris and in New York.

== Career ==
In 2002, he was listed by Surface magazine as one of the top ten avant-garde designers. In 2002 he received the "Nouveaux albums des jeunes architectes français" award from the French Ministry for Culture, and the New York Young Architects award from the Architectural League of New York. In 2004, he received the Rome Prize from the French Academy in Rome (Villa Medicis).

Serero is an adjunct professor at the École d'Architecture Malaquais in Paris, where his research focuses on matters of structural morphology and the performance of building envelopes. He also lectured at New York Pratt Institute and at Columbia University and on architectural design studios and workshops in the USA, in France, Italy and Austria.

In 2000, Serero founded Serero Architects in New York.

== Notable projects ==
Year	Project	Location	Additional information
2004-2005	Glass Loft	New York, United States	
2004-2005	New York Center for the Art Studies	New York, United States	
2004-2012	Hellenikon Metropolitan Park	Athens, Greece	
2004-2005	Variability Geometry Acoustical Domes	Villa Médicis, Italy	
2005	Arcade Groupe Headquarters	France	
2006-2009	Archaeological Museum of Oise	Vendeuil-Caply	
2007-2011	Saint Cyprien Auditorium/Movie Theater	Sud Roussillon, France	Received commission but was not completed
2007-2010	Orcines Cultural Center	Orcines, France	
2008-2011	Technopole Innovia	Dole, France	
2009-2010	EuroAirport Basel Mulhouse Freiburg Business Center	Saint-Louis, France	Modifications
2009-2011	Place Des Saisons	La Defense, France	
2009-2012	University of Amiens Library	Amiens, France	
2010-2012	Saint-Hilaire Media Center	Saint-Hilaire-Du-Harcouet, France	
2010-2013	Meudon Cultural Center	Meudon, France	
2011-2013	Job Center in Nantes	France	
2011-2013	Cultural Center in Epinay-Sous-Sénart	France	
2011-2014	Museum of the Fromelles Fight	France	
