= List of Summer Olympics venues: F–G =

For the Summer Olympics, there were 21 venues starting with the letter 'F' and 19 starting with the letter 'G'.

== F ==
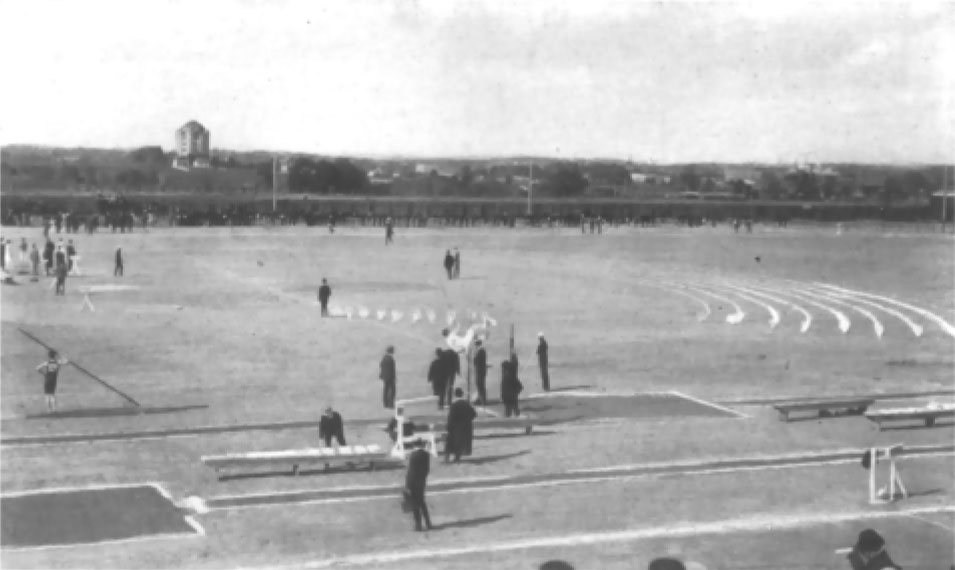
Francis Field during the 1904 Summer Olympics. It hosted 11 sports during those games.

Venue	Games	Sports	Capacity	Ref.
Fairbanks Ranch Country Club	1984 Los Angeles	Equestrian (eventing endurance)	50,000	
Fairfield City Farm	2000 Sydney	Cycling (mountain biking)	20,000	
Faliro Olympic Beach Volleyball Centre	2004 Athens	Volleyball (beach)	8,000	
Faliro Sports Pavilion Arena	2004 Athens	Handball, Taekwondo	10,000	
Fältrittklubben	1912 Stockholm	Equestrian (eventing endurance)	Not listed.	
Fencing Hall	2004 Athens	Fencing	8,000	
Fengtai Softball Field	2008 Beijing	Softball	13,000	
Fernando Montes de Oca Fencing Hall	1968 Mexico City	Fencing, Modern pentathlon (fencing)	3,000	
Finchley Lido	1948 London	Water polo	Not listed.	
Flamengo Park	2016 Rio de Janeiro	Athletics (walks), Cycling (road)	5,000	
Florence Communal Stadium	1960 Rome	Football	47,920	
Florida Citrus Bowl	1996 Atlanta	Football	65,000	
Fontainebleau	1924 Paris	Modern pentathlon (riding)	Not listed.	
Fonte Nova Stadium	2016 Rio de Janeiro	Football	55,000	
Forest Park	1904 St. Louis	Diving, Swimming, Water Polo	Not listed.	
Fort Copacabana	2016 Rio de Janeiro	Marathon swimming, Triathlon	5,000	
Francis Field	1904 St. Louis	Archery, Athletics, Cycling, Football, Gymnastics, Lacrosse, Roque, Tennis, Tug of war, Weightlifting, and Wrestling	19,000.	
Francis Gymnasium	1904 St. Louis	Boxing, Fencing.	Not listed.	
Francisco Márquez Olympic Pool	1968 Mexico City	Diving, Modern pentathlon (swimming), Swimming, Water polo (final)	15,000	
Franco-British Exhibition Fencing Grounds	1908 London	Fencing	Not listed.	
Fuchu City	1964 Tokyo	Athletics (marathon, 50 km walk)	Not listed.	

== G ==
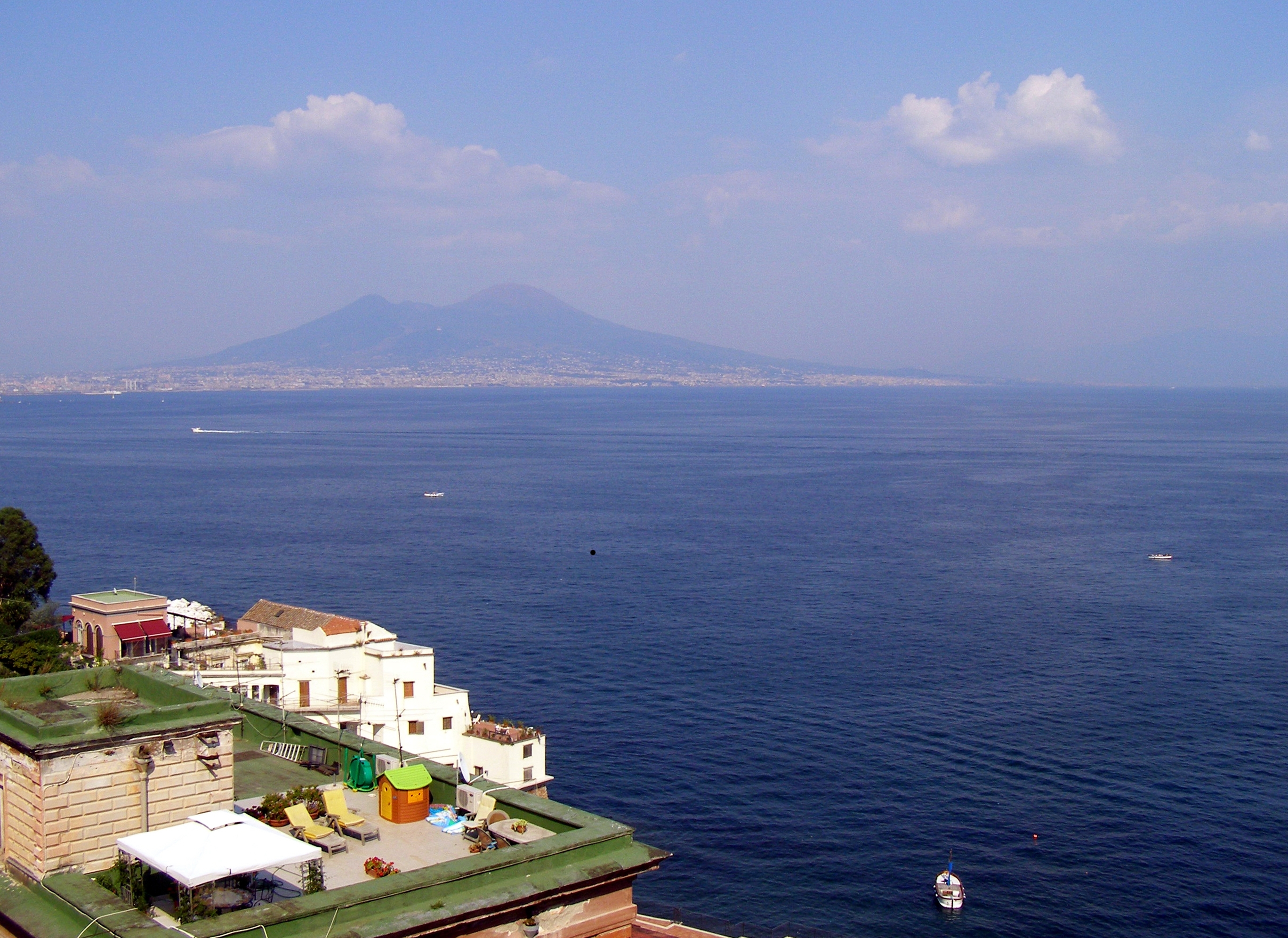
The Gulf of Naples hosted the sailing events for the 1960 Summer Olympics held in Rome.

Venue	Games	Sports	Capacity	Ref.
Galatsi Olympic Hall	2004 Athens	Gymnastics (rhythmic), Table tennis	Not listed.	
Gardens de la Palace d'Egmont	1920 Antwerp	Fencing	Not listed.	
Georgia Dome	1996 Atlanta	Basketball (final), Gymnastics (artistic), Handball (men's final)	34,500 (each side)	
Georgia International Horse Park	1996 Atlanta	Cycling (mountain bike), Equestrian, Modern pentathlon (riding, running)	32,000	
Georgia State University Gymnasium	1996 Atlanta	Badminton	3,500	
Georgia Tech Aquatic Center	1996 Atlanta	Diving, Modern pentathlon (swimming), Swimming, Synchronized swimming, Water polo	15,000	
Georgia World Congress Center	1996 Atlanta	Fencing, Handball, Judo, Modern pentathlon (fencing, shooting), Table tennis, Weightlifting, Wrestling	3,900 (fencing); 7,300 (handball); 7,300 (judo); 4,700 (table tennis); 5,000 (weightlifting); 7,300 (wrestling)	
Glen Echo Country Club	1904 St. Louis	Golf	Not listed.	
Golden Park	1996 Atlanta	Softball	8,800	
Goudi Olympic Hall	2004 Athens	Badminton	8,000	
Grand Arena	1980 Moscow	Athletics, Equestrian (jumping individual), Football (final), Opening/closing ceremonies	78,360	
Green Pond Road Stadium	1948 London	Football	21,708	
Greenwich Park	2012 London	Equestrian, Modern pentathlon (riding, running)	23,000	
Griffin Park	1948 London	Football	12,763	
Grosseto Communal Stadium	1960 Rome	Football	10.200	
Grünau Regatta Course	1936 Berlin	Canoeing, Rowing	19,000	
Grünwald	1972 Munich	Cycling (individual road race)	Not listed.	
Guinness Sports Club	1948 London	Field hockey	Not listed.	
Gulf of Naples	1960 Rome	Sailing	Not listed.	
