= World and Olympic records set at the 2004 Summer Olympics =

A number of new world records and Olympic records were set in various events at the 2004 Summer Olympics.

== Archery ==
=== World records (and Olympic records) ===
- Men's individual (70 m, 72 arrow): South Korea's Im Dong-hyun, 687 points

previous record of 685 was set in 1995 by Young Sung Shim and tied in 1996 by Kyo Moon Oh (August 12)

- Women's individual (70 m, 72 arrow): South Korea's Park Sung-hyun, 682 points (August 12)

previous record of 679 was set in 2004 by Natalia Valeeva

- Women's team (70 m, 216 arrow): South Korea's Lee Sung Jin, Park Sung Hyun, Yun Mi Jin, 2030 points (August 12)

previous record of 1994 was set at 2000 Games by South Korean team

=== Olympic records ===
- Men's Individual (70 m, 18 arrow): Korea's Park Kyung Mo, 173 points

previous record of 172 was set in 2000 by Jang Yong Ho

- Women's Individual (70 m, 18 arrow): Korea's Yun Mi Jin, 173 points (tied record)

previous record of 173 was set in 2000 by Yun Mi Jin

== Athletics ==
=== World records (and Olympic records) ===
- Men's 110 m hurdles: China's Liu Xiang, 12.91 s (tied) (August 27)

record of 12.91 s was set in August 1993 by Colin Jackson

- Women's pole vault: Yelena Isinbayeva of Russia, 4.91 m (August 18)

previous record of 4.90 m set by Isinbayeva

== Cycling ==
=== World records (and Olympic records) ===
- Women's 500 m time trial: Australia's Anna Meares, 33.952 s (August 20)

previous record of 34.000 s was set in August 2002 by Yonghua Jiang

- Women's individual pursuit: New Zealand's Sarah Ulmer, 3:24.537 (August 22)

This record was broken multiple times during these Games, the prior instances being:
- New Zealand's Sarah Ulmer, 3:26.400 (August 21)
- Australia's Katie Mactier, 3:29.945 (August 21)

previous record of 3:30.604 was set in May by Ulmer

- Men's team pursuit: Australia's Graeme Brown, Brett Lancaster, Bradley McGee, Luke Roberts, 3:56.610 (August 22)

previous record of 3:59:583 was set in 2002 by Australian team

== Rowing ==
=== World records (and Olympic records) ===
Note: rowing records are not official due to variable course conditions.

- Women's lightweight double sculls: Australia's Sally Newmarch and Amber Halliday, 6:49.90 (unofficial) (August 15)

previous record of 6:50.63 was set in 1995 by Berit Christoffersen and Lene Andersson

- Men's 8-man boat: United States team, 5:19.85 (unofficial) (August 15)

previous record of 5:22.80 was set in 1999 by Netherlands team

- Women's 8-man boat: United States team, 5:56.55 (unofficial) (August 15)

previous record of 5:57.02 was set in 1999 by Romanian team

== Shooting ==
=== World records (and Olympic records) ===
- Men's 10 m air rifle: China's Zhu Qinan, 702.7 points (August 16)

previous record of 702.5 was set in June 2003 by Jason Parker

- Men's 10 m running target (30+30 shots): Germany's Manfred Kurzer, 590 points (August 19)

previous record of 588 was set in May 2002 by Igor Kolesov, and tied in July 2002 by Yang Ling

=== Olympic records ===
- Men's 10 m Air Rifle (Qualification): China's Zhu Qinan, 599 points

previous record of 596 was set in 1996 by Wolfram Waibel

- Men's 10 m Air Rifle (Final): Zhu, 702.7 points

previous record of 696.4 was set in 2000 by Cai Yalin

- Men's 10 m Air Pistol (Qualification): Russia's Mikhail Nestruev, 591 points

previous record of 590 was set in 2000 by Franck Dumoulin

- Men's 10 m Air Pistol (Final): China's Wang Yifu, 690.0 points

previous record of 688.9 was set in 2000 by Dumoulin

- Men's Trap (Qualification): Russia's Aleksei Alipov, 124 hits (tied record)

previous record of 124 was set in 1996 by Michael Diamond

- Men's Trap (Final): Alipov, 149 hits (tied record)

previous record of 149 was set in 1996 by Diamond

- Men's Double Trap (Qualification): United Arab Emirates's Ahmed Al-Maktoum, 144 hits

previous record of 143 was set in 2000 by Russell Mark

- Men's Double Trap (Final): Almaktoum, 189 hits (tied record)

previous record of 189 was set in 1996 by Mark

- Men's Skeet (Qualification): Finland's Marko Kemppainen, 125 hits (tied record)

previous record of 125 was set in 1996 by Ennio Falco

- Men's 10 m Running Target (Qualification): Germany's Manfred Kurzer, 590 points

previous record of 585 was set in 1996 by Yang Ling

- Women's 50 m Rifle Three positions (Final): Russia's Lioubov Galkina, 688.4 points

previous record of 686.1 was set in 1996 by Aleksandra Ivosev

- Women's 10 m Air Rifle (Qualification): Russia's Galkina, 399 points

previous record of 397 was set in 1996 by Petra Horneber

- Women's 10 m Air Rifle (Final): China's Du Li, 502.0 points

previous record of 498.2 was set in 1992 by Yeo Kab-Soon

- Women's 25 m Pistol (Final): Bulgaria's Mariya Grozdeva, 688.2 points

established new record after rule change

== Swimming ==
=== World records (and Olympic records) ===
- Women's 100 m freestyle: Australia's Jodie Henry, 53.52 s (August 18)

previous record of 53.66 s was set in March 2004 by Libby Lenton

- Men's 400 m medley: United States's Michael Phelps, 4:08.26 (August 14)

previous record of 4:08.41 was set in July 2004 by Phelps

- Men's 4 × 100 m freestyle: South Africa's Roland Schoeman, Darian Townsend, Lyndon Ferns, Ryk Neethling, 3:13.17 (August 15)

previous record of 3:13.67 was set at 2000 Games by Australian team

- Women's 4 × 100 m freestyle: Australia's Alice Mills, Libby Lenton, Petria Thomas, Jodie Henry, 3:35.94 (August 14)

previous record of 3:36.00 was set in July 2002 by German team

- Men's 4 × 100 m medley: United States's Aaron Peirsol, Brendan Hansen, Ian Crocker, Jason Lezak, 3:30.68 (August 21)

previous record of 3:31.54 was set in July 2003 by United States team

- Backstroke leg of Men's 4 × 100 m medley: United States's Aaron Peirsol, 53.45 s (August 21)

previous record of 53.60 s was set in August 1999 by Lenny Krayzelburg

- Women's 4 × 100 m medley: Australia's Jodie Henry, Leisel Jones, Giaan Rooney, Petria Thomas, 3:57.32 (August 21)

previous record of 3:58.30 was set at 2000 Games by United States team

- Women's 4 × 200 m freestyle: United States's Natalie Coughlin, Carly Piper, Dana Vollmer, Kaitlin Sandeno, 7:53.42 (August 18)

previous record of 7:55.47 was set in August 1987 by East German team

== Weightlifting ==
=== World records (and Olympic records) ===
- Women's under 48 kg (total): Turkey's Nurcan Taylan, 210.0 kg (August 14)

previous record of 207.5 kg was set in November 2002 by Mingjuan Wang

- Women's under 48 kg (snatch): Turkey's Nurcan Taylan, 97.5 kg (August 14)

previous record of 93.5 kg was set in September 2003 by Zhou Li

- Women's 58–63 kg (snatch): Belarus' Hanna Batsiushka, 115.0 kg (August 18)

previous record of 113.5 kg was set in November 2003 by Batsiushk

- Men's 56–62 kg (total): China's Shi Zhiyong, 325 kg (tied) (August 16)

record of 325 kg was set at 2000 Games by Nikolai Peshalov

- Women's 63–69 kg (snatch): China's Liu Chunhong, 122.5 kg (August 19)

previous record of 120.0 kg was set in November 2003 by Liu

- Women's 63–69 kg (clean and jerk): China's Liu Chunhong, 153.0 kg (August 19)

previous record of 152.5 kg was set in November 2003 by Liu

- Women's 63–69 kg (total): China's Liu Chunhong, 275.0 kg (August 19)

previous record of 270.0 kg was set in November 2003 by Liu

- Women's over 75 kg (clean and jerk): China's Tang Gonghong, 182.5 kg (August 21)

previous record of 175.0 kg was set in April 2004 by Tang

- Women's over 75 kg (total): China's Tang Gonghong, 305.0 kg (August 21)

previous record of 302.5 kg was set in April 2004 by Tang

- Men's over 105 kg (clean and jerk): Iran's Hossein Reza Zadeh, 263.5 kg (August 25)

previous record of 263.0 kg was set in November 2002 by Reza Zadeh
