= 2004 Summer Olympics =

Multi-sport event in Athens, Greece

Games of the XXVIII Olympiad
- Emblem of the 2004 Summer Olympics (Note: The 2004 Olympic Games emblem is a wreath made from an olive tree branch, or kotinos. The emblem is a reference to the ancient Olympic Games, where the kotinos was the official award of Olympic champions. In addition, the olive was the sacred tree of Athens. The colours of the emblem symbolise the shades of white and blue found in the Greek countryside; Down below the word "ATHENS 2004" was put above the Olympic ring.)
- Location: Athens, Greece
- Motto: Welcome Home (Greek: Καλώς ήρθατε σπίτι, romanized: Kalós írthate spíti)
- Nations: 201
- Athletes: 10,557 (6,257 men, 4,300 women)
- Events: 301 in 28 sports (40 disciplines)
- Opening: 13 August 2004
- Closing: 29 August 2004
- Opened by: President Konstantinos Stephanopoulos
- Closed by: IOC President Jacques Rogge
- Cauldron: Nikolaos Kaklamanakis
- Stadium: Olympic Stadium

The 2004 Summer Olympics (Greek: Θερινοί Ολυμπιακοί Αγώνες 2004, romanized: Theriní Olympiakí Agónes 2004), (Note: Standard Modern Greek pronunciation is [θeriˈni olibi.aˈci aˈɣonez ðˈio çiˈʎaðes ˈtesera].) officially the Games of the XXVIII Olympiad (Αγώνες της 28ης Ολυμπιάδας, Agónes tis 28is Olympiádas), and officially branded as Athens 2004 (Αθήνα 2004), were an international multi-sport event held from 13 to 29 August 2004 in Athens, Greece.

The Games saw 10,625 athletes compete, some 600 more than expected, accompanied by 5,501 team officials from 201 countries, with 301 medal events in 28 different sports. The 2004 Games marked the first time since the 1996 Summer Olympics that all countries with a National Olympic Committee were in attendance, and also marked the first time Athens hosted the Games since their first modern incarnation in 1896 as well as the return of the Olympic games to its birthplace. Athens became the fourth city to host the Summer Olympic Games on two occasions (together with Paris, London and Los Angeles). A new medal obverse was introduced at these Games, replacing the design by Giuseppe Cassioli that had been used since 1928. The new design features the Panathenaic Stadium in Athens rectifying the long-running mistake of using a depiction of the Roman Colosseum rather than a Greek venue.

The 2004 Olympic Games were hailed as "unforgettable dream games" by then-IOC president Jacques Rogge, and left Athens with a significantly improved infrastructure, including a new airport, ring road and subway system. There has been debate (mostly in popular media) regarding the cost of the Games and their possible contribution to the 2010–18 Greek government-debt crisis, although there is little or no evidence supporting this claim. The 2004 Games were generally deemed to be a success, with the rising standard of competition amongst nations across the world. The final medal tally was led by the United States, followed by China and Russia with host nation Greece in 15th place. Several world and Olympic records were also broken during these Games.

Chile, Chinese Taipei, Dominican Republic, Georgia and Israel won their first Olympic gold medals. Eritrea and Paraguay won their first Olympic medals. The United Arab Emirates (UAE) won both their first Olympic medal and gold medal in this event.

== Host city selection ==
Athens was chosen as the host city during the 106th IOC Session held in Lausanne, Switzerland, on 5 September 1997. The Greek capital had lost its bid to organize the 1996 Summer Olympics to the American city of Atlanta nearly seven years before, during the 96th IOC Session in Tokyo, Japan on 18 September 1990. Under the direction of Gianna Angelopoulos-Daskalaki, Athens pursued another bid, this time for the right to host the Summer Olympics in 2004. The success of Athens in securing the 2004 Games was based largely on the bid's appeal to human values, the history of the Games from ancient age and modern age and the emphasis that Athens is placed at the pivotal role that Greece and Athens could play in promoting the Modern Olympism and the Olympic Movement. Unlike the 1996 bid that was seen arrogant when the city was bidding, the 2004 bid was lauded for its low scale, humility, honest and earnestness, its focused message, and a more real and detailed bid concept.

During the unsuccessful 1996 bid, concerns and criticisms were raised – primarily regarding critical subjects about the city's infrastructural readiness, its air pollution, its budget and politicization of the Games' events and their preparations. The subsequent successful organization of other events such as the 1991 Mediterranean Games, the 1994 FIVB Volleyball Men's World Championship, 1994 World Fencing Championships and the successful 1997 World Championships in Athletics, one month before the Olympic host city election was crucial in allaying lingering fears and concerns among the sporting community and some IOC members about the Greek ability to host international sporting events. Another factor that contributed to the Greek capital's selection was a growing sentiment among some IOC members to restore some original values of the Olympics to the Modern Games, a component which they felt was lost during the 1996 Summer Olympics.

After leading all voting rounds, Athens easily defeated Rome in the fifth and final vote. Cape Town, Stockholm, and Buenos Aires (the latter won the rights to host the 2018 Summer Youth Olympics in 2013), the three other cities that made the IOC shortlist, were eliminated in prior rounds of voting. Six other cities submitted applications, but their bids were dropped by the IOC in 1996. These cities were Istanbul, Lille, Rio de Janeiro (the latter won the rights to host the 2016 Summer Olympics in 2009), San Juan, Seville, and Saint Petersburg.

2004 host city election – ballot results
City	Country	Round				
City	Country	1	Run-Off	2	3	4
Athens	Greece	32	—	38	52	66
Rome	Italy	23	—	28	35	41
Cape Town	South Africa	16	62	22	20	—
Stockholm	Sweden	20	—	19	—	—
Buenos Aires	Argentina	16	44	—	—	—

== Development and preparation ==
=== Costs ===
The 2004 Summer Olympic Games cost the Government of Greece near €9 billion to stage. The Athens 2004 Organizing Committee (ATHOC), responsible for the preparation and organisation of the Games, concluded its operations as a company in 2005 with a surplus of €130.6 million. The State's contribution to the total ATHOC budget was 8% of its expenditure against an originally anticipated 14%. The overall revenue of ATHOC, including income from tickets, sponsors, broadcasting rights, merchandise sales etc., totalled near €2.1 billion. The largest percentage of that income (38%) came from media rights. According to the cost-benefit evaluation of the impact of the Athens 2004 Olympic Games presented to the Greek Parliament in January 2013 by the Minister of Finance Mr. Giannis Stournaras, the overall net economic benefit for Greece was positive.

The Greek Ministry of Finance reported in 2013 that the expenses of the Greek state for the Athens 2004 Olympic and Paralympic Games, including both infrastructure and organizational costs, reached the amount of €8.5 billion. The same report further explains that €2 billion of this amount was covered by the revenue of the ATHOC (from tickets, sponsors, broadcasting rights, merchandise sales etc.) and that another €2 billion was directly invested in upgrading hospitals and preserving archaeological sites. Therefore, the net infrastructure costs related to the preparation of the Athens 2004 Olympic Games was €4.5 billion, substantially lower than the reported estimates, and mainly included long-standing fixed asset investments in numerous municipal and transport infrastructures.

On the revenue side, the same report estimates that incremental tax revenues of approximately €3.5 billion arose from the increased activities caused by the Athens 2004 Olympic Games during the period 2000 to 2004. These tax revenues were paid directly to the Greek state specifically in the form of incremental social security contributions, income taxes and VAT tax paid by all the companies, professionals, and service providers that were directly involved with the Olympic Games. Moreover, it is reported that the Athens 2004 Olympic Games have had a great economic growth impact on the Greek economy, in the words of the Greek Minister of Finance, is that "as a result from the cost-benefit analysis, we reach the conclusion that there has been a net economic benefit from the Olympic Games".

=== Comparison to other Olympic Games ===
Cost per sporting event for Athens 2004 was US$9.8 million. This compares with US$14.9 million for Rio 2016, US$49.5 million for London 2012, and US$22.5 million for Beijing 2008. Average cost per event for the Summer Games since 1960 is US$19.9 million.

Cost per athlete for Athens 2004 was US$0.3 million. This compares with US$0.4 million for Rio 2016, US$1.4 million for London 2012, and US$0.6 million for Beijing 2008. Average cost per athlete for the Summer Games since 1960 is US$0.6 million.

Cost overrun for Athens 2004 was 49%, measured in real terms from the bid to host the Games. This compares with 51% for Rio 2016 and 76% for London 2012. Average cost overrun for the Summer Games since 1960 is 176%.

=== Construction ===
Faliro Sports Pavilion Arena

By late March 2004, some Olympic projects were still behind schedule, and Greek authorities announced that a roof it had initially proposed as an optional, non-vital addition to the Aquatics Center would no longer be built. The main Olympic Stadium, the designated facility for the opening and closing ceremonies, was completed only two months before the Games opened. This stadium was completed with a retractable glass roof designed by Spanish architect Santiago Calatrava. The same architect also designed the Velodrome and other facilities.

Infrastructure, such as the tram line linking venues in southern Athens with the city centre, and numerous venues were considerably behind schedule just two months before the start of the Games. The subsequent pace of preparation, however, made the rush to finish the Athens venues one of the tightest in Olympics history. The Greeks, unperturbed, maintained that they would make it all along. By July/August 2004, all venues were delivered: in August, the Olympic Stadium was officially completed and opened, joined or preceded by the official completion and openings of other venues within the Athens Olympic Sports Complex (OAKA), and the sports complexes in Faliro and Helliniko.

The Athens Olympic Velodrome, designed by Santiago Calatrava, during the 2004 Olympic Games

Late July and early August witnessed the Athens Tram become operational, and this system provided additional connections to those already existing between Athens city centre and its waterfront communities along the Saronic Gulf. These communities included the port city of Piraeus, Agios Kosmas (site of the sailing venue), Helliniko (the site of the old international airport which now contained the fencing venue, the canoe/kayak slalom course, the 15,000-seat Helliniko Olympic Basketball Arena, and the softball and baseball stadia), and the Faliro Coastal Zone Olympic Complex (site of the taekwondo, handball, indoor volleyball, and beach volleyball venues, as well as the newly reconstructed Karaiskaki Stadium for football). The upgrades to the Athens Ring Road were also delivered just in time, as were the expressway upgrades connecting central Athens with peripheral areas such as Markopoulo (site of the shooting and equestrian venues), the newly constructed Eleftherios Venizelos International Airport, Schinias (site of the rowing venue), Maroussi (site of the OAKA), Parnitha (site of the Olympic Village), Galatsi (site of the rhythmic gymnastics and table tennis venue), and Vouliagmeni (site of the triathlon venue). The upgrades to the Athens Metro were also completed, and the new lines became operational by mid-summer.

EMI released Unity, the official pop album of the Athens Olympics, in the leadup to the Olympics. It features contributions from Sting, Lenny Kravitz, Moby, Destiny's Child, and Avril Lavigne. EMI has pledged to donate US$180,000 from the album to UNICEF's HIV/AIDS program in Sub-Saharan Africa.

At least 14 people died during the work on the facilities. Most of these people were not from Greece.

Before the Games, Greek hotel staff staged a series of one-day strikes over wage disputes. They had been asking for a significant raise for the period covering the event being staged. Paramedics and ambulance drivers also protested. They claimed to have the right to the same Olympic bonuses promised to their security force counterparts.

Panorama of Athens Olympic Sports Complex.

== Torch relay ==
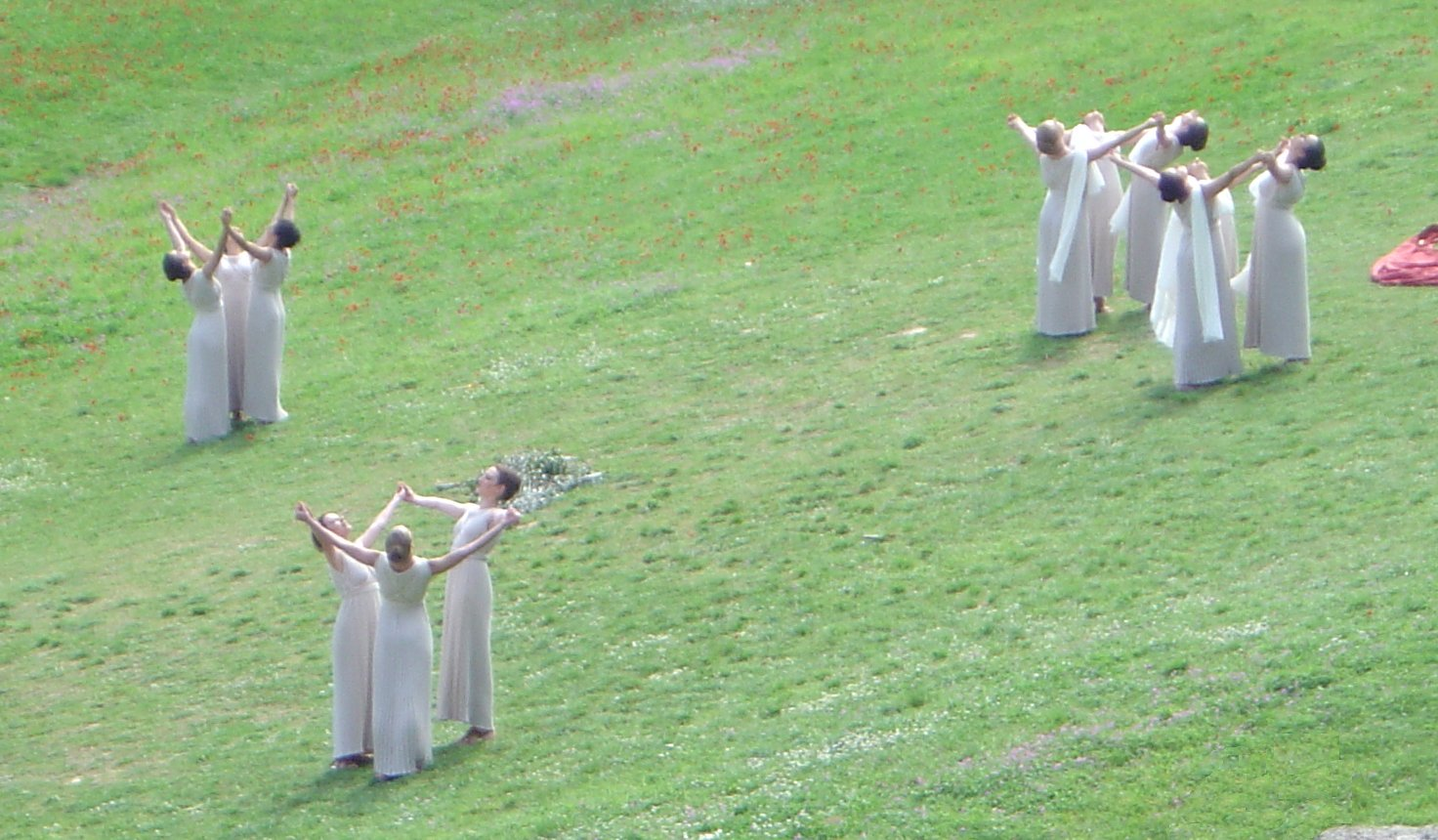
The ceremony for the lighting of the flame was arranged as a pagan pageant, with dancing priestesses.

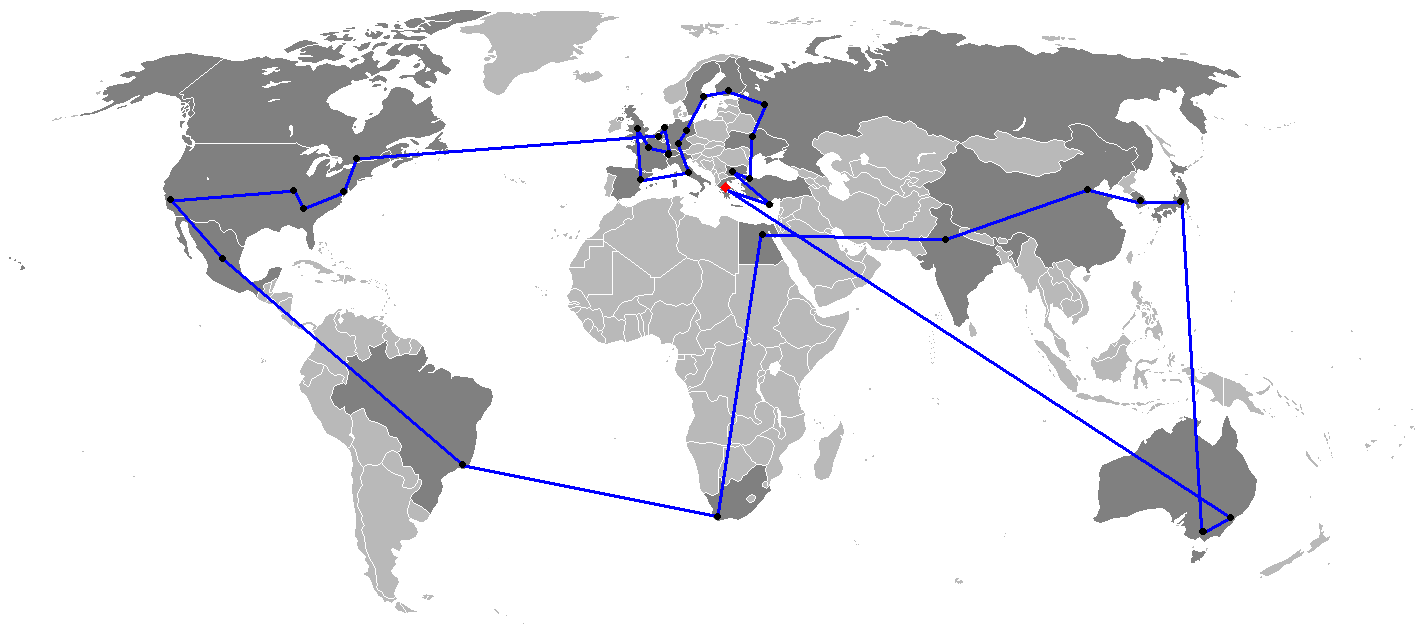
The Olympic Flame toured the world for the first time.

The lighting ceremony of the Olympic flame took place on 25 March 2004 in Ancient Olympia. For the first time ever, the flame travelled around the world in a relay to various Summer Olympic host cities (past and future) and other large cities, before returning to Greece.

== Broadcasting ==
Athens Olympic Broadcasting served as the host broadcaster for the Games, providing over 35,000 hours of coverage to over 300 television channels around the world. Local rights to the Games were held by ERT which devoted their three channels (ET1, NET and ET3) to more than 24 hours of Olympic coverage.

=== Online coverage ===
For the first time, major broadcasters were allowed to serve video coverage of the Olympics over the Internet, provided that they restricted this service geographically, to protect broadcasting contracts in other areas. The International Olympic Committee forbade Olympic athletes, as well as coaches, support personnel and other officials, from setting up specialized weblogs or other websites for covering their personal perspective of the Games. They were not allowed to post audio, video, or photos that they had taken. An exception was made if an athlete already has a personal website that was not set up specifically for the Games. NBC launched its own Olympic website, NBCOlympics.com. Focusing on the television coverage of the Games, it did provide video clips, medal standings, live results. Its main purpose, however, was to provide a schedule of what sports were on the many stations of NBC Universal. The Games were shown on television 24 hours a day, on one network or another.

== Medals ==
The medals awarded during the 2004 Summer Olympics introduced a redesigned obverse for Olympic medals, marking the first major change to the standard design since the 1928 Summer Olympics. Organizers stated that the redesign was intended to emphasize the Greek heritage of the Olympic Games and their revival in the modern era.

Previous Olympic medals, used from 1928 through the 2000 Summer Olympics, depicted the goddess Nike seated while holding an ear of corn and a wreath. For Athens 2004, Nike was instead portrayed flying into the stadium to deliver victory to the winning athlete. The Panathenaic Stadium, the venue of the first modern Olympic Games in 1896, was also depicted on the obverse side, alongside an engraving identifying the athlete's sporting discipline.

The reverse side of the medal incorporated three principal elements: the Olympic flame lit in Olympia and carried across five continents during the torch relay; the opening lines of the Eighth Olympic Ode by the ancient Greek poet Pindar, originally composed in 460 BC to commemorate the wrestler Alkimedon of Aegina; and the official emblem of the Athens 2004 Games.

The medals were designed by Elena Votsi and produced by Efsimon. The medals had a diameter of 60 millimetres and were awarded in gold, silver and bronze compositions corresponding to first, second and third place respectively.

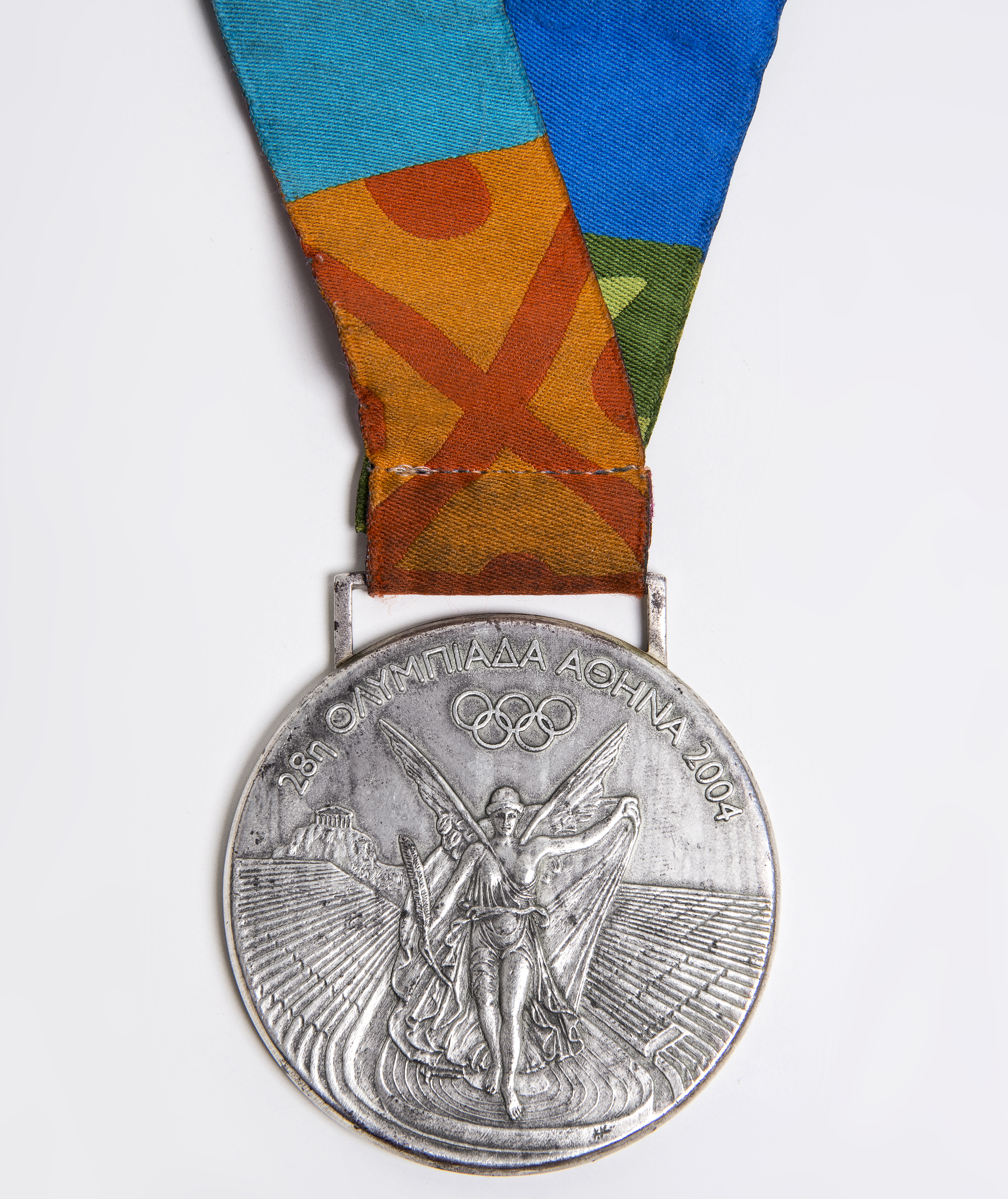
Front of the silver medal from the 2004 Summer Olympics

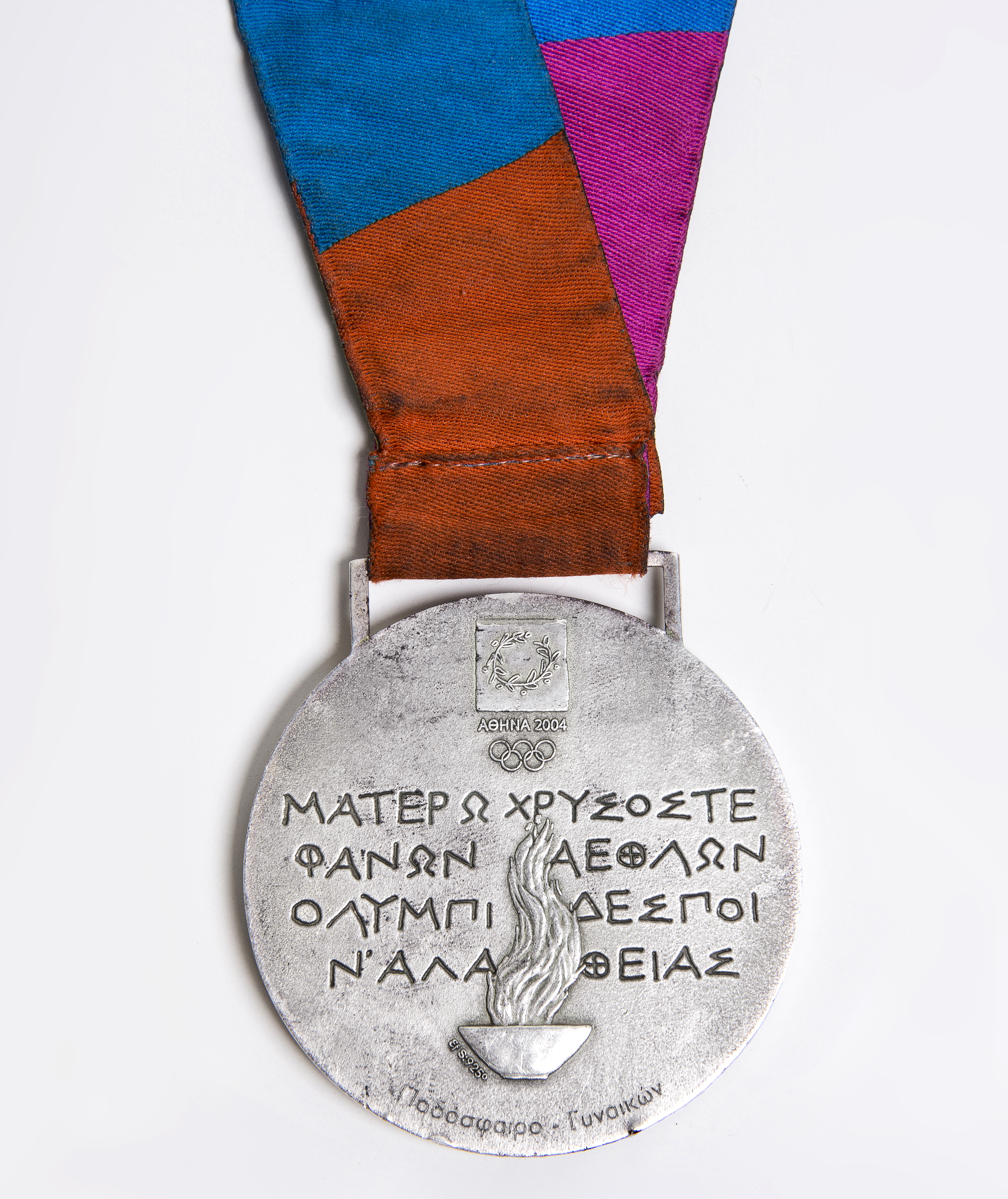
Reverse of the silver medal from the 2004 Summer Olympics

=== Podium ===
The podiums used during the 2004 Summer Olympics incorporated elements of the "Panorama" visual identity developed for the Games. The "Panorama" design reflected aspects of Greek culture, language and landscape, drawing inspiration from the colours of the sea and the tones of the country's olive groves.

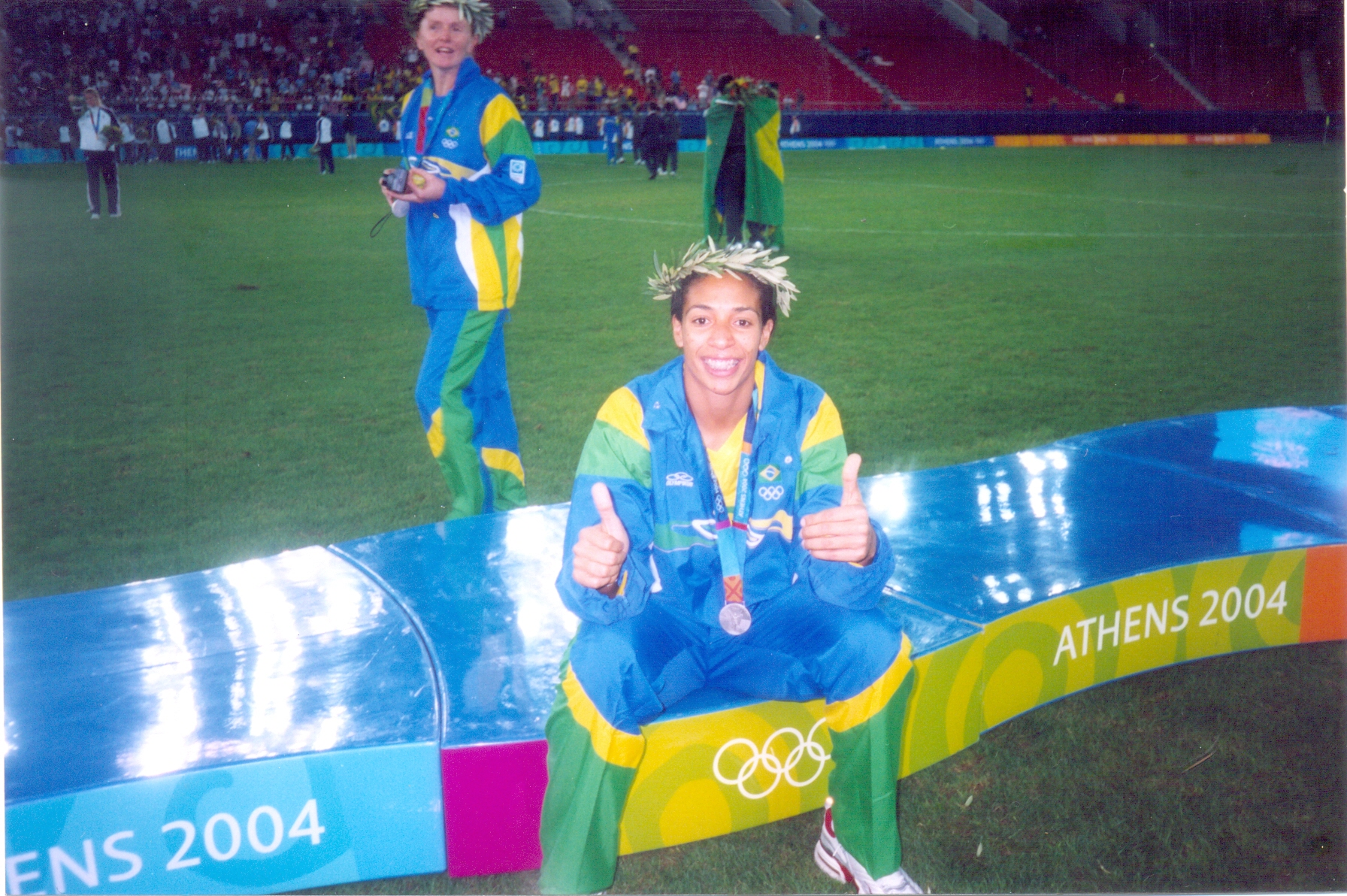
Brazilian footballer Aline Pellegrino seated on the Women's football tournament podium at the 2004 Summer Olympics

During the 2004 Summer Olympics, medal-winning athletes standing on the podium were crowned with olive wreaths, referencing traditions associated with the ancient Olympic Games.

== Technology ==
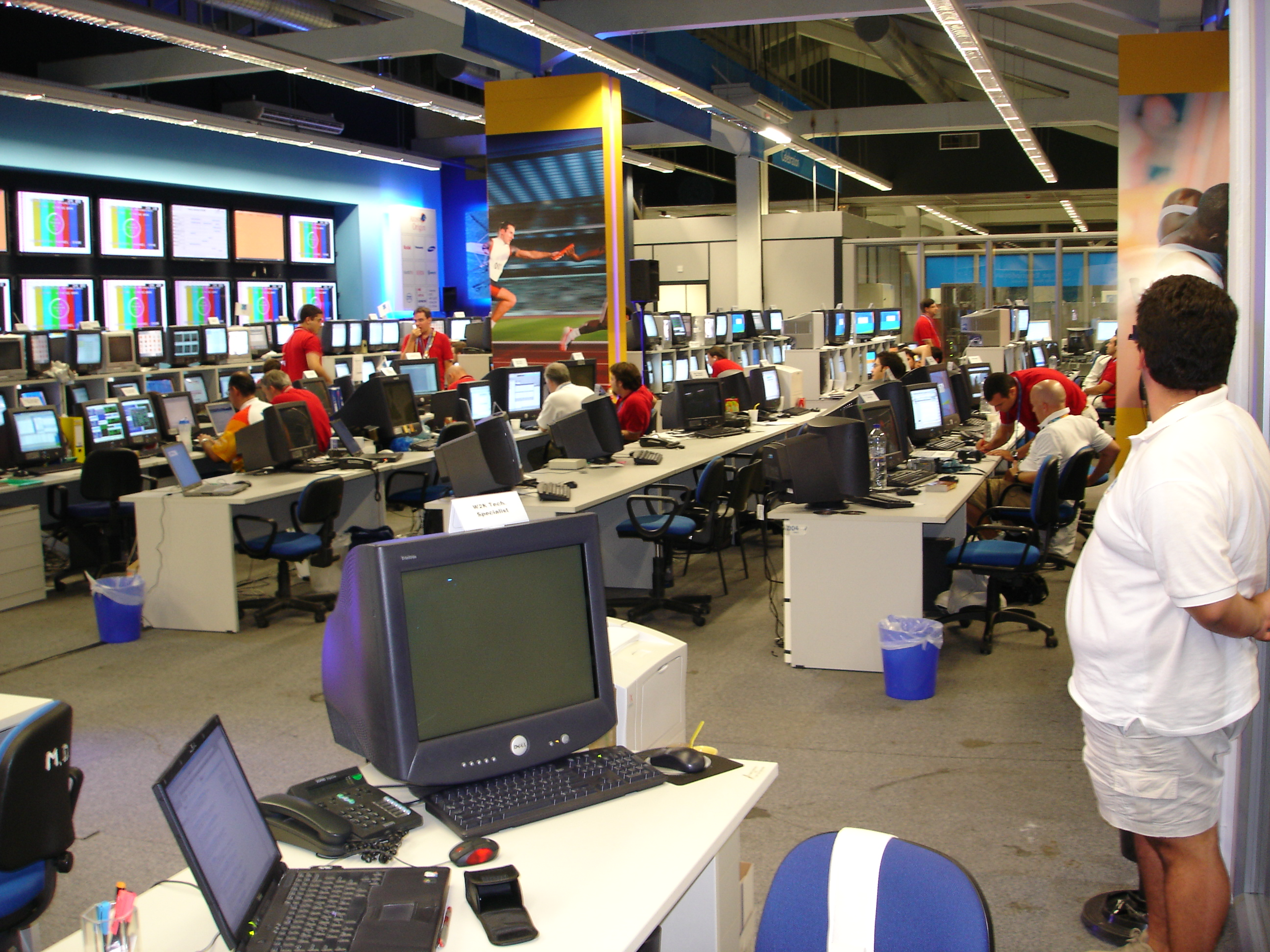
View of the ATHOC Technology Operations Center during the Games.

As with any enterprise, the organizing committee and everyone involved with it relied heavily on technology in order to deliver a successful event. ATHOC maintained two separate data networks, one for the preparation of the Games (known as the Administrative network) and one for the Games themselves (Games Network). The technical infrastructure involved more than 11,000 computers, over 600 servers, 2,000 printers, 23,000 fixed-line telephone devices, 9,000 mobile phones, 12,000 TETRA devices, 16,000 TV and video devices and 17 Video Walls interconnected by more than 6,000 kilometers of cabling (both optical fiber and twisted pair).

This infrastructure was created and maintained to serve directly more than 150,000 ATHOC Staff, Volunteers, Olympic family members (IOC, NOCs, Federations), Partners & Sponsors and Media. It also kept the information flowing for all spectators, TV viewers, Website visitors and news readers around the world, prior and during the Games. The Media Center was located inside the Zappeion which is a Greek national exhibition center.

Between June and August 2004, the technology staff worked in the Technology Operations Center (TOC) from where it could centrally monitor and manage all the devices and flow of information, as well as handle any problems that occurred during the Games. The TOC was organized in teams (e.g. Systems, Telecommunications, Information Security, Data Network, Staffing, etc.) under a TOC Director and corresponding team leaders (Shift Managers). The TOC operated on a 24x7 basis with personnel organized into 12-hour shifts.

== The Games ==
=== Opening ceremony ===
The Olympic Flame at the opening ceremony

The opening ceremony of the games, directed by choreographer Dimitris Papaioannou and produced by Jack Morton Worldwide, led by project director David Zolkwer, was held on 13 August 2004. It began with a twenty-eight (the number of the Olympiads up to then) second countdown paced by the sounds of an amplified heartbeat. As the countdown was completed, fireworks rumbled and illuminated the skies overhead. After a drum corps and bouzouki players joined in an opening march, the video screen showed images of flight, crossing southwest from Athens over the Greek countryside to ancient Olympia. Then, a single drummer in the ancient stadium joined in a drum duet with a single drummer in the main stadium in Athens, joining the original ancient Olympic Games with the modern ones in symbolism.

At the end of the drum duet, a single flaming arrow was launched from the video screen (symbolically from ancient Olympia) and into the reflecting pool, which resulted in fire erupting in the middle of the stadium creating a burning image of the Olympic rings rising from the pool. The opening ceremony was a pageant of traditional Greek culture and history hearkening back to its mythological beginnings. The program began as a young Greek boy sailed into the stadium on a 'paper-ship' waving the host nation's flag to aethereal music by Manos Hatzidakis and then a centaur appeared, followed by a gigantic head of a cycladic figurine which eventually broke into many pieces symbolising the Greek islands. Underneath the cycladic head was a Hellenistic representation of the human body, reflecting the concept and belief in perfection reflected in Greek art. A man was seen balancing on a hovering cube symbolising man's eternal 'split' between passion and reason followed by a couple of young lovers playfully chasing each other while the god Eros was hovering above them. There followed a very colourful float parade chronicling Greek history from the ancient Minoan civilization to modern times.

Although NBC in the United States presented the entire opening ceremony from start to finish, a topless Minoan priestess was shown only briefly, the breasts having been pixelated digitally in order to avoid controversy (as the "Nipplegate" incident was still fresh in viewer's minds at the time) and potential fines by the Federal Communications Commission. Also, lower frontal nudity of men dressed as ancient Greek statues was shown in such a way that the area below the waist was cut off by the bottom of the screen. Overall, NBC's coverage of the Olympics has been praised, and the company was awarded with 6 Emmy Awards for its coverage of the Games and technical production. Additionally, NBC televised all 28 sports in the 2004 Games, becoming the first broadcaster to do so.

Following the artistic performances, a parade of nations entered the stadium with over 10,500 athletes walking under the banners of 201 nations. The nations were arranged according to Greek alphabet making the Philippines, Finland, Fiji, Chile, and Hong Kong the last five to enter the stadium before the Greek delegation. On this occasion, in observance of the tradition that the delegation of Greece opens the parade and the host nation closes it, the Greek flag bearer opened the parade and all the Greek delegation closed it. Based on audience reaction, the emotional high point of the parade was the entrance of the delegation from Afghanistan which had been absent from the Olympics and had female competitors for the first time. The Iraqi delegation also stirred emotions. Also recognized was the symbolic unified march of athletes from North Korea and South Korea under the Korean Unification Flag. (Note: The national teams of North Korea and South Korea competed separately in the Olympic events, even though they marched together as a unified Korean team in the opening ceremony. Later, in Beijing, the two Koreas marched separately. In Pyeongchang, these countries marched and competed together as host, bearing the name United Korean.) The country of Kiribati made its debut appearance at these Games and East Timor made a debut under its own flag. After the Parade of Nations, during which the Dutch DJ Tiësto provided the music, the Icelandic singer Björk performed the song "Oceania", written specially for the event by her and the poet Sjón.

The opening ceremony culminated in the lighting of the Olympic cauldron by 1996 gold medalist windsurfer Nikolaos Kaklamanakis. Many key moments in the ceremony, including the lighting of the Olympic Cauldron, featured music composed and arranged by New Zealand composer John Psathas. The gigantic cauldron, which was styled after the Athens 2004 Olympic torch, pivoted down to be lit by the 35-year-old, before slowly swinging up and lifting the flame above the stadium. Following this, a fireworks display commenced to conclude the ceremony.

=== Participating National Olympic Committees ===
Participating nations

Team numbers

All National Olympic Committees (NOCs) except Djibouti participated in the Athens Games. Two new NOCs had been created since 2000 and made their debut at these Games (Kiribati and East Timor). Therefore, with the return of Afghanistan (who had been banned from the 2000 Summer Olympics), the number of participating nations increased from 199 to 201. Additionally, Yugoslavia had changed its name the year prior to Serbia and Montenegro and its code from YUG to SCG; the country would dissolve two years later, making this its only Olympics appearance under the new moniker. Georgia's new flag made its debut at the Olympics by unfurling it at the opening ceremony on 13 August. It replaces the post-Soviet flag, which had been used since Lillehammer 1994.

In the table below, the number in parentheses indicates the number of participants contributed by each NOC.

Participating National Olympic Committees
- Afghanistan (5)
- Albania (7)
- Algeria (61)
- American Samoa (3)
- Andorra (6)
- Angola (30)
- Antigua and Barbuda (5)
- Argentina (152)
- Armenia (18)
- Aruba (4)
- Australia (470)
- Austria (74)
- Azerbaijan (36)
- Bahamas (22)
- Bahrain (10)
- Bangladesh (4)
- Barbados (10)
- Belarus (151)
- Belgium (50)
- Belize (2)
- Benin (4)
- Bermuda (10)
- Bhutan (2)
- Bolivia (7)
- Bosnia and Herzegovina (9)
- Botswana (11)
- Brazil (243)
- British Virgin Islands (1)
- Brunei (1)
- Bulgaria (95)
- Burkina Faso (5)
- Burundi (7)
- Cambodia (4)
- Cameroon (17)
- Canada (262)
- Cape Verde (3)
- Cayman Islands (5)
- Central African Republic (4)
- Chad (1)
- Chile (22)
- China (383)
- Colombia (53)
- Comoros (3)
- Republic of the Congo (5)
- Cook Islands (3)
- Costa Rica (20)
- Croatia (81)
- Cuba (151)
- Cyprus (20)
- Czech Republic (142)
- Democratic Republic of the Congo (4)
- Denmark (92)
- Dominica (2)
- Dominican Republic (33)
- Ecuador (16)
- Egypt (97)
- El Salvador (7)
- Equatorial Guinea (2)
- Eritrea (4)
- Estonia (42)
- Ethiopia (26)
- Federated States of Micronesia (5)
- Fiji (8)
- Finland (53)
- France (308)
- Gabon (5)
- The Gambia (2)
- Georgia (32)
- Germany (441)
- Ghana (26)
- Great Britain (264)
- Greece (426) (host)
- Grenada (5)
- Guam (4)
- Guatemala (18)
- Guinea (3)
- Guinea-Bissau (3)
- Guyana (4)
- Haiti (8)
- Honduras (5)
- Hong Kong (32)
- Hungary (209)
- Iceland (26)
- India (73)
- Indonesia (38)
- Iran (37)
- Iraq (24)
- Ireland (46)
- Israel (36)
- Italy (364)
- Ivory Coast (5)
- Jamaica (47)
- Japan (306)
- Jordan (8)
- Kazakhstan (114)
- Kenya (46)
- Kiribati (3)
- North Korea (36)
- South Korea (264)
- Kuwait (11)
- Kyrgyzstan (29)
- Laos (5)
- Latvia (32)
- Lebanon (5)
- Lesotho (3)
- Liberia (2)
- Libya (8)
- Liechtenstein (1)
- Lithuania (59)
- Luxembourg (10)
- Macedonia (10)
- Madagascar (8)
- Malawi (4)
- Malaysia (26)
- Maldives (4)
- Mali (21)
- Malta (7)
- Mauritania (2)
- Mauritius (9)
- Mexico (109)
- Moldova (33)
- Monaco (3)
- Mongolia (20)
- Morocco (55)
- Mozambique (4)
- Myanmar (2)
- Namibia (8)
- Nauru (3)
- Nepal (6)
- Netherlands (210)
- Netherlands Antilles (3)
- New Zealand (148)
- Nicaragua (5)
- Niger (4)
- Nigeria (70)
- Norway (52)
- Oman (2)
- Pakistan (26)
- Palau (4)
- Palestine (3)
- Panama (4)
- Papua New Guinea (4)
- Paraguay (22)
- Peru (12)
- Philippines (16)
- Poland (194)
- Portugal (81)
- Puerto Rico (43)
- Qatar (15)
- Romania (108)
- Russia (446)
- Rwanda (5)
- Saint Kitts and Nevis (2)
- Saint Lucia (2)
- Saint Vincent and the Grenadines (3)
- Samoa (3)
- San Marino (5)
- São Tomé and Príncipe (2)
- Saudi Arabia (16)
- Senegal (15)
- Serbia and Montenegro (85)
- Seychelles (9)
- Sierra Leone (2)
- Singapore (16)
- Slovakia (64)
- Slovenia (79)
- Solomon Islands (2)
- Somalia (2)
- South Africa (106)
- Spain (316)
- Sri Lanka (7)
- Sudan (4)
- Suriname (4)
- Swaziland (3)
- Sweden (115)
- Switzerland (98)
- Syria (6)
- Chinese Taipei (88)
- Tajikistan (9)
- Tanzania (8)
- Thailand (42)
- Timor-Leste (2)
- Togo (3)
- Tonga (5)
- Trinidad and Tobago (19)
- Tunisia (54)
- Turkey (64)
- Turkmenistan (9)
- Uganda (11)
- Ukraine (239)
- United Arab Emirates (4)
- United States (533)
- Uruguay (15)
- Uzbekistan (69)
- Vanuatu (2)
- Venezuela (48)
- Vietnam (11)
- Virgin Islands (6)
- Yemen (3)
- Zambia (6)
- Zimbabwe (12)

- Four athletes from Djibouti took part in the opening ceremony, but for reasons unknown, they did not compete at the Games.

=== Number of athletes by National Olympic Committee ===
10,557 athletes from 201 NOCs participated in the 2004 Summer Olympics.

IOC Letter Code	Country	Athletes
USA	United States	533
AUS	Australia	470
RUS	Russia	446
GER	Germany	441
GRE	Greece	426
CHN	China	383
ITA	Italy	364
ESP	Spain	316
FRA	France	308
JPN	Japan	306
GBR	Great Britain	264
KOR	South Korea	264
CAN	Canada	262
BRA	Brazil	243
UKR	Ukraine	239
NED	Netherlands	210
HUN	Hungary	209
POL	Poland	194
ARG	Argentina	152
BLR	Belarus	151
CUB	Cuba	151
NZL	New Zealand	148
CZE	Czech Republic	142
SWE	Sweden	115
KAZ	Kazakhstan	114
MEX	Mexico	109
ROU	Romania	108
RSA	South Africa	106
SUI	Switzerland	98
EGY	Egypt	97
BUL	Bulgaria	95
DEN	Denmark	92
TPE	Chinese Taipei	88
SCG	Serbia and Montenegro	85
CRO	Croatia	81
POR	Portugal	81
SLO	Slovenia	79
AUT	Austria	74
IND	India	73
NGR	Nigeria	70
UZB	Uzbekistan	69
SVK	Slovakia	64
TUR	Turkey	64
ALG	Algeria	61
LTU	Lithuania	59
MAR	Morocco	55
TUN	Tunisia	54
COL	Colombia	53
FIN	Finland	53
NOR	Norway	52
BEL	Belgium	50
VEN	Venezuela	48
JAM	Jamaica	47
IRL	Ireland	46
KEN	Kenya	46
PUR	Puerto Rico	43
EST	Estonia	42
THA	Thailand	42
INA	Indonesia	38
IRI	Iran	37
AZE	Azerbaijan	36
ISR	Israel	36
PRK	North Korea	36
DOM	Dominican Republic	33
MDA	Moldova	33
GEO	Georgia	32
HKG	Hong Kong	32
LAT	Latvia	32
ANG	Angola	30
KGZ	Kyrgyzstan	29
ETH	Ethiopia	26
GHA	Ghana	26
ISL	Iceland	26
MAS	Malaysia	26
PAK	Pakistan	26
IRQ	Iraq	24
BAH	Bahamas	22
CHI	Chile	22
PAR	Paraguay	22
MLI	Mali	21
CRC	Costa Rica	20
CYP	Cyprus	20
MGL	Mongolia	20
TRI	Trinidad and Tobago	19
ARM	Armenia	18
GUA	Guatemala	18
CMR	Cameroon	17
ECU	Ecuador	16
PHI	Philippines	16
KSA	Saudi Arabia	16
SIN	Singapore	16
QAT	Qatar	15
SEN	Senegal	15
URU	Uruguay	15
PER	Peru	12
ZIM	Zimbabwe	12
BOT	Botswana	11
KUW	Kuwait	11
UGA	Uganda	11
VIE	Vietnam	11
BRN	Bahrain	10
BAR	Barbados	10
BER	Bermuda	10
LUX	Luxembourg	10
MKD	Macedonia	10
BIH	Bosnia and Herzegovina	9
MRI	Mauritius	9
SEY	Seychelles	9
TJK	Tajikistan	9
TKM	Turkmenistan	9
FIJ	Fiji	8
HAI	Haiti	8
JOR	Jordan	8
LBA	Libya	8
MAD	Madagascar	8
NAM	Namibia	8
TAN	Tanzania	8
ALB	Albania	7
BOL	Bolivia	7
BDI	Burundi	7
ESA	El Salvador	7
MLT	Malta	7
SRI	Sri Lanka	7
AND	Andorra	6
NEP	Nepal	6
SYR	Syria	6
ISV	Virgin Islands	6
ZAM	Zambia	6
AFG	Afghanistan	5
ANT	Antigua and Barbuda	5
BUR	Burkina Faso	5
CAY	Cayman Islands	5
CGO	Republic of the Congo	5
FSM	Federated States of Micronesia	5
GAB	Gabon	5
GRN	Grenada	5
HON	Honduras	5
CIV	Ivory Coast	5
LAO	Laos	5
LIB	Lebanon	5
NCA	Nicaragua	5
RWA	Rwanda	5
SMR	San Marino	5
TGA	Tonga	5
ARU	Aruba	4
BAN	Bangladesh	4
BEN	Benin	4
CAM	Cambodia	4
CAF	Central African Republic	4
COD	Democratic Republic of the Congo	4
ERI	Eritrea	4
GUM	Guam	4
GUY	Guyana	4
MAW	Malawi	4
MDV	Maldives	4
MOZ	Mozambique	4
NIG	Niger	4
PLW	Palau	4
PAN	Panama	4
PNG	Papua New Guinea	4
SUD	Sudan	4
SUR	Suriname	4
UAE	United Arab Emirates	4
ASA	American Samoa	3
CPV	Cape Verde	3
COM	Comoros	3
COK	Cook Islands	3
GUI	Guinea	3
GBS	Guinea-Bissau	3
KIR	Kiribati	3
LES	Lesotho	3
MON	Monaco	3
NRU	Nauru	3
AHO	Netherlands Antilles	3
PLE	Palestine	3
VIN	Saint Vincent and the Grenadines	3
SAM	Samoa	3
SWZ	Swaziland	3
TOG	Togo	3
YEM	Yemen	3
BIZ	Belize	2
BHU	Bhutan	2
DMA	Dominica	2
GEQ	Equatorial Guinea	2
GAM	The Gambia	2
LBR	Liberia	2
MTN	Mauritania	2
MYA	Myanmar	2
OMA	Oman	2
SKN	Saint Kitts and Nevis	2
LCA	Saint Lucia	2
STP	São Tomé and Príncipe	2
SLE	Sierra Leone	2
SOL	Solomon Islands	2
SOM	Somalia	2
TLS	Timor-Leste	2
VAN	Vanuatu	2
IVB	British Virgin Islands	1
BRU	Brunei	1
CHA	Chad	1
LIE	Liechtenstein	1

=== Sports ===
The sports featured at the 2004 Summer Olympics are listed below. Officially there were 301 events in 28 sports as swimming, diving, synchronised swimming and water polo are classified by the IOC as disciplines within the sport of aquatics, and wheelchair racing was a demonstration sport. For the first time, the wrestling category featured women's wrestling and in the fencing competition women competed in the sabre. American Kristin Heaston, who led off the qualifying round of women's shot put became the first woman to compete at the ancient site of Olympia.

The demonstration sport of wheelchair racing was a joint Olympic/Paralympic event, allowing a Paralympic event to occur within the Olympics, and for the future, opening up the wheelchair race to the able-bodied. The 2004 Summer Paralympics were also held in Athens, from 17 to 28 September.

2004 Summer Olympic Sports Programme
- Aquatics
  - Diving (8)
  - Swimming (32)
  - Synchronized swimming (2)
  - Water polo (2)
- Archery (4)
- Athletics (46)
- Badminton (5)
- Baseball (1)
- Basketball (2)
- Boxing (11)
- Canoeing
  - Sprint (12)
  - Slalom (4)
- Cycling
  - Road (4)
  - Track (12)
  - Mountain biking (2)
- Equestrian
  - Dressage (2)
  - Eventing (2)
  - Show jumping (2)
- Fencing (10)
- Field hockey (2)
- Football (2)
- Gymnastics
  - Artistic (14)
  - Rhythmic (2)
  - Trampoline (2)
- Handball (2)
- Judo (14)
- Modern pentathlon (2)
- Rowing (14)
- Sailing (11)
- Shooting (17)
- Softball (1)
- Table tennis (4)
- Taekwondo (8)
- Tennis (4)
- Triathlon (2)
- Volleyball
  - Volleyball (2)
  - Beach volleyball (2)
- Weightlifting (15)
- Wrestling
  - Freestyle (11)
  - Greco-Roman (7)

=== Gallery ===
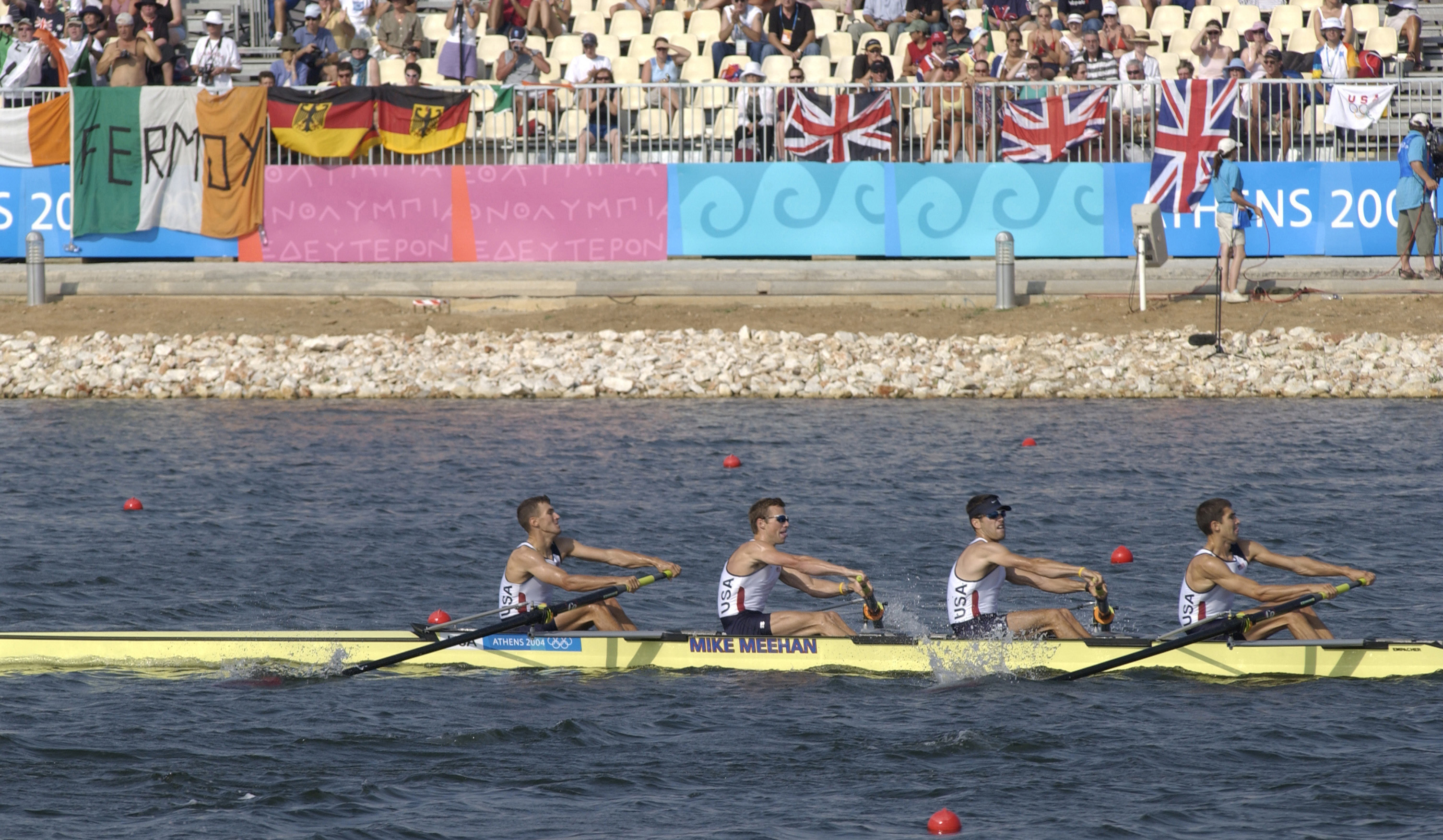
USA men's lightweight coxless four at Athens Olympics

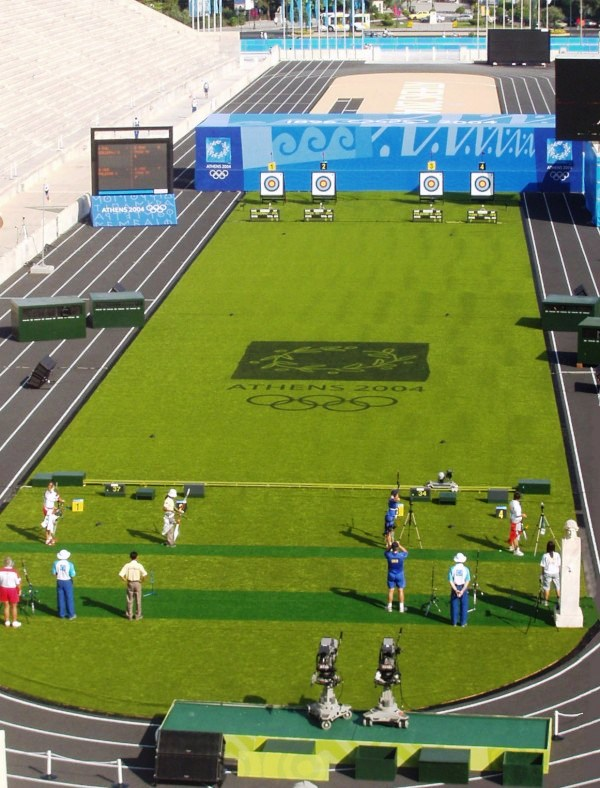
Archery rounds in the Panathenaic Stadium

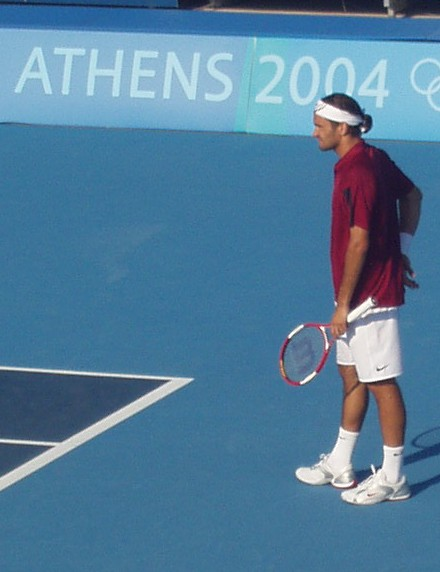
Roger Federer representing Switzerland in tennis

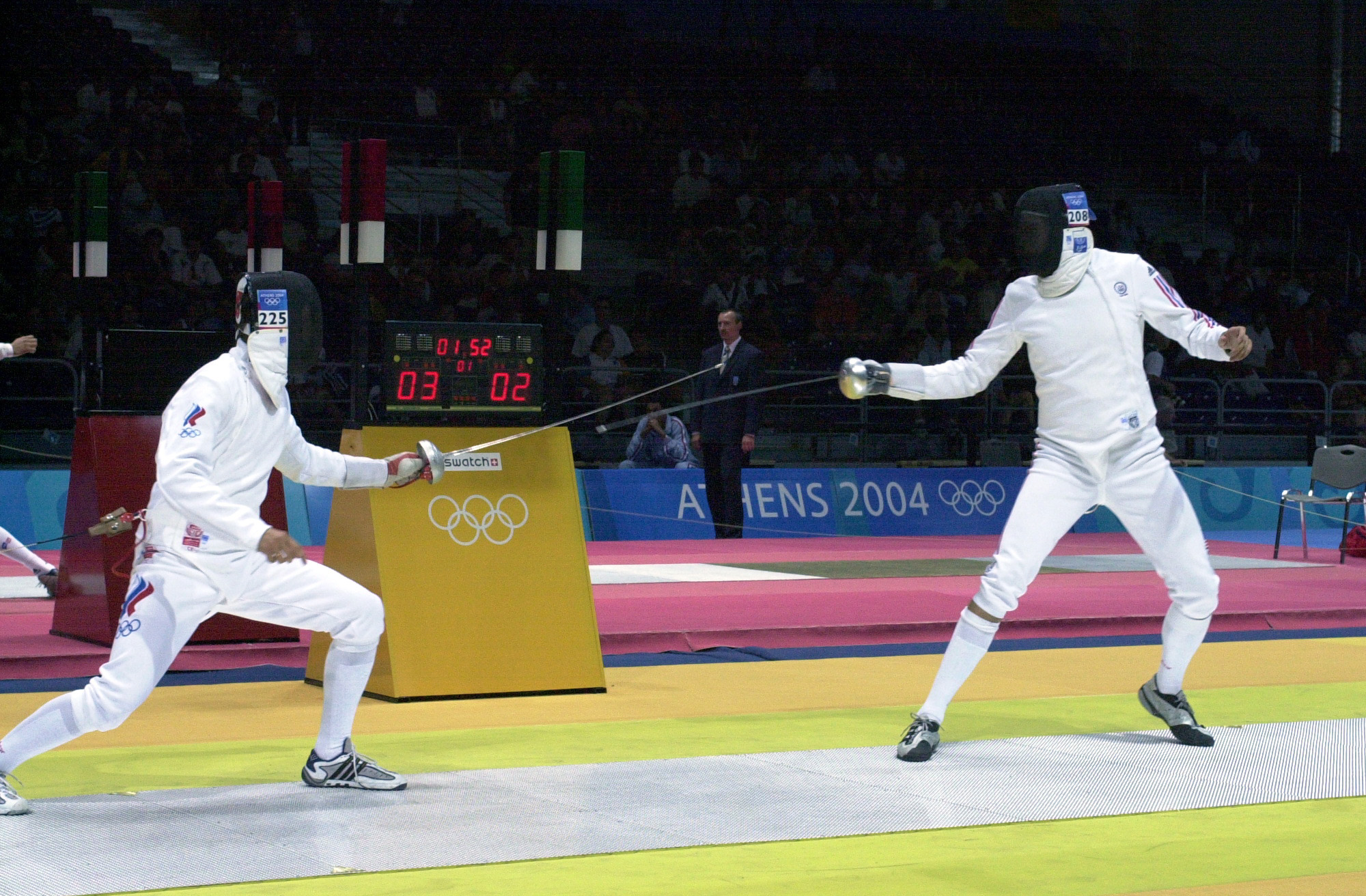
Russian Igor Turchin (left) and American Weston Kelsey (right) duel in second round of men's individual épée

=== Calendar ===
All times are in Eastern European Summer Time (UTC+3)

OC	Opening ceremony	●	Event competitions	1	Gold medal events	CC	Closing ceremony

August 2004		11th Wed	12th Thu	13th Fri	14th Sat	15th Sun	16th Mon	17th Tue	18th Wed	19th Thu	20th Fri	21st Sat	22nd Sun	23rd Mon	24th Tue	25th Wed	26th Thu	27th Fri	28th Sat	29th Sun	Events
Ceremonies				OC																CC	—N/a
Aquatics	Diving				2		2					●	1	●	1	●	1	●	1		44
Aquatics	Swimming				4	4	4	4	4	4	4	4									44
Aquatics	Synchronized swimming													●	●	1	●	1			44
Aquatics	Water polo					●	●	●	●	●	●	●	●	●	●	●	1	●		1	44
Archery						●	●	●	1	1	1	1									4
Athletics									2		2	3	5	6	6	3	3	7	8	1	46
Badminton					●	●	●	●	●	2	1	2									5
Baseball/Softball	Baseball					●	●	●	●		●	●	●		●	1					2
Baseball/Softball	Softball				●	●	●	●	●	●	●		●	1							2
Basketball					●	●	●	●	●	●	●	●	●	●	●	●	●	●	2		2
Boxing					●	●	●	●	●	●	●	●	●	●	●	●		●	5	6	11
Canoeing	Slalom							●	2	●	2										16
Canoeing	Sprint													●	●	●	●	6	6		16
Cycling	Road cycling				1	1			2												18
Cycling	Track cycling										2	2	1	1	3	3					18
Cycling	Mountain biking																	1	1		18
Equestrian						●	●	●	2		●	1	●	●	●	1		2			6
Fencing					1	1	1	2	1	1	1	1	1								10
Field hockey					●	●	●	●	●	●	●	●	●	●	●	●	1	1			2
Football		●	●		●	●		●	●		●	●		●	●		1	●	1		2
Gymnastics	Artistic				●	●	1	1	1	1			5	5							18
Gymnastics	Rhythmic																●	●	1	1	18
Gymnastics	Trampoline										1	1									18
Handball					●	●	●	●	●	●	●	●	●	●	●		●	●	●	2	2
Judo					2	2	2	2	2	2	2										14
Modern pentathlon																	1	1			2
Rowing					●	●	●	●	●	●		7	7								14
Sailing					●	●	●	●	●	●	1	3	2	●	●	2	1		2		11
Shooting					2	2	2	2	2	2	2	1	2								17
Table tennis					●	●	●	●	●	●	1	1	1	1							4
Taekwondo																	2	2	2	2	8
Tennis						●	●	●	●	●	●	2	2								4
Triathlon																1	1				2
Volleyball	Beach volleyball					●	●	●	●	●	●	●	●	●	1	1					4
Volleyball	Indoor volleyball				●	●	●	●	●	●	●	●	●	●	●	●	●	●	1	1	4
Weightlifting					1	2	2		2	2	2	1		1	1	1					15
Wrestling													●	4	●	4	3	●	4	3	14
Daily medal events					13	12	14	11	21	15	22	30	27	19	12	18	15	21	34	17	301
Cumulative total					13	25	39	50	71	86	108	138	165	184	196	214	229	250	284	301	301
August 2004		11th Wed	12th Thu	13th Fri	14th Sat	15th Sun	16th Mon	17th Tue	18th Wed	19th Thu	20th Fri	21st Sat	22nd Sun	23rd Mon	24th Tue	25th Wed	26th Thu	27th Fri	28th Sat	29th Sun	Events

=== Highlights ===
- In the men's football group stage game where Serbia and Montenegro faced Tunisia, a penalty taken by Tunisia had to be retaken five times.
- Greek sprinters Konstantinos Kenteris and Ekaterini Thanou withdraw from the games after allegedly staging a motorcycle accident in order to avoid a drug test.
- The United Arab Emirates received its first Olympic medal when Sheikh Ahmed Al-Maktoum, a distant relative of the Emir of Dubai, won gold in shooting in the double trap event. He also finished fourth in the trap event.
- The shot put event was held in ancient Olympia, site of the ancient Olympic Games (this was the very first time women athletes competed in Ancient Olympia), while the archery competition and the men's and women's marathon finish were held in the Panathenaic Stadium, in which the 1896 Games were held.
- Kiribati and Timor Leste participated in the Olympic Games for the first time.
- Women's wrestling and women's sabre made their Olympic debut at the 2004 Games.
- With 6 gold, 6 silver, and 4 bronze medals, Greece had its best medal tally in over 100 years (since hosting the 1896 Olympics), continuing the nation's sporting success after winning Euro 2004 in July.
- The marathon was held on the same route as the 1896 Games, beginning in the site of the Battle of Marathon to the Panathenaic Stadium in Athens.
- Australia became the first country in Olympic history to win more gold medals (17) immediately after hosting the Olympics in Sydney 2000 where they won 16 gold medals.
- World record holder and strong favourite Paula Radcliffe of Britain, crashed out of the women's marathon in spectacular fashion, leaving Japan's Mizuki Noguchi to win the gold.
- While leading in the men's marathon with less than 10 kilometres to go, Brazilian runner Vanderlei Cordeiro de Lima was attacked by Irish priest Neil Horan and dragged into the crowd. De Lima recovered to take bronze, and was later awarded the Pierre de Coubertin Medal for sportsmanship. Twelve years later, at the opening ceremony of the 2016 Summer Olympics, he lit the Olympic Cauldron at Maracanã Stadium.
- British athlete Kelly Holmes won gold in the 800 m and 1500 m.
- Liu Xiang won the first gold medal in men's track and field for China in the 110 m hurdles, equalling Colin Jackson's 1993 World Record time of 12.91 seconds.
- Kenyan runners swept the medals in the 3000 meters steeple chase.
- The Olympics saw Afghanistan's first return to the Games since 1996 (it was banned due to the Taliban's extremist attitudes towards women, but was reinstated in 2002).
- Hicham El Guerrouj wins gold in the 1500 m and 5000 m. He was the first person to accomplish this feat at the Olympics since Paavo Nurmi in 1924.
- Greek athlete Fani Halkia came out of retirement to win the 400 m hurdles.
- The US women's 4 × 200 m swimming team of Natalie Coughlin, Carly Piper, Dana Vollmer and Kaitlin Sandeno won gold, smashing the long-standing world record set by the German Democratic Republic in 1987.
- Argentina beat Italy 84–69 in the men's basketball final for their first gold medal in the sport.
- Windsurfer Gal Fridman won Israel's first-ever gold medal.
- Dominican athlete Félix Sánchez won the first gold medal for the Dominican Republic in the 400 m hurdles event.
- German kayaker Birgit Fischer won gold in the K-4 500 m and silver in the K-2 500 m. In so doing, she became the first woman in any sport to win gold medals at 6 different Olympics, the first woman to win gold 24 years apart and the first person in Olympic history to win two or more medals in five different Games.
- Swimmer Michael Phelps became the first athlete to win 8 medals (6 gold and 2 bronze) in non-boycotted Olympics.
- United States' gymnast Carly Patterson became the second American woman to win the all-around gold medal, and the first American woman to win the all-around competition at a non-boycotted Olympic Games.
- Chilean Tennis players Nicolás Massu and Fernando Gonzalez won the gold medal in the Doubles Competition, while Massu won the gold and Gonzalez the bronze on the Singles competition. These were Chile's first-ever gold medals. With these victories, Massú became the thirteenth Tennis player (and the eighth male player) in history to have won the gold medal in both the Singles and Doubles Competition during the same Olympic Games. He also became the second Tennis player, and first male player, to have achieved this feat in modern Olympic Tennis (1988 onwards). The first player to do so was Venus Williams in 2000.
- Usain Bolt of Jamaica, in his first career Olympic Games, finished fifth in his 200m dash heat in 21.05 seconds, failing to qualify for the second round. In the years to come, he would go on to become the world's fastest man, with multiple world records in the 100m, 200m and 4 × 100 m and a medal count of over 29 global medals, including 8 Olympic gold medals and 11 World Championships gold medals.

=== Closing ceremony ===
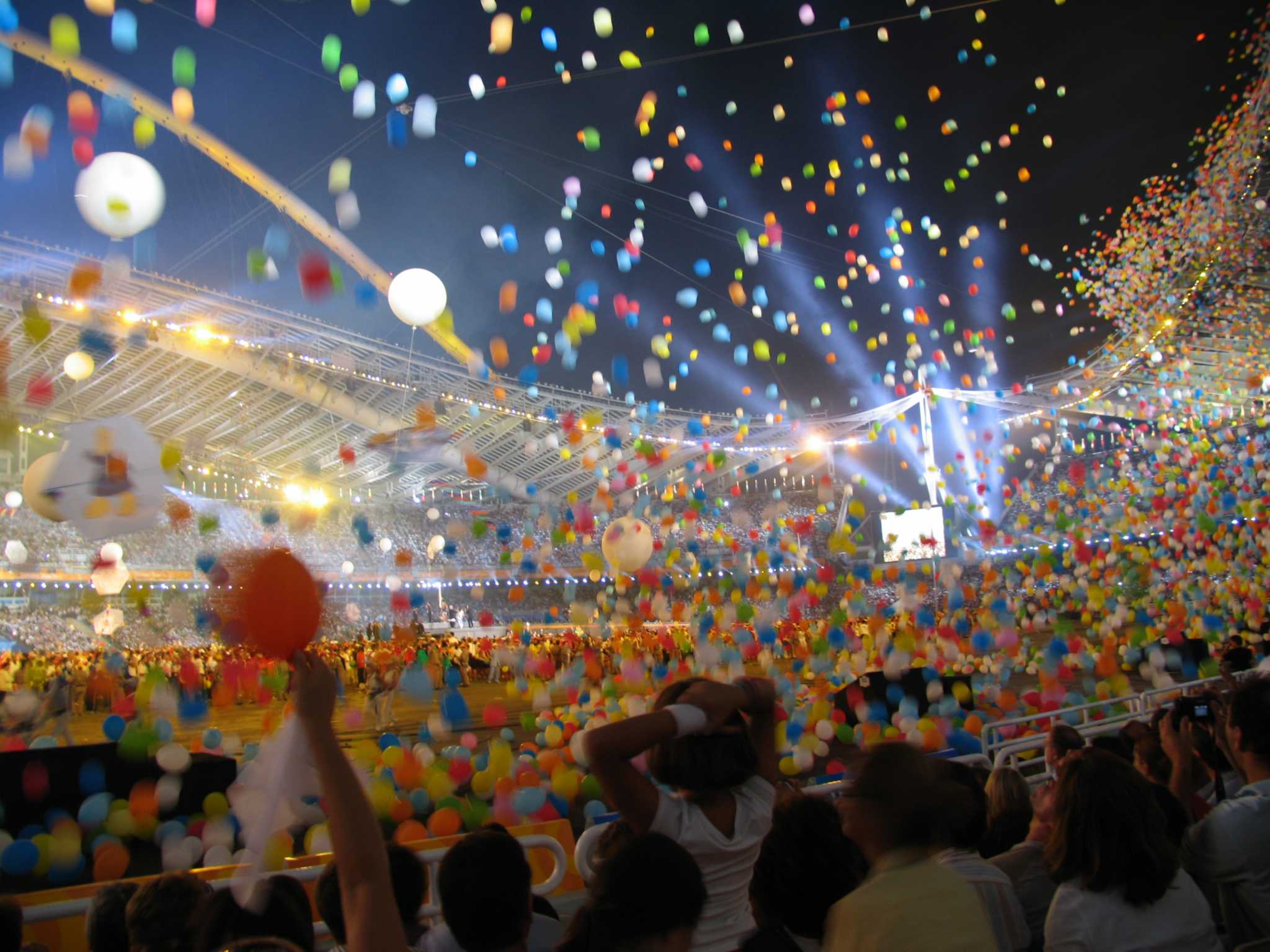
Balloons falling at the Athens 2004 Olympics closing ceremony

The Games were concluded on 29 August 2004. The closing ceremony was held at the Athens Olympic Stadium, where the Games had been opened 16 days earlier. Around 70,000 people gathered in the stadium to watch the ceremony.

The initial part of the ceremony interspersed the performances of various Greek singers, and featured traditional Greek dance performances from various regions of Greece (Crete, Thessaly, etc.). The event was meant to highlight the pride of the Greeks in their culture and country for the world to see.

A significant part of the closing ceremony was the exchange of the Olympic flag of the Athens Games between the mayor of Athens and the mayor of Beijing, host city of the next Olympics. After the flag exchange a presentation from the Beijing delegation presented a glimpse into Chinese culture for the world to see. Beijing University students (who were at first incorrectly cited as the Twelve Girls Band) sang Mo Li Hua (Jasmine Flower) accompanied by a ribbon dancer, then some male dancers did a routine with tai chi and acrobatics, followed by dancers from the Peking Opera and finally, a little Chinese girl Chen Tianjia singing a reprise of Mo Li Hua and concluded the presentation by saying "Welcome to Beijing!"

The medal ceremony for the last event of the Olympics, the men's marathon, was conducted, with Stefano Baldini from Italy as the winner. The bronze medal winner, Vanderlei Cordeiro de Lima of Brazil, was simultaneously announced as a recipient of the Pierre de Coubertin Medal for his bravery in finishing the race despite being attacked by a rogue spectator while leading with 7 km to go.

A flag-bearer from each nation's delegation then entered along the stage, followed by the competitors en masse on the floor. All of them were led by Pyrros Dimas (weightlifter) and Liu Xiang (hurdler).

Short speeches were presented by Gianna Angelopoulos-Daskalaki, president of the organising committee, and by president Dr. Jacques Rogge of the IOC, in which he described the Athens Olympics as "unforgettable, dream Games".

Dr. Rogge had previously declared he would be breaking with tradition in his closing speech as president of the IOC and that he would never use the words of his predecessor Juan Antonio Samaranch, who used to always say 'these were the best ever games'. Dr. Rogge had described Salt Lake City 2002 as "superb games" and in turn would continue after Athens 2004 and describe Turin 2006 as "truly magnificent games."

The national anthems of Greece and China were played in a handover ceremony as both nations' flags were raised. The mayor of Athens, Dora Bakoyianni, passed the Olympic Flag to the mayor of Beijing, Wang Qishan. After a short cultural performance by Chinese actors, dancers, and musicians directed by eminent Chinese director Zhang Yimou, Rogge declared the 2004 Olympic Games closed. The Olympic flag was next raised again on 10 February 2006 during the opening ceremony of the next Winter Olympics in Torino.

A young Greek girl, 10-year-old Fotini Papaleonidopoulou, lit a symbolic lantern with the Olympic Flame and passed it on to other children before "extinguishing" the flame in the cauldron by blowing a puff of air. The ceremony ended with a variety of musical performances by Greek singers, including Dionysis Savvopoulos, George Dalaras, Haris Alexiou, Anna Vissi, Sakis Rouvas, Eleftheria Arvanitaki, Alkistis Protopsalti, Antonis Remos, Michalis Hatzigiannis, Marinella, and Dimitra Galani, as thousands of athletes carried out symbolic displays on the stadium floor.

== Medal table ==
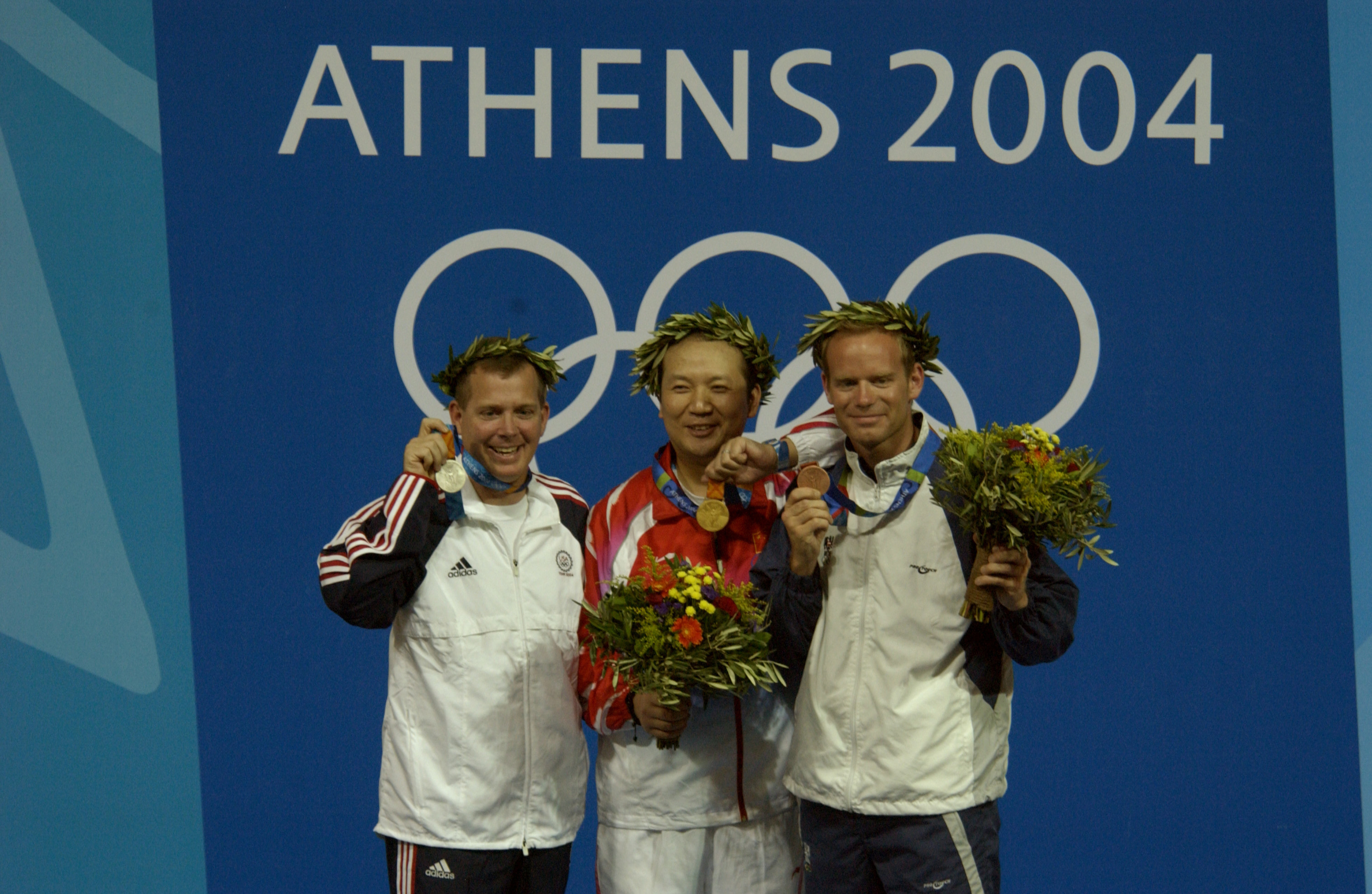
Army Maj. Zhanbo Jia from China (center) took the gold medal in the Men's 50m Three-Position Rifle, Michael Anti from the United States (left) took the Silver and Christian Planer (right) from Austria took the Bronze

These are the top ten nations that won medals in the 2004 Games.

Key

‡ Changes in medal standings (see here)

* Host nation (Greece)

2004 Summer Olympics medal table (Note: Figures in table reflect all official changes in medal standings.)
Rank	NOC	Gold	Silver	Bronze	Total
1	United States‡	36	39	26	101
2	China	32	17	14	63
3	Russia‡	28	26	36	90
4	Australia‡	17	16	17	50
5	Japan‡	16	9	12	37
6	Germany‡	13	16	20	49
7	France	11	9	13	33
8	Italy	10	11	11	32
9	South Korea	9	12	9	30
10	Great Britain	9	9	12	30
11–74	Remaining NOCs	120	136	155	411
Totals (74 entries)		301	300	325	926

== Venues ==
Facilities of the 2004 Summer Olympics in the Greater Athens area. Navigate the map for other facilities.

=== OAKA ===
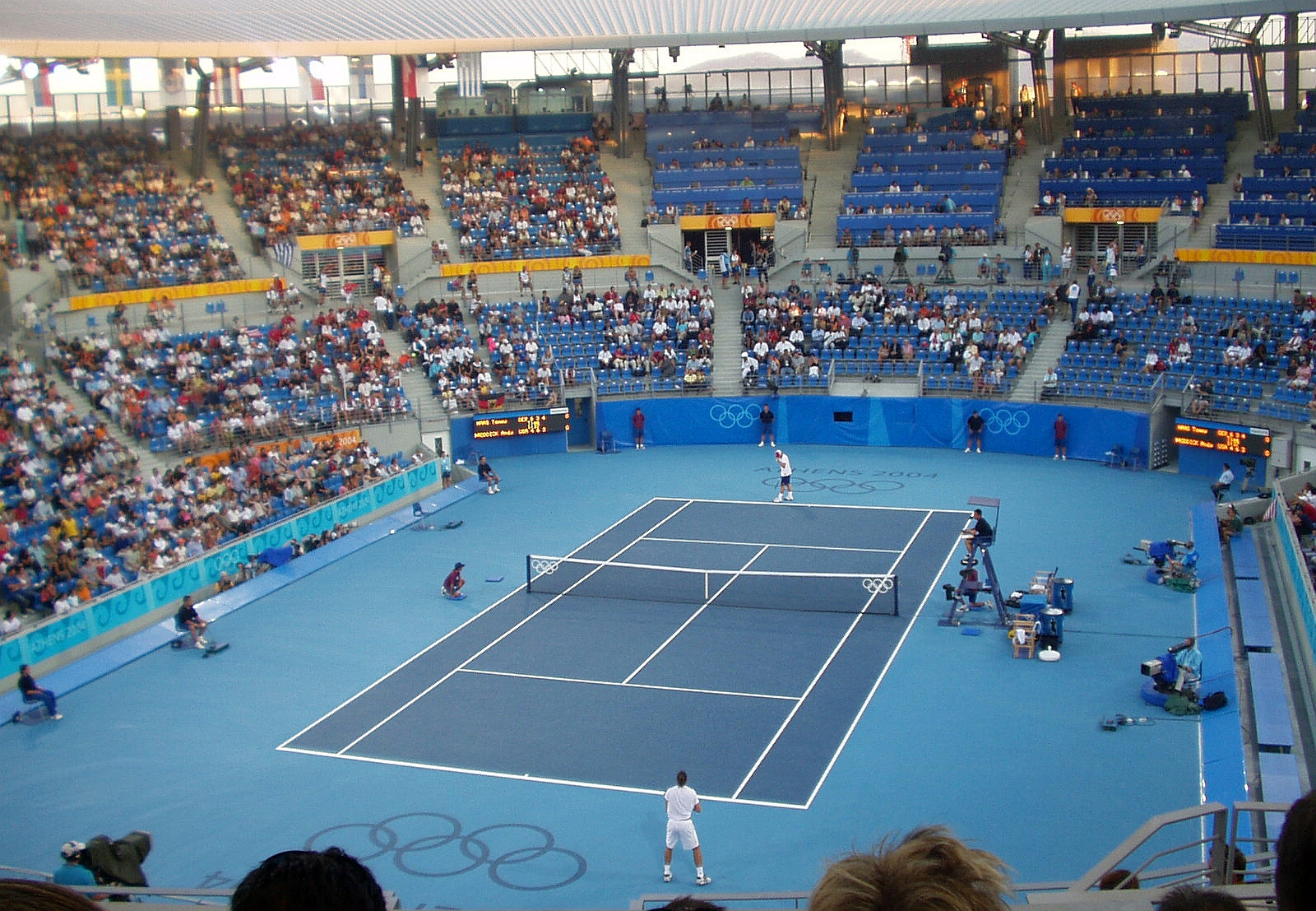
Athens Olympic Tennis Centre

- Athens Olympic Aquatic Centre – diving, swimming, synchronized swimming, water polo
- Athens Olympic Tennis Centre – tennis
- Athens Olympic Velodrome – cycling (track)
- Olympic Indoor Hall – basketball (final), gymnastics (artistic, trampolining)
- Olympic Stadium – ceremonies (opening/ closing), athletics, football (final)

=== HOC ===
- Fencing Hall – fencing
- Helliniko Indoor Arena – basketball, handball (final)
- Olympic Baseball Centre – baseball
- Olympic Canoe/Kayak Slalom Centre – canoeing (slalom)
- Olympic Hockey Centre – field hockey
- Olympic Softball Stadium – softball

=== Faliro ===
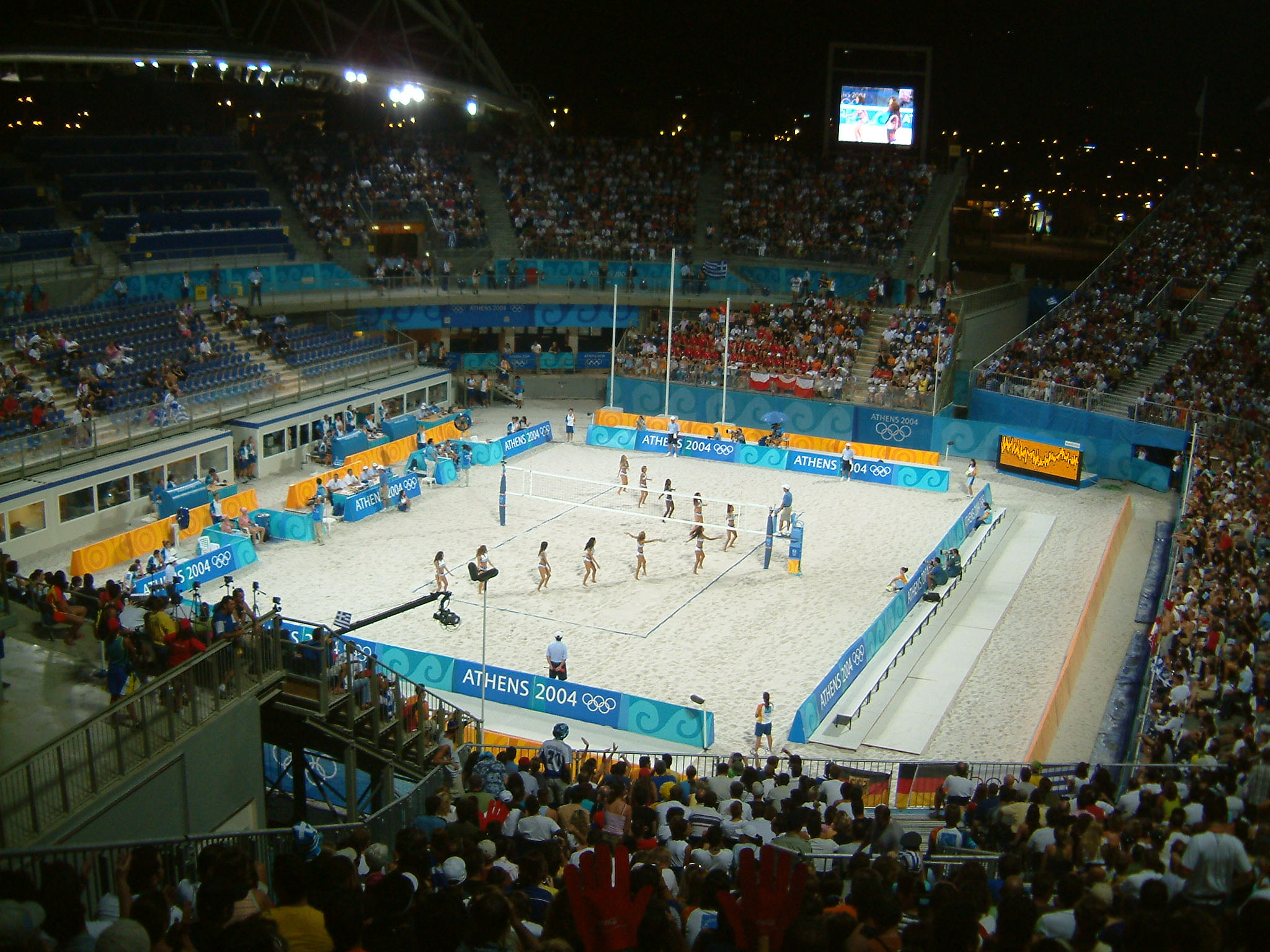
Faliro Olympic Beach Volleyball Centre hosting beach volleyball

- Faliro Olympic Beach Volleyball Centre – volleyball (beach)
- Faliro Sports Pavilion Arena – handball, taekwondo
- Peace and Friendship Stadium – volleyball (indoor)

=== GOC ===
- Goudi Olympic Hall – badminton
- Olympic Modern Pentathlon Centre – modern pentathlon

=== MOC ===
- Markopoulo Olympic Equestrian Centre – equestrian
- Markopoulo Olympic Shooting Centre – shooting

=== Football venues ===
- Kaftanzoglio Stadium (Thessaloniki)
- Karaiskakis Stadium (Piraeus)
- Pampeloponnisiako Stadium (Patras)
- Pankritio Stadium (Heraklion)
- Panthessaliko Stadium (Volos)

=== Other venues ===
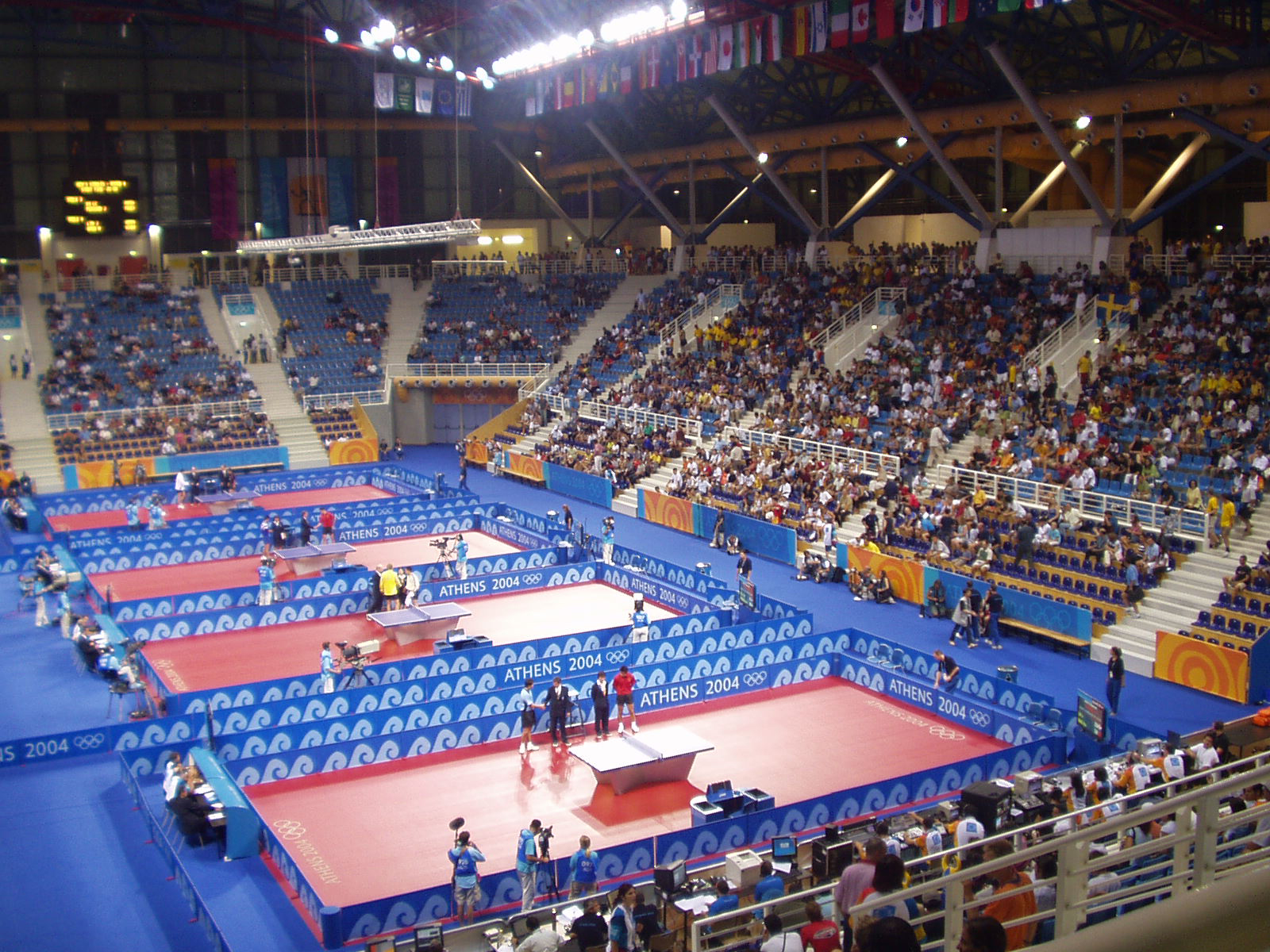
Galatsi Olympic Hall hosted gymnastics (rhythmic) and table tennis

- Agios Kosmas Olympic Sailing Centre – sailing
- Ano Liosia Olympic Hall – judo, wrestling
- Galatsi Olympic Hall – gymnastics (rhythmic), table tennis
- Kotzia Square – cycling (individual road race)
- Marathon (city) – athletics (marathon start)
- Nikaia Olympic Weightlifting Hall – weightlifting
- Panathenaic Stadium – archery, athletics (marathons finish)
- Peristeri Olympic Boxing Hall – boxing
- Schinias Olympic Rowing and Canoeing Centre – canoeing (sprint), rowing
- Stadium at Olympia – athletics (shot put)
- Vouliagmeni Olympic Centre – cycling (individual time trial), triathlon

== Marketing ==
=== Mascots ===
Mascots have been a tradition at the Olympic Games since the 1968 Winter Olympics in Grenoble, France. The 2004 Olympics had two official mascots: Athena and Phevos (Greek pronunciation: Athina and Fivos). The sister and brother were named after Athena, the goddess of wisdom, strategy and Phoebus, the god of light and music, respectively. They were inspired by the ancient daidala, which were toy dolls that also had religious connotations.

=== Sponsors ===
Sponsors of the 2004 Summer Olympics
Worldwide Olympic Partners
- Atos Origin
- Coca-Cola
- John Hancock Financial
- Kodak
- McDonald's
- Panasonic
- Samsung Electronics
- Sports Illustrated
- Swatch
- Visa Inc.
- Xerox
Grand Sponsors
- Alpha Bank
- Delta-Fage
- Heineken N.V.
- Hellenic Broadcasting Corporation
- Hellenic Post
- Hellenic Telecommunications Organisation
- Hyundai Motor Company
- Olympic Airlines
- Public Power Corporation
Official Supporters
- ABB-Areva-Diekat-Siemens
- Adidas
- Cleaning and Waste Services
- General Electric
- Jet Set Sports
- Shell plc
- Ticketmaster
Official Providers
- Altec-Info-Quest-Intracom Holdings-PC Systems
- DB Schenker
- Mizuno Corporation
- Mondo
- Technogym

== Legacy ==
To commemorate the 2004 Olympics, a series of Greek high value euro collectors' coins were minted by the Mint of Greece, in both silver and gold. The pieces depict landmarks in Greece as well as ancient and modern sports on the obverse of the coin. On the reverse, a common motif with the logo of the Games, circled by an olive branch representing the spirit of the Games.

Preparations to stage the Olympics led to a number of positive developments for the city's infrastructure. These improvements included the establishment of Eleftherios Venizelos International Airport, a modern new international airport serving as Greece's main aviation gateway; expansions to the Athens Metro system; the "Tram", a new metropolitan tram (light rail) system system; the "Proastiakos", a new suburban railway system linking the airport and suburban towns to the city of Athens; the "Attiki Odos", a new toll motorway encircling the city, and the conversion of streets into pedestrianized walkways in the historic center of Athens which link several of the city's main tourist sites, including the Parthenon and the Panathenaic Stadium (the site of the first modern Olympic Games in 1896). All of the above infrastructure is still in use to this day, and there have been continued expansions and proposals to expand Athens' metro, tram, suburban rail and motorway network, the airport, as well as further plans to pedestrianize more thoroughfares in the historic center of Athens.

The Greek Government has created a corporation, Olympic Properties SA, which is overseeing the post-Olympics management, development and conversion of these facilities, some of which will be sold off (or have already been sold off) to the private sector, while some other facilities are still in use, or have been converted for commercial use or modified for other sports.

As of 2012 many conversion schemes have stalled owing to the Greek government-debt crisis, though many of these facilities are now under the control of domestic sporting clubs and organizations or the private sector.

Ongoing maintenance costs for the facilities were problematic due to the Greek government-debt crisis, leading to facilities falling into disrepair, and, according to reports during the crisis period, many Greek Olympians at the time chose to train in Cyprus instead, owing to its then superior facilities. The Hellinikon Olympic Complex saw multiple venues demolished and the park is being transformed into Hellinikon Metropolitan Park which will become home to Hard Rock Hotel & Casino Athens, the first integrated resort in Greece.

The legacy of the facilities is also debated: although many facilities had plans for post-games utilisation, many of these plans never materialised, while questions remain about whether the initially limited post-games usage of certain facilities is outweighed by the significant initial expenditure on the facilities, alongside the ongoing maintenance costs (such arguments were mostly presented during the country's debt crisis, which had affected many aspects of its functions).

The table below delineates the current status of the Athens Olympic facilities:

Facility	Olympics use	Current/Proposed use
Athens Olympic Stadium (OAKA)	Opening and closing ceremonies, Track & Field, Football	Home pitch for Panathinaikos, AEK Athens (football; Super League Greece, UEFA Champions League), Greece national football team (some matches), International football competitions; Track & Field events (e.g. IAAF Athens Grand Prix), Concerts
Athens Olympic Indoor Hall	Basketball, Gymnastics	Home court for Panathinaikos BC and AEK BC (Greek basketball league); Greece men's national basketball team, International basketball competitions, Concerts
Athens Olympic Aquatic Centre	Swimming, Diving, Synchronized Swimming, Water Polo	Domestic and international swimming meets, Public pool, domestic league and European water-polo games.
Athens Olympic Tennis Centre	Tennis	Domestic and international tennis matches, training courts open to the public and home of the Athens Tennis Academy, currently the best-kept facility in the complex
Athens Olympic Velodrome	Cycling	Domestic and international cycling meets
Peace and Friendship Stadium	Volleyball	Home court for Olympiacos BC (basketball), Concerts, Conventions and trade shows
Helliniko Olympic Indoor Arena	Basketball, Handball	Home court for Panionios BC (basketball), Conventions and trade shows
Hellinikon Canoe/Kayak Slalom Centre	Canoe/Kayak	Turned over to a private consortium (J&P AVAX, GEP, Corfu Waterparks and BIOTER). Plans to convert it to a water park never materialised, and as of 2014 it sits abandoned.
Hellinikon Olympic Hockey Centre	Field Hockey	Originally planned to be part of new Hellinikon metropolitan park complex, but these plans never materialised. As of 2017, abandoned, and with damaged turf.
Hellinikon Baseball Stadium	Baseball	Currently abandoned. Main ground (no. 1) initially converted to football pitch, home field of Ethnikos Piraeus F.C. (Football; Greek second division), auxiliary ground (no. 2) abandoned. In 2014, Ethnikos Piraeus F.C. moved grounds to the Peace And Friendship stadium, leaving the main ground abandoned.
Hellinikon Softball Stadium	Softball	Abandoned
Agios Kosmas Olympic Sailing Centre	Sailing	Currently out of use, turned over to the private sector (Seirios AE), will become marina with 1,000+ yacht capacity and will be part of Athens' revitalized waterfront
Ano Liosia Olympic Hall	Judo, Wrestling	TV filming facility, Future home of the Hellenic Academy of Culture and Hellenic Digital Archive
Olympic Beach Volleyball Centre	Beach Volleyball	Concert and theater venue, it hosted Helena Paparizou's concert on 13 August 2005 to celebrate the first anniversary of the Olympic Games. Plans to turn it into an ultra-modern outdoor theatre never materialised, and as of 2024, the facility stands abandoned and vandalised.
Faliro Sports Pavilion	Handball, Taekwondo	Converted to the Athens International Convention Center, hosts concerts, conventions and trade shows
Galatsi Olympic Hall	Table Tennis, Rhythmic Gymnastics	After 2004, was the home court of AEK BC (basketball) before the team moved to the Athens Olympic Indoor Hall. Turned over to the private sector (Acropol Haragionis AE and Sonae Sierra SGPS S.A), being converted to a shopping mall and retail/entertainment complex.
Goudi Olympic Complex	Badminton, Modern Pentathlon	Now the site of the ultra-modern Badminton Theater, hosting major theatrical productions
Markopoulo Olympic Equestrian Centre	Equestrian	Horse racing, Domestic and International Equestrian meets, Auto racing (rallye)
Markopoulo Olympic Shooting Centre	Shooting	Converted to the official shooting range and training center of the Hellenic Police.
Nikaia Olympic Weightlifting Hall	Weightlifting	Has hosted fencing competitions in the years following the Olympics, but has recently been turned over to the University of Piraeus for use as an academic lecture and conference center.
Parnitha Olympic Mountain Bike Venue	Mountain Biking	Part of the Parnitha National Park. In public use for biking and hiking.
Peristeri Olympic Boxing Hall	Boxing	Partially converted to a football pitch, also in use for gymnastics competitions.
Schinias Olympic Rowing and Canoeing Centre	Rowing and Canoeing	One of only three FISA-approved training centers in the world, the others being in Munich and Seville. Hosts mainly domestic rowing and canoeing meetings. Part of the Schinias National Park, completely reconstructed by the German company Hochtief.
Vouliagmeni Olympic Centre	Triathlon	Temporary facility, not in existence presently.
Kaftanzoglio Stadium	Football	Home pitch for Iraklis (football; Super League Greece) and temporary home pitch for Apollon Kalamarias FC (football; Greek second division). Also in use for track and field meets. Hosted the 2007 Greek football All-Star Game.
Karaiskakis Stadium	Football	Home pitch for Olympiacos (football; Super League Greece) and for the Greece National Football team. Also used as a concert venue.
Pampeloponnisiako Stadium	Football	Home pitch for Panahaiki (football; Greek third division). Also used for various track-and-field events, concerts, conventions, and friendly matches of the Greece National Football Team.
Pankritio Stadium	Football	Home pitch for OFI and Ergotelis (football; Greek Super League). Hosted the 2005 Greek football All-Star game. Also home to various track-and-field meets.
Panthessaliko Stadium	Football	Home pitch for Niki Volos (football; Greek third division). Has also hosted concerts, conventions and track-and-field meets.
Panathinaiko Stadium	Marathon, Archery	Site of the first modern Olympic Games in 1896. One of Athens' major tourist attractions, also used for occasional sporting and concert events.
The Ancient Stadium at Olympia	Track and Field	One of Greece's historic sites and largest tourist attractions, open to the public to this day.
International Broadcast Centre (IBC)	International Broadcast Centre	Half of it (the section fronting Kifissias Avenue) has been turned over to the private company Lambda Development SA and has been converted to a luxury shopping, retail, office and entertainment complex known as the "Golden Hall". The remaining section, facing the Olympic Stadium itself, will become home to the Hellenic Olympic Museum and the International Museum of Classical Athletics.
Olympic Athletes' Village	Housing	2,292 apartments were sold to low-income individuals and today the village is home to over 8,000 residents. Several communal installations however are abandoned and heavily vandalised. Only half of the apartments were ever sold, and significantly fewer schools ended up being built than initially promised, thereby resulting in residents facing significant journeys to take their children to schools. Most of the shops to serve the village's residents closed within months of the Olympics finishing, and concerns were raised over sewage, damp and building material quality.
Olympic Press Village	Housing	It has been turned over to the private sector and namely Lamda Developments S.A. (the same company which owns and runs the Mall of Athens and the Golden Hall), and has been converted to luxury flats.

=== Arguments about possible effects on Greece's debt crisis ===
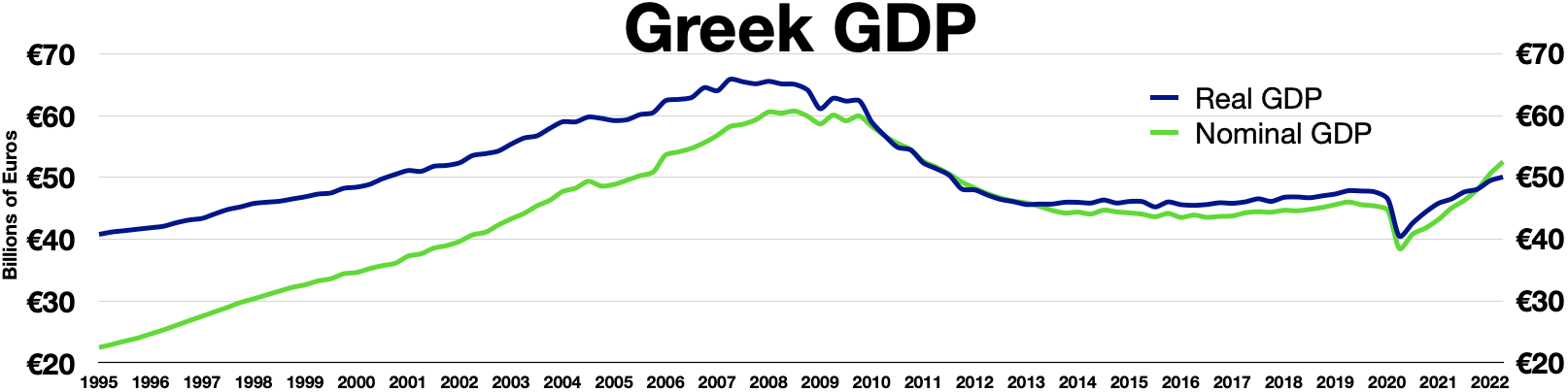
Greek GDP Real Quarterly GDP (chained 2010 Euros) Nominal Quarterly GDP

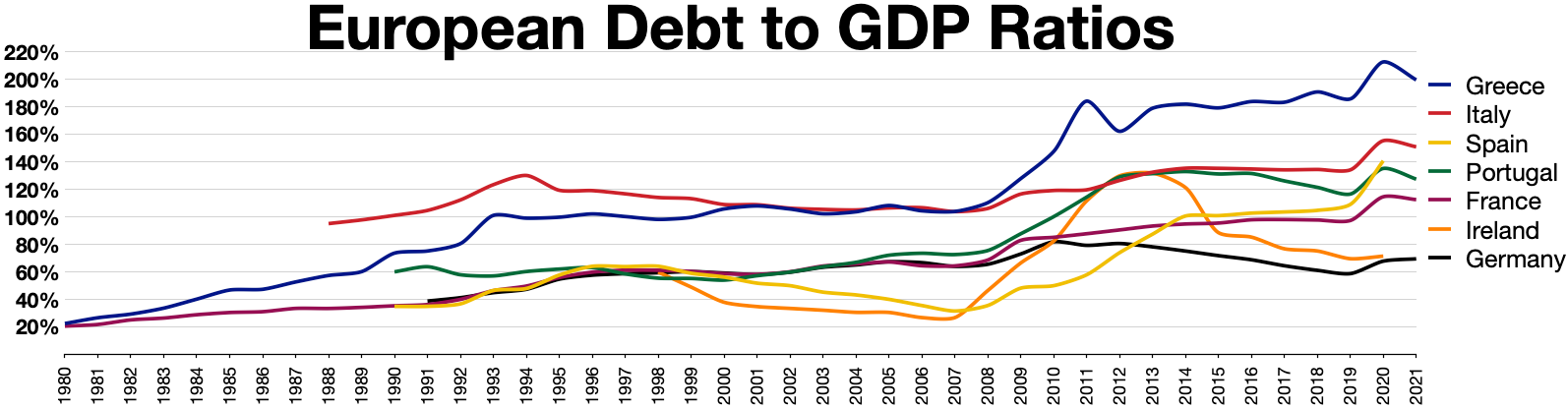
European debt to GDP ratios Greece Italy Spain Portugal France Ireland Germany

There have been arguments (mostly in popular media) that the cost of the 2004 Athens Summer Games was a contributor to the Greek government-debt crisis that started in 2010, while a lot of focus has been on the use of the facilities after the Games. This argument contradicts the fact that Greece's Debt to GDP ratio was essentially not affected until the 2008 financial crisis, while according to Olympic officials and some financial experts, the cost of the Games, which was spread over years of preparation, was insignificant compared to Greece's GDP and public debt.

Furthermore, the aforementioned arguments do not even take into account the profits (direct and indirect) generated by the Games, which may well have surpassed the above costs. Finally, popular arguments about "rotting" of many of the facilities, appear to ignore the actual utilization of many of these structures. On the other hand, the general government's deficit increase between 2000 and 2004 from 4.1% to 8.8% was a result of multiple factors and, until 2008, the effect of Greece's chronic - and widely fluctuating - deficits was counterbalanced by high GDP growth rates, leaving the Debt to GDP ratio essentially unaffected - see chart).

== See also ==
- 2004 Summer Paralympics
- Olympic Games held in Greece
  - 1896 Summer Olympics – Athens
  - 2004 Summer Olympics – Athens
- List of IOC country codes
- List of 2004 Summer Olympics medal winners
- Olympic records at the 2004 Summer Olympics
- Use of performance-enhancing drugs in the Olympic Games – 2004 Athens
- World records at the 2004 Summer Olympics

== Notes ==
Summer Olympics
Preceded by Sydney	XXVIII Olympiad; Athens; 2004	Succeeded by Beijing
