= Olympic Modern Pentathlon Centre =

Sports venue in Athens, Greece

Coordinates: 37.98631°N 23.77489°E

The Olympic Modern Pentathlon Centre was the site of the modern pentathlon events at the 2004 Summer Olympics in Athens, Greece. The venue seats 2,500 for the swimming part of the competition, 5,000 for the riding and running parts each, and 3,000 for the fencing and shooting. Construction at the facility was completed on 30 May 2004 and it was officially opened exactly two months later.

This venue is located in the Goudi Olympic Complex. It hosted a modern pentathlon World Cup event in 2005.
