= Faliro Olympic Beach Volleyball Centre =

Beach volleyball stadium in Athens, Greece

Coordinates: 37°56′26.26″N 23°40′57.63″E

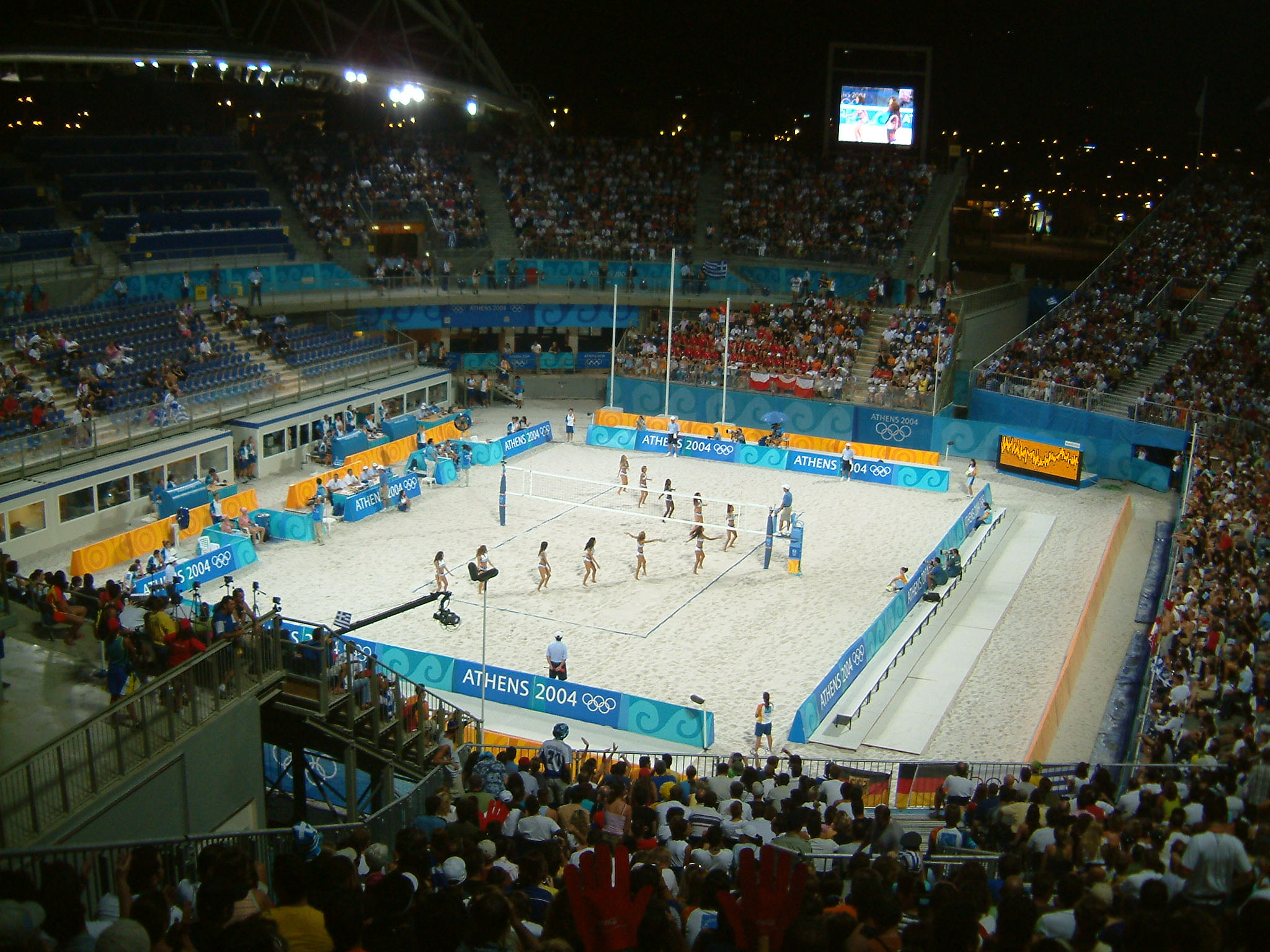
During the 2004 Olympics

The Faliro Olympic Beach Volleyball Centre is a stadium in the Faliro Coastal Zone Olympic Complex that hosted the beach volleyball competition for the 2004 Summer Olympics in Athens, Greece. The stadium holds a total of 9,600 individuals, though the public seating capacity was limited to 7,300 during the Olympics. The stadium was officially opened on August 2, 2004, a few weeks before the Olympics, though test events were held at the site a year earlier.

== After the Olympics ==
As of August 2014, the venue was in a state of disuse, and was overgrown with plants.

On May 8, 2016 Hellenic Parliament passed law by which Centre was given to Ministry of Justice, Transparency and Human Rights. The stadium is proposed to become rebuilt to a courtroom.

== See also ==
- Faliro Coastal Zone Olympic Complex
