= Volleyball at the 2004 Summer Olympics =

Volleyball at the Games of the XXVIII Olympiad
- Pictograms for indoor (left) and beach volleyball (right)
- Venue: Peace and Friendship Stadium (indoor); Faliro Olympic Beach Volleyball Centre (beach)
- Dates: 14 – 29 August 2004
- Competitors: 384 (192 men, 192 women) from 31 nations

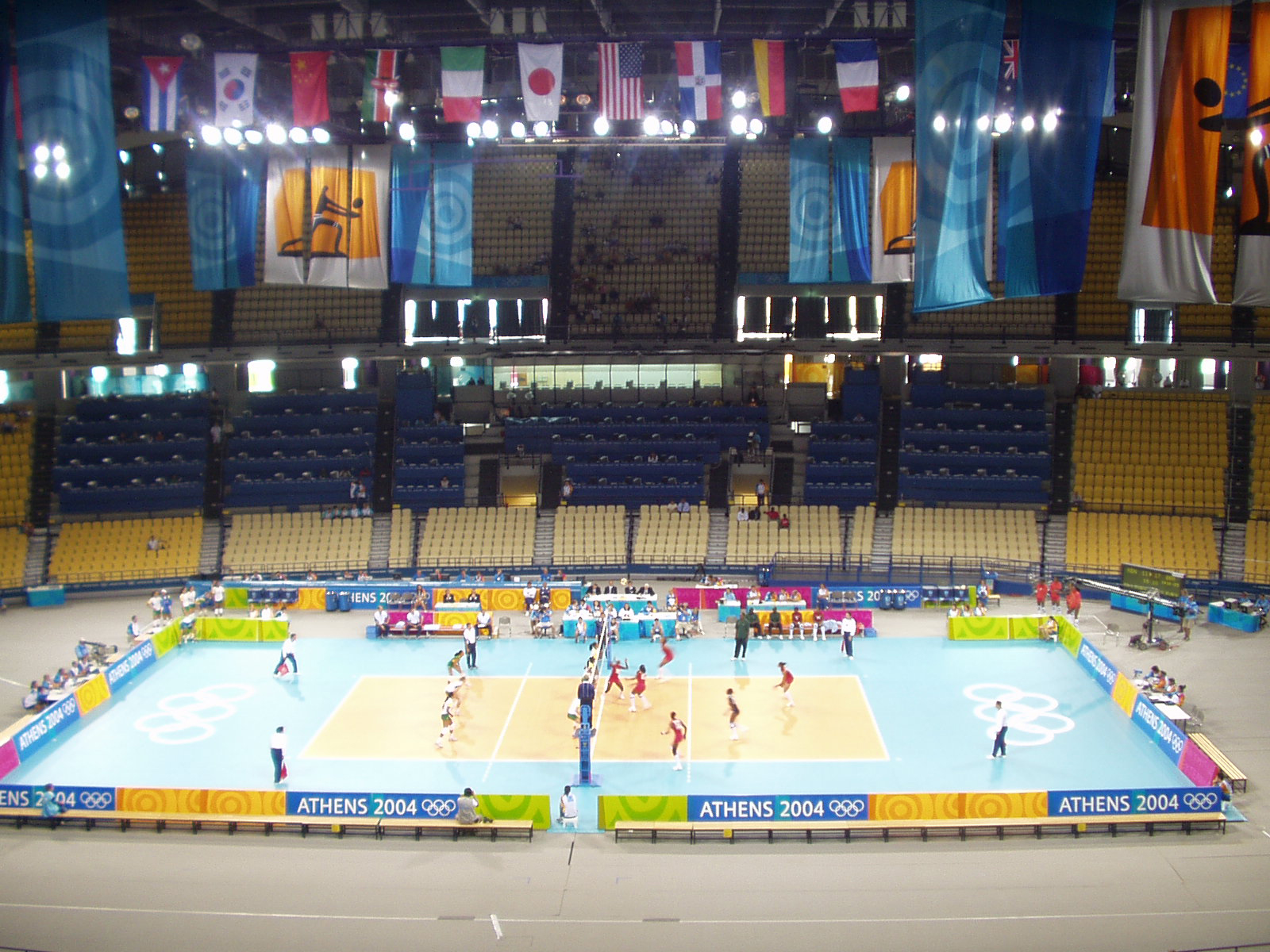
Indoor Volleyball at Peace and Friendship Stadium.

Volleyball at the 2004 Summer Olympics consisted of indoor volleyball held at the Peace and Friendship Stadium and beach volleyball held at the Faliro Olympic Beach Volleyball Centre, in the southern portion of the Roth Pavilion; both were located at the Faliro Coastal Zone Olympic Complex.

== Medal table ==
Rank	Nation	Gold	Silver	Bronze	Total
1	Brazil	2	1	0	3
2	United States	1	0	1	2
3	China	1	0	0	1
4	Russia	0	1	1	2
5	Italy	0	1	0	1
5	Spain	0	1	0	1
7	Cuba	0	0	1	1
7	Switzerland	0	0	1	1
Totals (8 entries)		4	4	4	12

== Medal summary ==
Event	Gold	Silver	Bronze
Men's indoor	Brazil; Giovane Gávio; André Heller; Maurício Lima; Gilberto Godoy Filho; André Nascimento; Sérgio Santos (L); Anderson Rodrigues; Nalbert Bitencourt (c); Gustavo Endres; Rodrigo Santana; Ricardo Garcia; Dante Amaral	Italy; Luigi Mastrangelo; Valerio Vermiglio; Samuele Papi; Andrea Sartoretti; Alberto Cisolla; Ventzislav Simeonov; Damiano Pippi (L); Andrea Giani (c); Alessandro Fei; Paolo Tofoli; Paolo Cozzi; Matej Černič	Russia; Stanislav Dineykin; Sergei Baranov; Pavel Abramov; Aleksey Kazakov; Sergey Tetyukhin; Vadim Khamuttskikh (c); Aleksandr Kosarev; Konstantin Ushakov; Taras Khtey; Andrey Egorchev; Aleksey Verbov (L); Aleksey Kuleshov
Women's indoor	China; Chen Jing; Feng Kun (c); Li Shan; Liu Yanan; Song Nina; Wang Lina; Yang Hao; Zhang Na (L); Zhang Ping; Zhang Yuehong; Zhao Ruirui; Zhou Suhong	Russia; Yevgeniya Artamonova (c); Lioubov Kılıç; Olga Chukanova; Yekaterina Gamova; Aleksandra Korukovets; Olga Nikolaeva; Yelena Plotnikova; Natalya Safronova; Marina Sheshenina; Irina Tebenikhina; Elizaveta Tishchenko; Elena Tyurina (L)	Cuba; Zoila Barros; Rosir Calderón; Nancy Carrillo; Ana Fernández; Maybelis Martínez (L); Liana Mesa; Anniara Muñoz; Yaima Ortíz; Daimí Ramírez; Yumilka Ruíz (c); Marta Sánchez; Dulce Téllez
Men's beach	Ricardo Santos and Emanuel Rego; Brazil	Javier Bosma and Pablo Herrera; Spain	Stefan Kobel and Patrick Heuscher; Switzerland
Women's beach	Kerri Walsh and Misty May; United States	Shelda Bede and Adriana Behar; Brazil	Holly McPeak and Elaine Youngs; United States
