= Moralis (surname) =

Moralis is a Greek surname. Notable people with this surname include:

- Yannis Moralis (born 1968), Greek mayor and Vice President of Olympiacos F.C.
- Yiannis Moralis (1916–2009), Greek visual artist
