= Diamanto Koumbaki =

Greek partisan (1926–1944)

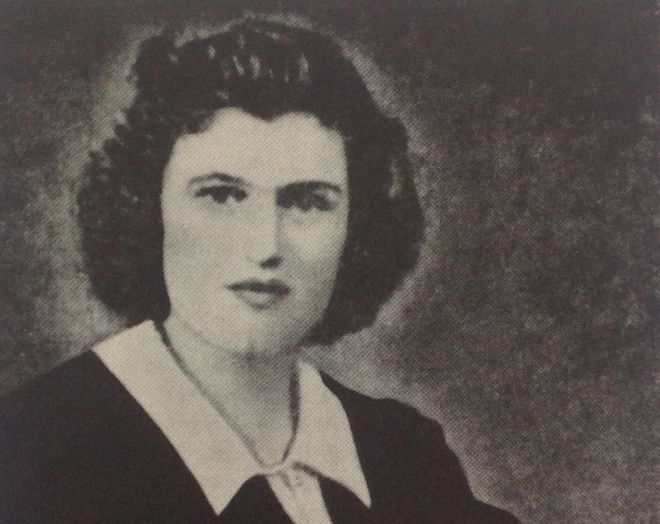
- Born: 8 February 1926; Piraeus, Greece
- Died: 17 August 1944 (aged 18); Nikaia, Attica, Greece
- Cause of death: Execution by firing squad
- Occupation: Partisan

Diamanto Koumbaki (Greek: Διαμάντω Κουμπάκη; 8 February 1926 –17 August 1944) was a Greek partisan. A strong supporter of Communism, Koubmbaki fought against the Axis powers during World War II. She was arrested, tortured, and executed by the German army in Nikaia, Attica in 1944. Following the war, a square in Nikaia was renamed in her honor.
