= Evangelistria Church, Piraeus =

Evangelistria Church
- Ιερός Ναός Ευαγγελίστριας
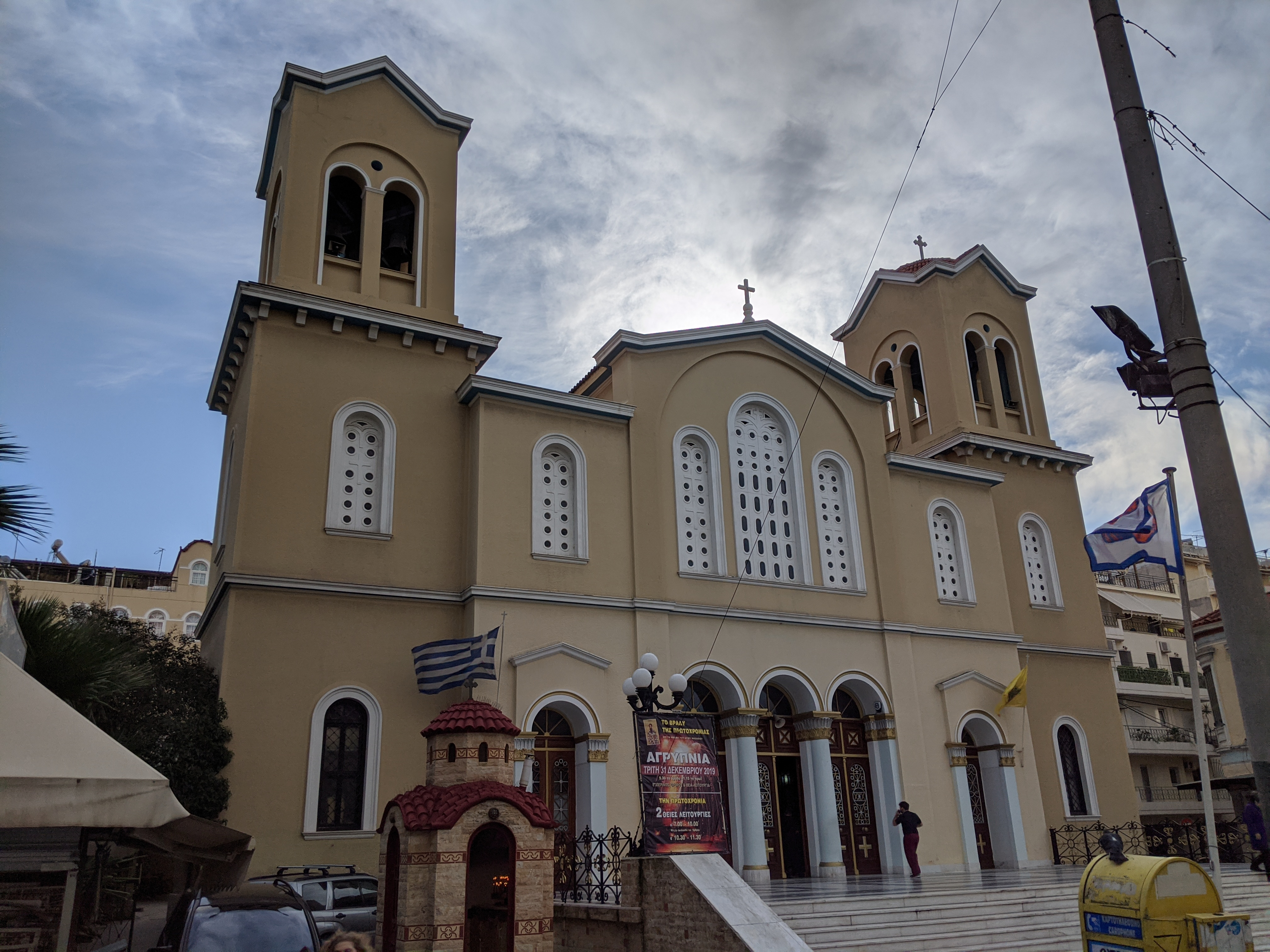

- 37°56′40″N 23°39′13″E
- Location: Evangelistria, Piraeus
- Country: Greece
- Language: Greek
- Denomination: Greek Orthodox

History
- Status: Open

Architecture
- Completed: 1893

Administration
- Metropolis: Metropolis of Piraeus

The Holy Church of Evangelistria (Greek: Ιερός Ναός Ευαγγελίστριας Πειραιώς) is located in the homonymous district of Piraeus. The church of Evangelistria began to be built in 1893 according to the plans of the municipal architect Georgios Zizilas. Emmanouil Papakonstantinou, who succeeded him, supervised and undertook the construction plans. In 1898, the construction of the church was completed. At the same time, materials from the unfinished temple of the Tzaneio Hospital were also being used.

It is a three-aisled basilica with two lateral projections, so as to create a kind of cruciform arrangement. The walls are covered with paintings. Originally it had no dome and spire. In 1897, a spire was added to the axis of the west face and the lateral stairs of the south face. Between 1899 and 1901, the enlarged narthex was built and the ground-floor annexes (the confessional and the novice's residence) were rebuilt. Its morphology is neoclassical: flat corner stones, Corinthian capitals, pseudo-isodomic masonry of the lower level of the facade.

== Sources ==
- Σταματίνα Μαλικούτη, Πειραιάς 1834–1912, εκδ. Πολιτιστικό Ίδρυμα Ομίλου Πειραιώς, 2004, σελ.248-249
