= Piraeus =

Harbour of Athens and a port city in Attica, Greece

Piraeus Πειραιάς (Greek)
- Municipality
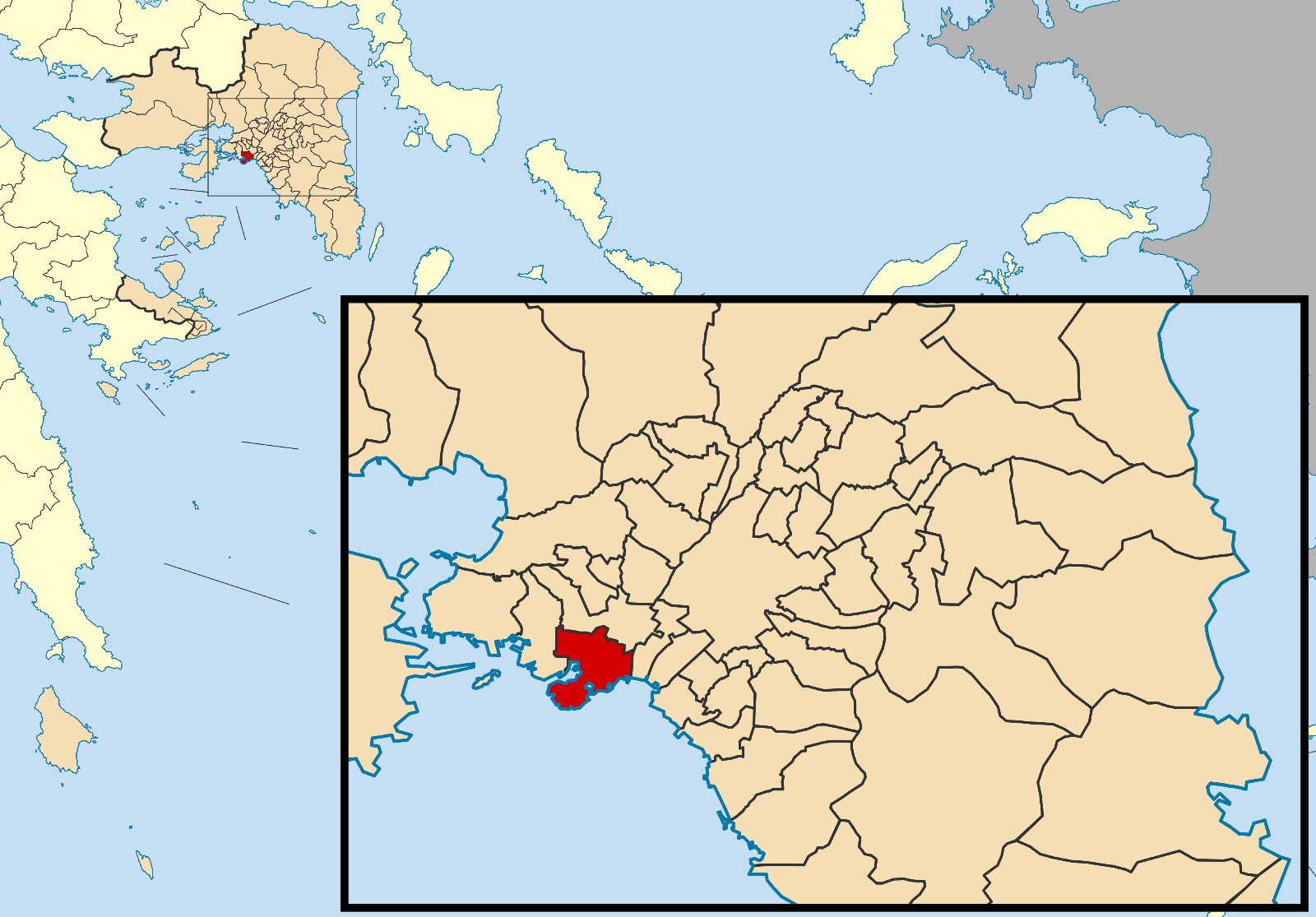

- Location within Greece
- Coordinates: 37°56′34.8″N 23°38′49″E
- Country: Greece
- Administrative region: Attica
- Regional unit: Piraeus

Government
  - Mayor: Yannis Moralis (since 2014)

Area
  - Municipality: 10.865 km^{2} (4.195 sq mi)
  - Urban: 50.417 km^{2} (19.466 sq mi)
- Highest elevation: 87 m (285 ft)
- Lowest elevation: 0 m (0 ft)

Population (2021)
  - Municipality: 168,151
  - Density: 15,476/km^{2} (40,084/sq mi)
  - Urban: 448,051
  - Urban density: 8,886.9/km^{2} (23,017/sq mi)
- Time zone: UTC+2 (EET)
  - Summer (DST): UTC+3 (EEST)
- Postal code: 185 xx
- Area code: 21
- Vehicle registration: (CARS) ΥI, YK, YM, YN (MOTORCYCLES) BE, BH, BZ
- Website: www.piraeus.gov.gr

Piraeus (/paɪˈriːəs, pɪˈreɪəs/ py-REE-əs, pirr-AY-əs; Greek: Πειραιάς Peiraiás [pireˈas]; Ancient Greek and Katharevousa: Πειραιεύς Peiraieús, Ancient: [peːrai̯eús], Katharevousa: [pireˈefs]) is a port city within the Athens urban area ("Greater Athens"), in the Attica region of Greece. It is located eight kilometres (5 mi) southwest of Athens city centre along the east coast of the Saronic Gulf in the Athens Riviera.

The municipality of Piraeus and four other suburban municipalities form the regional unit of Piraeus, sometimes called the Greater Piraeus area, with a total population of 448,051. At the 2021 census, Piraeus had a population of 168,151 people, making it the fourth largest municipality in Greece and the second largest (after the municipality of Athens) within the Athens urban area.

Piraeus has a long recorded history, dating back to ancient Greece. The city was founded in the early 5th century BC, when plans to make it the new port of Athens were implemented: A prototype harbour was constructed, which resulted in concentrating in one location all the import and transit trade of Athens, along with the navy's base. During the Golden Age of Athens, the Long Walls were constructed to fortify the route from the main settlement to the port (Piraeus). During the classical period, the naval base in Piraeus had 372 trireme shipsheds. Beginning in the 3rd century B.C., Piraeus went into a period of cumulative decline. However, it began growing once again in the 19th century, after Athens was made the capital of Greece. Today Piraeus is a large city bustling with activity. It is a huge marine and commercial-industrial centre, and home to Greece's largest harbour.

The port of Piraeus is the chief port in Greece, the 5th largest passenger port in Europe and the 24th largest passenger port in the world serving about 4.37 million passengers annually in 2020. With a throughput of 5.44 million TEUs, Piraeus is among the busiest ten ports in Europe in terms of container traffic, and is the busiest container port in the Eastern Mediterranean. The city hosted events in both the 1896 and 2004 Summer Olympics held in Athens. The University of Piraeus is one of the largest universities in Greece, and includes the country's second-oldest business school, as well as the oldest academic department dedicated to the study of finance.

== History ==
=== Ancient and medieval times ===
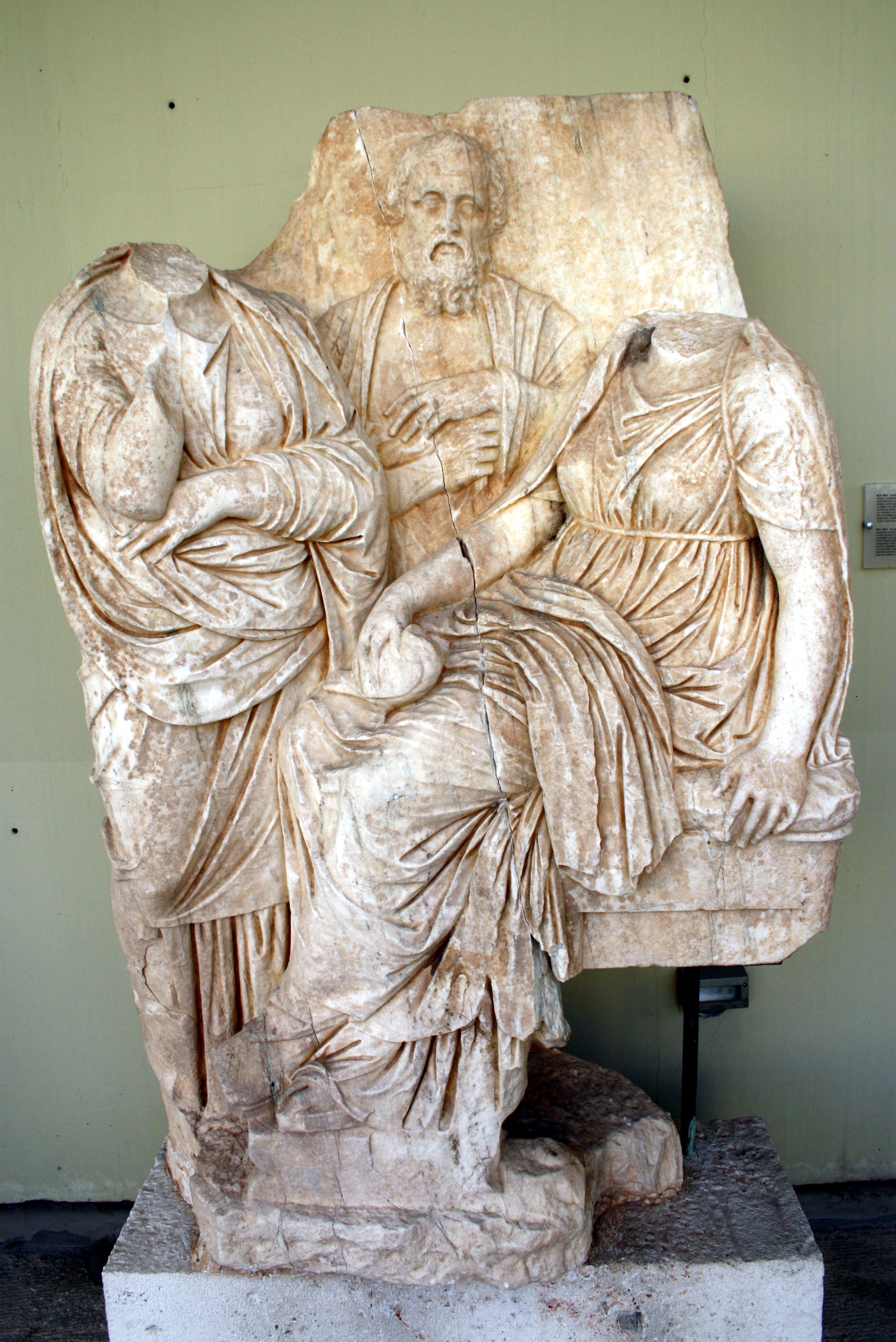
Funerary relief for a girl, flanked by her parents (330/320 BC); Archaeological Museum of Piraeus.

Piraeus has been inhabited since at least the 26th century BC. Piraeus is a rocky outcropping on the Greek coast that features the steep hill of Munichia and modern-day Kastella. Although long connected to the mainland by a land bridge that is consistently above water, Piraeus in prehistoric times was an island connected to the mainland only by a low-lying stretch of land that was flooded by sea water most of the year. Whenever the land bridge dried up, it was used as a salt field (its ancient name, the Halipedon, means the 'salt field'), and its muddy soil made for a tricky passage. Over time, however, the area became increasingly silted, high, and dry—and flooding ceased—so that, by early classical times, the land passage could be safely crossed at all times. Thus in ancient Greece, Piraeus assumed increased importance because of its three deep-water harbours: the main port of Cantharus and the two smaller ports, Zea and Munichia. The Piraeus harbours gradually replaced the older and shallower Phaleron harbour, which fell into disuse.

In the late 6th and early 5th centuries BC, the area became the focus of strategic and political improvements due to its natural advantages. For example, in 511 BC, the hill of Munichia was fortified by Hippias, and four years later Piraeus was made a deme of Athens by Cleisthenes. According to the ancient Greek historian Thucydides, in 493 BC, Themistocles initiated fortification works in Piraeus, and later advised the Athenians to take advantage of its natural harbours' strategic potential instead of using the sandy bay of Phaleron. A duty of 2 percent was levied on goods passing through the port. These were very effective at raising funds for the city of Athens. In the year 399 after the Peloponnesian War, for example, the city had collected 1,800 talents in harbour dues despite economic effects of the war.

In 483 BC, a new silver vein was discovered in the Laurion mines, and the profit from mining that silver was utilized to fund the construction of 200 triremes; the Athenian fleet was transferred to Piraeus, and the triremes were built in its shipyards. The Athenian fleet played a crucial role in the battle of Salamis against the Persians in 480 BC. From then on, Piraeus was permanently used as the navy's base. After the second Persian invasion of Greece, Themistocles fortified the three harbours of Piraeus and created the neosoikoi (ship houses); the Themistoclean Walls were completed in 471 BC, transforming Piraeus into a great military and commercial harbour. The city's fortifications were later further improved by the construction of the Long Walls under Cimon and Pericles, which secured the route from Piraeus and its ports to the main city of Athens. Meanwhile, Piraeus was rebuilt, based on the famous grid plan of architect Hippodamus of Miletus, known as the Hippodamian plan. (The main agora of the city was named after him in honour of this achievement.) As a result, Piraeus flourished, becoming a highly secure port with booming commercial activity, and a city bustling with life.

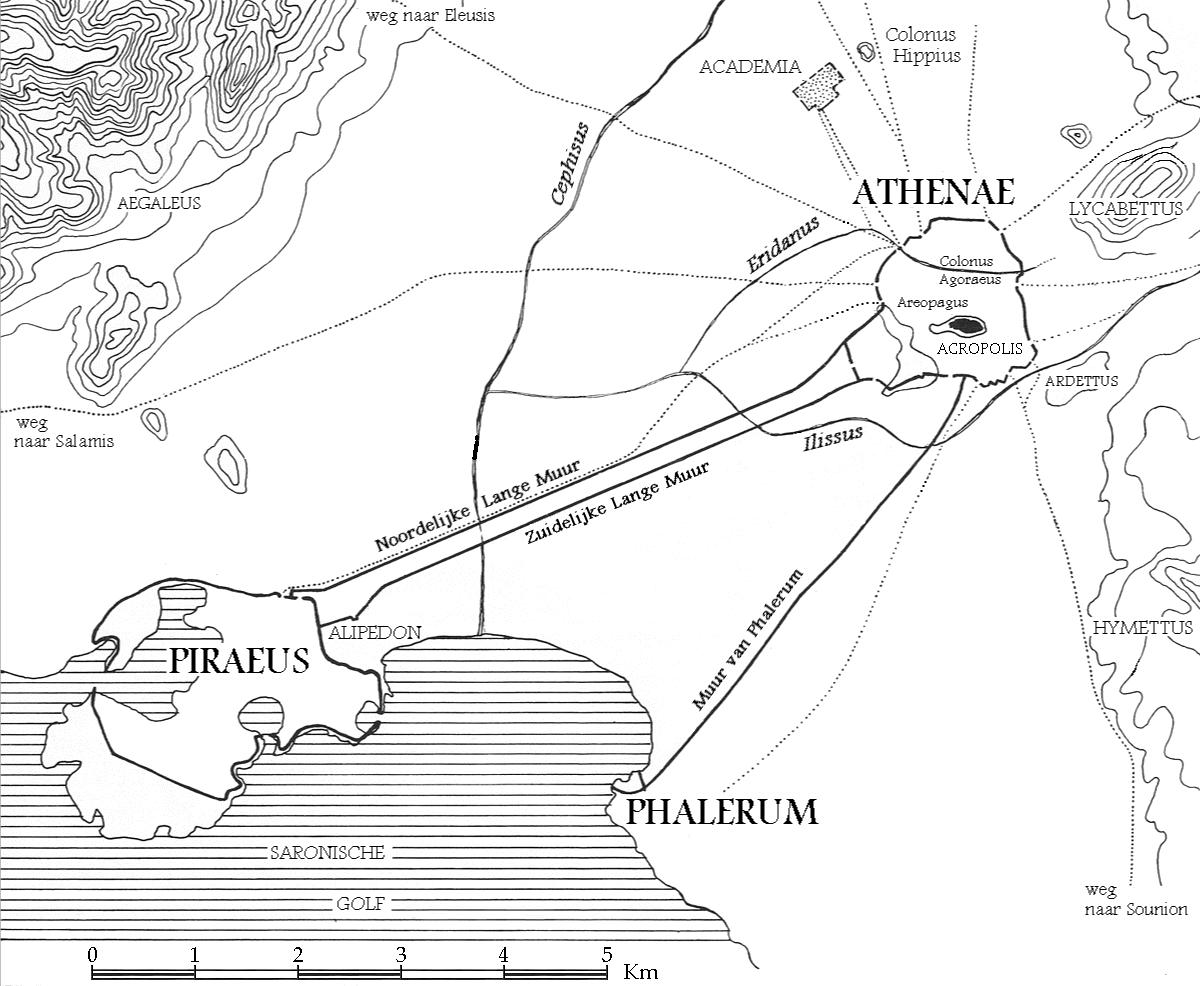
The Long Walls connecting the ancient city of Athens to its port of Piraeus.

In the second year of the Peloponnesian War, Piraeus suffered its first setback when the Athens plague spread to it. In 429, the Spartans ravaged Salamis as part of an abortive attack on the Piraeus. But when the Athenians responded by sending a fleet to investigate, the Spartan alliance forces fled. In 404 BC, the Spartan fleet under Lysander blockaded Piraeus, and subsequently Athens surrendered to the Spartans, putting an end to the Delian League and the war itself. Piraeus was to suffer the same fate as Athens and bear the brunt of the Spartans' rage, as the city's walls and the Long Walls were torn down; the Athenian fleet surrendered to the victors, some of the triremes were burnt, and the neosoikoi were pulled down. As a result, the tattered and unfortified port city was not able to compete with prosperous Rhodes, which became the dominant commercial force in the region. In 403 BC, Munichia was seized by Thrasybulus and the exiles from Phyle, in the battle of Munichia, where the Phyleans defeated the Thirty Tyrants of Athens, but in the following battle of Piraeus the exiles were defeated by Spartan forces.

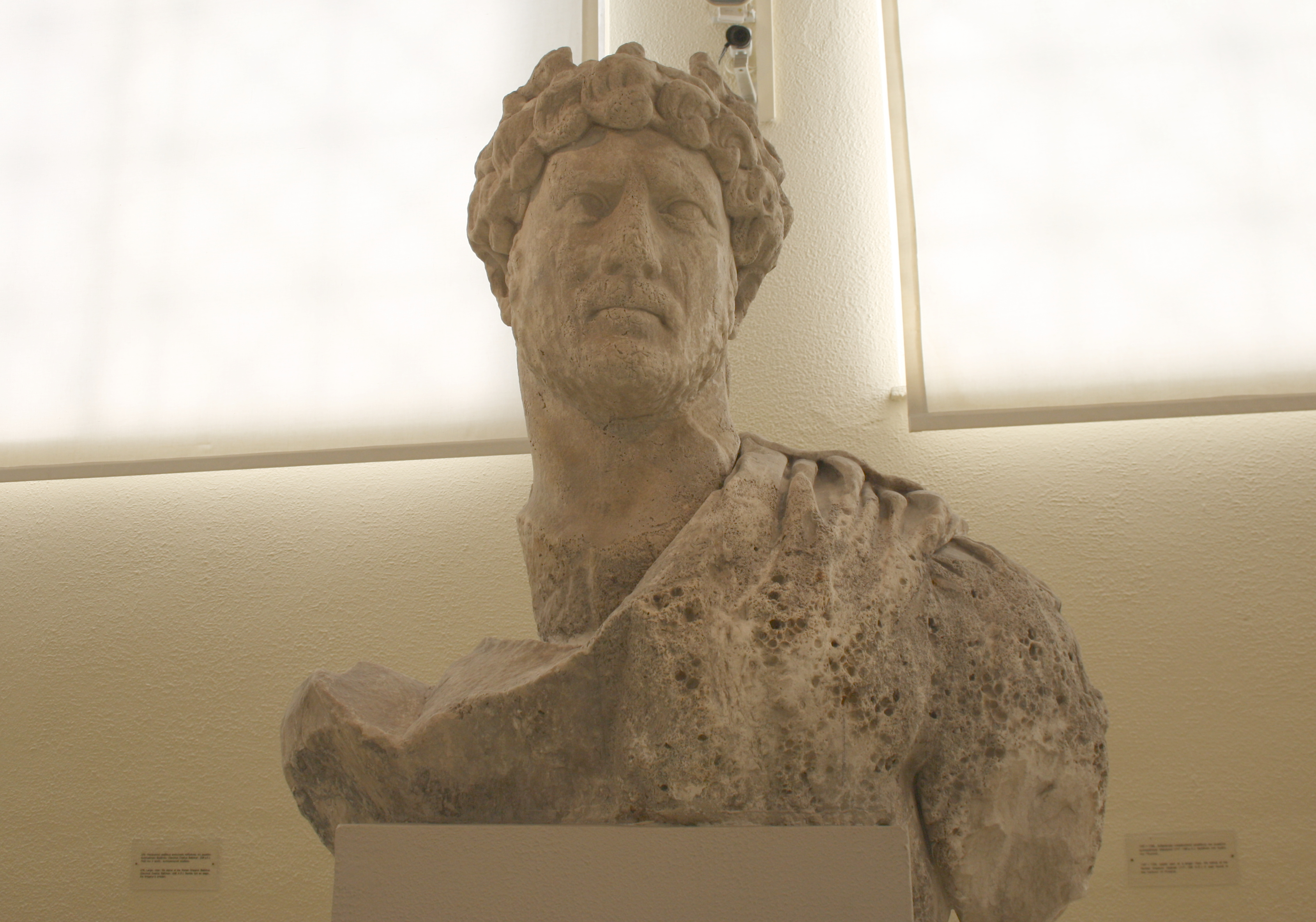
Colossal statue of Hadrian of Piraeus.

After the reinstatement of democracy, General Conon rebuilt the walls in 393 BC, founded the temple of Aphrodite Euploia and the sanctuary of Zeus Sotiros and Athena, and built the famous Skeuotheke (arsenal) of Philon, the ruins of which have been discovered at Zea harbour. The reconstruction of Piraeus went on during the period of Alexander the Great, but this revival of the town was quashed by Roman Lucius Cornelius Sulla, who captured and totally destroyed Piraeus in 86 BC. The destruction was completed in 395 AD by the Goths under Alaric I. Piraeus was led to a long period of decline which lasted for fifteen centuries. During the Byzantine period the harbour of Piraeus was occasionally used for the Byzantine fleet, but it was very far from the capital city of Constantinople.

In the Middle Ages, the port was usually called by the Venetians the "port of Sithines" (that is, of Athens) and in the 14th century, the name "Lion" is first attested, after the colossal ancient sculpture of a lion, the Piraeus Lion, which stood at the harbour's entrance. This later become Porto Leone (Πόρτο Λεόνε). It was also called Porto Drako (Πόρτο Δράκο) by Greeks, drako meaning not just "dragon", but any monster.

=== Ottoman period ===
When Piraeus was taken by the Ottoman Empire in 1456, it became known as Aslan Liman ("Lion Harbour"), a translation of the existing Venetian name.

The Piraeus Lion itself was looted in 1687 by Francesco Morosini during his expedition against Athens (part of the Morean War) and was carried to the Venetian Arsenal, where it still stands today. A copy of the lion statue is on display at the Archaeological Museum of Piraeus.

Under Ottoman rule, especially before the beginning of the Greek War of Independence, Piraeus was mostly deserted, except for the monastery of Saint Spyridon (1590) and a customs house, and it was only used occasionally as a commercial port. Although there were numerous land owners, Athenians did not live in the area.

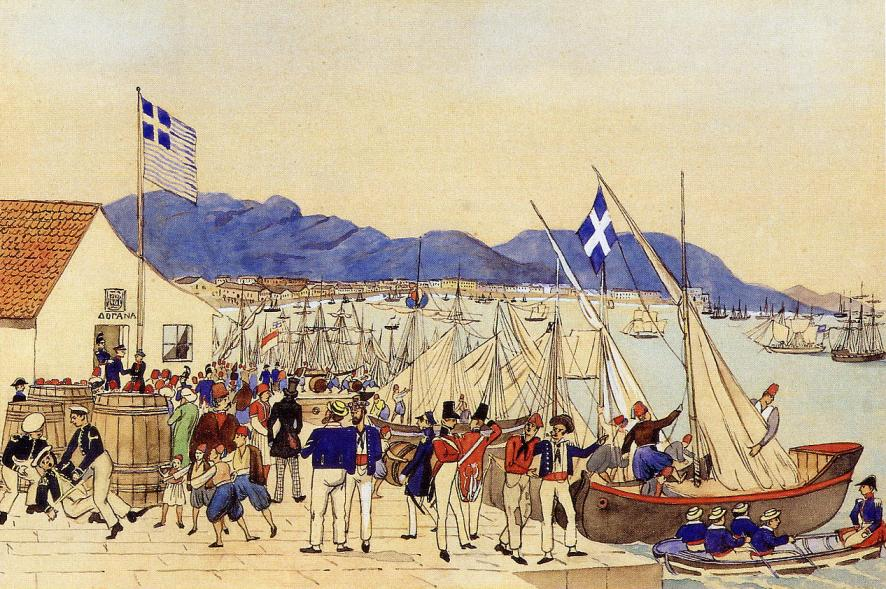
The customs office of the port of Piraeus in 1837. Watercolor by the Bavarian captain Ludwig Köllnberger.

There were at least two failed attempts to create a new town, the first in 1792 by bringing a population from Hydra and the second during the Greek War of Independence in 1825 by the installation of people from Psara, but it was not until 1829 that permanent habitation of the area was restarted. Piraeus at first developed into a small town with few dwellings, far from its glorious past as a prosperous city, with its population consisting largely of fishermen.

=== Modern era ===
The city of Piraeus and the church of Saint Spyridon; postcard of 1887.

With the creation of the modern Greek state and the proclamation of Athens as its capital in 1832, the port, still named Πόρτο Λεόνε "Porto Leone" or Πόρτο Δράκο "Porto Draco", again acquired a reason for growth, and began to develop into a commercial and industrial centre. Migrants, mainly from the Aegean Islands, continued to arrive. A town plan was also drawn up and approved by King Otto, but not completely fulfilled, as it was revolutionary for its time.

The municipality was established in 1835, reviving the ancient name "Piraeus". Following petitions from the new and emerging prosperous bourgeoisie, municipal elections were held to elect a mayor for the city, Kyriakos Serfiotis of Hydra. Piraeus had around 300 inhabitants at this time.

Piraeus, from a deserted small town, quickly became the leading port and the second largest city in Greece, with its prime geographical location and closeness to the Greek capital helping it continually to grow, attracting people from across the country. A number of events contributed to the development of the city; among these were its ultimate declaration as the leading port of Greece, the completion of the Athens-Piraeus Railway in 1869, the industrial development of the area in the 1860s, and the creation of the Corinth Canal in 1893, all of which left Piraeus more strategically important than ever. New buildings were constructed to cover the necessities of this growth, such as educational institutions, churches, the Stock Exchange Building, the Town Hall, the Central Market, the Post Office Building and charity institutions; the port was also supplemented and modernised, with dredging operations, the construction of the Royal Landing, the Troumba Pier and the quay-ways up to the Customs House area, the commencement of construction work on the Outer Moles and the completion of permanent dry-docks. At the end of the 19th century, Piraeus had a population of 51,020 people.

The establishment of the Port Committee in 1911, which controlled the works of construction and maintenance of the port, and the Piraeus Port Authority in 1930, which made a more efficient job of managing a port slowly increasing in traffic, played a catalytic role in the city's development. The town flourished and neo-classical buildings were erected; one of them, which continues to ornament the present town, is the Piraeus Municipal Theatre, an excellent example of the area's once wider neoclassical architecture. After the decisive period for Greece of 1912–1922, Piraeus experienced a major demographic explosion, with its population almost doubling to reach 251,659 in 1928 from 133,482 in 1920, an increase owed to the arrival of Greek refugees from Asia Minor after the 1919–1922 Greco-Turkish War and the Greek genocide in Anatolia and finally the subsequent population exchange between Greece and Turkey. Although there was an increase in the labour force, a variety of social problems also emerged with the concentration of new populations in the suburbs of the city, such as Nikaia, Keratsini, Perama, Drapetsona and Korydallos.

The involvement of Greece in World War II came as a major setback to the city's progress. After the war, the city began its development once more, as damage to the port and the city were repaired and new additions took shape after 1955. Piraeus is now the fifth largest municipality in Greece; the city proper with its suburbs form the Piraeus urban area, which is incorporated in the Athens urban area, thus making Piraeus an integral part of the Greek capital. The port of Piraeus is now an important international port, and the largest in the country.

== Geography ==
Piraeus is situated in the southwest part of the central plain of Attica, also widely known as the Attica Basin, which the Athens urban area (or agglomeration) sprawls across. Piraeus is bounded by the Mount Aigaleo to the northwest, and the Saronic Gulf to the south and west, and connected with the rest of the Athens urban area to the east and northeast. The "city proper" of Piraeus consists of a rocky peninsula, originally an island, featuring three natural harbours. In addition to the central one, called Kantharos in ancient times, the smaller harbours to the east are still in use: Zea, also known as Pasalimani, and Munichia, the smallest of the three and widely known as Mikrolimano and Tourkolimano . Nowadays, the Greater Piraeus includes the harbours of Drapetsona, Keratsini and Perama. The central harbour is a hub of commercial and passenger shipping, whereas the two smaller ones cater to recreational and fishing craft. The municipality has an area of 10.865 km^{2}.

=== Climate ===
Under Köppen climate classification Piraeus has a hot semi-arid climate (BSh) and according to the Hellenic National Meteorological Service climate atlas it is the only area in Attica, Greece that clearly falls into this climate category. Due to summer night land breezes in Athens, Piraeus records high minimum summer temperatures while the mean annual temperature stands at 19.4 °C (66.9 °F). During July 2024 minimum temperatures remained over 30 °C (86 °F) for 12 consecutive days in Piraeus, breaking all known records for any area in the country.

Climate data for Piraeus Hellenic National Meteorological Service (1981-2010)
Month	Jan	Feb	Mar	Apr	May	Jun	Jul	Aug	Sep	Oct	Nov	Dec	Year
Mean daily maximum °C (°F)	14.1 (57.4)	14.4 (57.9)	16.6 (61.9)	20.3 (68.5)	25.1 (77.2)	29.9 (85.8)	32.8 (91.0)	32.9 (91.2)	29.1 (84.4)	24.2 (75.6)	18.9 (66.0)	15.4 (59.7)	22.81 (73.06)
Daily mean °C (°F)	11.1 (52.0)	11.2 (52.2)	13.3 (55.9)	16.9 (62.4)	21.4 (70.5)	26.3 (79.3)	29.0 (84.2)	28.8 (83.8)	25.2 (77.4)	20.6 (69.1)	15.8 (60.4)	12.6 (54.7)	19.35 (66.83)
Mean daily minimum °C (°F)	8.2 (46.8)	7.9 (46.2)	10.0 (50.0)	13.4 (56.1)	17.7 (63.9)	22.2 (72.0)	24.8 (76.6)	25.0 (77.0)	21.5 (70.7)	17.4 (63.3)	12.9 (55.2)	9.7 (49.5)	15.89 (60.60)
Average rainfall mm (inches)	41.95 (1.65)	36.26 (1.43)	34.09 (1.34)	30.34 (1.19)	15.95 (0.63)	5.08 (0.20)	5.56 (0.22)	3.07 (0.12)	11.37 (0.45)	30.5 (1.20)	58.87 (2.32)	58.84 (2.32)	331.9 (13.07)
Source: National Technical University of Athens

Climate data for Piraeus Kallipoli (29 m a.s.l.) Climate: Hot semi-arid climate (BSh) • USDA: 10b (2.06°C)
Month	Jan	Feb	Mar	Apr	May	Jun	Jul	Aug	Sep	Oct	Nov	Dec	Year
Record high °C (°F)	21.3 (70.3)	21.4 (70.5)	25.6 (78.1)	30.6 (87.1)	34.2 (93.6)	39.5 (103.1)	41.5 (106.7)	39.8 (103.6)	36.3 (97.3)	30.7 (87.3)	26.8 (80.2)	21.7 (71.1)	41.5 (106.7)
Mean daily maximum °C (°F)	14.4 (57.9)	15.1 (59.2)	17.3 (63.1)	20.9 (69.6)	25.2 (77.4)	31.1 (88.0)	34.2 (93.6)	33.8 (92.8)	29.3 (84.7)	24.3 (75.7)	20.1 (68.2)	16.2 (61.2)	23.5 (74.3)
Daily mean °C (°F)	11.6 (52.9)	12.2 (54.0)	14.0 (57.2)	17.4 (63.3)	21.6 (70.9)	27.2 (81.0)	30.3 (86.5)	30.1 (86.2)	25.9 (78.6)	21.1 (70.0)	17.2 (63.0)	13.5 (56.3)	20.2 (68.3)
Mean daily minimum °C (°F)	8.7 (47.7)	9.2 (48.6)	10.8 (51.4)	14.0 (57.2)	18.1 (64.6)	23.3 (73.9)	26.4 (79.5)	26.4 (79.5)	22.5 (72.5)	17.9 (64.2)	14.3 (57.7)	10.8 (51.4)	16.9 (62.4)
Record low °C (°F)	−0.1 (31.8)	−0.6 (30.9)	1.6 (34.9)	7.2 (45.0)	9.2 (48.6)	16.1 (61.0)	19.3 (66.7)	20.5 (68.9)	15.2 (59.4)	11.6 (52.9)	6.9 (44.4)	2.3 (36.1)	−0.6 (30.9)
Average rainfall mm (inches)	54.0 (2.13)	37.4 (1.47)	20.2 (0.80)	21.1 (0.83)	11.2 (0.44)	13.1 (0.52)	5.3 (0.21)	6.7 (0.26)	22.8 (0.90)	23.4 (0.92)	59.7 (2.35)	62.4 (2.46)	337.3 (13.29)
Source 1: National Observatory of Athens Monthly Bulletins (Sep 2017 – Aug 2026)
Source 2: Piraeus Kallipoli N.O.A station, World Meteorological Organization

Climate data for Piraeus Port (20 m a.s.l.) Climate: Hot semi-arid climate (BSh) • USDA: 10b (3.2°C)
Month	Jan	Feb	Mar	Apr	May	Jun	Jul	Aug	Sep	Oct	Nov	Dec	Year
Record high °C (°F)	19.6 (67.3)	19.8 (67.6)	24.6 (76.3)	28.6 (83.5)	30.8 (87.4)	39.3 (102.7)	41.8 (107.2)	38.8 (101.8)	36.2 (97.2)	30.2 (86.4)	26.7 (80.1)	21.6 (70.9)	41.8 (107.2)
Mean daily maximum °C (°F)	15.4 (59.7)	15.1 (59.2)	18.0 (64.4)	21.2 (70.2)	24.9 (76.8)	32.2 (90.0)	35.0 (95.0)	33.8 (92.8)	29.5 (85.1)	24.6 (76.3)	20.8 (69.4)	17.2 (63.0)	24.0 (75.2)
Daily mean °C (°F)	12.9 (55.2)	12.5 (54.5)	14.9 (58.8)	18.0 (64.4)	21.6 (70.9)	28.2 (82.8)	31.1 (88.0)	30.4 (86.7)	26.2 (79.2)	21.7 (71.1)	18.1 (64.6)	14.6 (58.3)	20.8 (69.5)
Mean daily minimum °C (°F)	10.4 (50.7)	10.0 (50.0)	11.9 (53.4)	14.8 (58.6)	18.2 (64.8)	24.3 (75.7)	27.3 (81.1)	26.9 (80.4)	23.0 (73.4)	18.7 (65.7)	15.3 (59.5)	12.0 (53.6)	17.7 (63.9)
Record low °C (°F)	3.8 (38.8)	0.7 (33.3)	6.6 (43.9)	8.4 (47.1)	9.3 (48.7)	18.4 (65.1)	19.4 (66.9)	21.9 (71.4)	15.8 (60.4)	14.8 (58.6)	7.8 (46.0)	6.2 (43.2)	0.7 (33.3)
Average rainfall mm (inches)	59.9 (2.36)	43.7 (1.72)	19.1 (0.75)	16.9 (0.67)	9.7 (0.38)	2.6 (0.10)	3.0 (0.12)	9.8 (0.39)	33.5 (1.32)	12.2 (0.48)	63.1 (2.48)	67.2 (2.65)	340.7 (13.42)
Source 1: National Observatory of Athens Monthly Bulletins (Apr 2022 – Aug 2026)
Source 2: Piraeus Port N.O.A station, World Meteorological Organization

== Demography ==
Piraeus is the fifth most populous municipality in Greece with an official population of 168,151 (in 2021). The Greater Piraeus, part of the greater Athens urban area, comprises the city proper (municipality of Piraeus) and four other suburban municipalities, having a total population of 448,051 people (in 2021).

The table below shows the historical population of Piraeus and Piraeus regional unit in recent times.

Year	Municipality population	Greater area population
1951	186,088	
1961	183,957	
1971	187,458	439,138
1981	196,389	476,304
1991	182,671	456,865
2001	175,697	466,065
2011	163,688	448,997
2021	168,151	448,051

== Culture ==
=== Archaeological sites ===
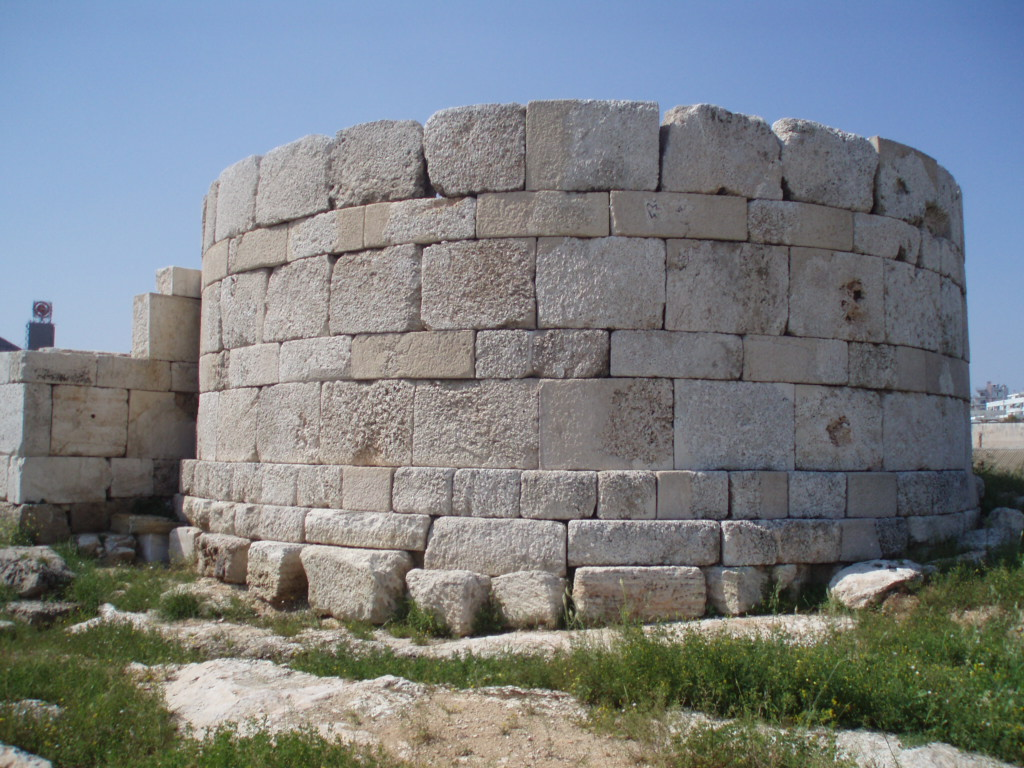
Part of Eetioneia, the ancient gate to the harbour and part of the fortification of Piraeus, built during the Peloponnesian War.

Among the archaeological sites of Piraeus, parts of the ancient Themistoclean Walls and Eëtioneia, a mole in the entrance to the harbour, are still preserved in good condition. Excavations in Pasalimani revealed the Skeuotheke, an ancient structure where ship rigging equipment was stored, designed by architect Philon. In Kastella the Syrangion is to be found, which probably served as a sanctuary to the local hero Syrango, and the Cave of Arethusa, both prehistoric. Ruins of the ancient city at the basement of the cathedral of Agia Triada and the ancient Theater of Zea next to the Archaeological Museum, the ancient neosoikoi in Zea, Munichia and Kantharos navy yard, can also be seen.

==== Bronze statues ====
The discovery of four bronze statues at a construction site near the Tinaneios Gardens in Piraeus, Greece on July 18, 1959 is still remembered by an entire generation as a momentous discovery in Modern Greek archaeology. The statues are now featured in the Piraeus Museum, and are largely responsible for the creation of the modern Archaeological Museum of Piraeus. While drilling in order to lay pipes, the Hydrex Company came across the hand of a bronze kouros (youth) at a depth of approximately 1.50 meters. Excavations began after the custodian of the local museum, Dimitrios Kalantonis, and the Director of the Archaeological Service, Yiannis Papdimitriou, were informed. Four noteworthy bronze statues were uncovered in the continuing excavations – the Archaic Apollo (the kouros whose hand had originally been seen), the large Artemis, a smaller Artemis, and a larger-than-life Athena. However, the enthusiasm for the dig led to poor documentation of the details and context of the finds, leaving rare photos taken by the media or public as the only record. There are multiple theories as to how the statues came to be carefully arranged within what is thought to have been a small square room. When and why the statues were apparently hidden is open to debate, along with their origins, date, and style. One early theory suggests that the statues had been stored near the harbour with the intention of being shipped to Italy; however, the presence of coins near the statues dating from a period of war opens up another possibility – that the statues were hidden for safe keeping, and then lost when the building was destroyed. Dating the concealment of the statues is another issue, as they may have been buried anytime between the 1st century BC and the 3rd century AD. The statue of the kouros was recognized to be of Apollo, and dated to the 5th century BC. The other three female statues, from the 4th century BC, show a different, more human, form of sculpture that sets them apart from their older companion.

=== Leisure and entertainment ===
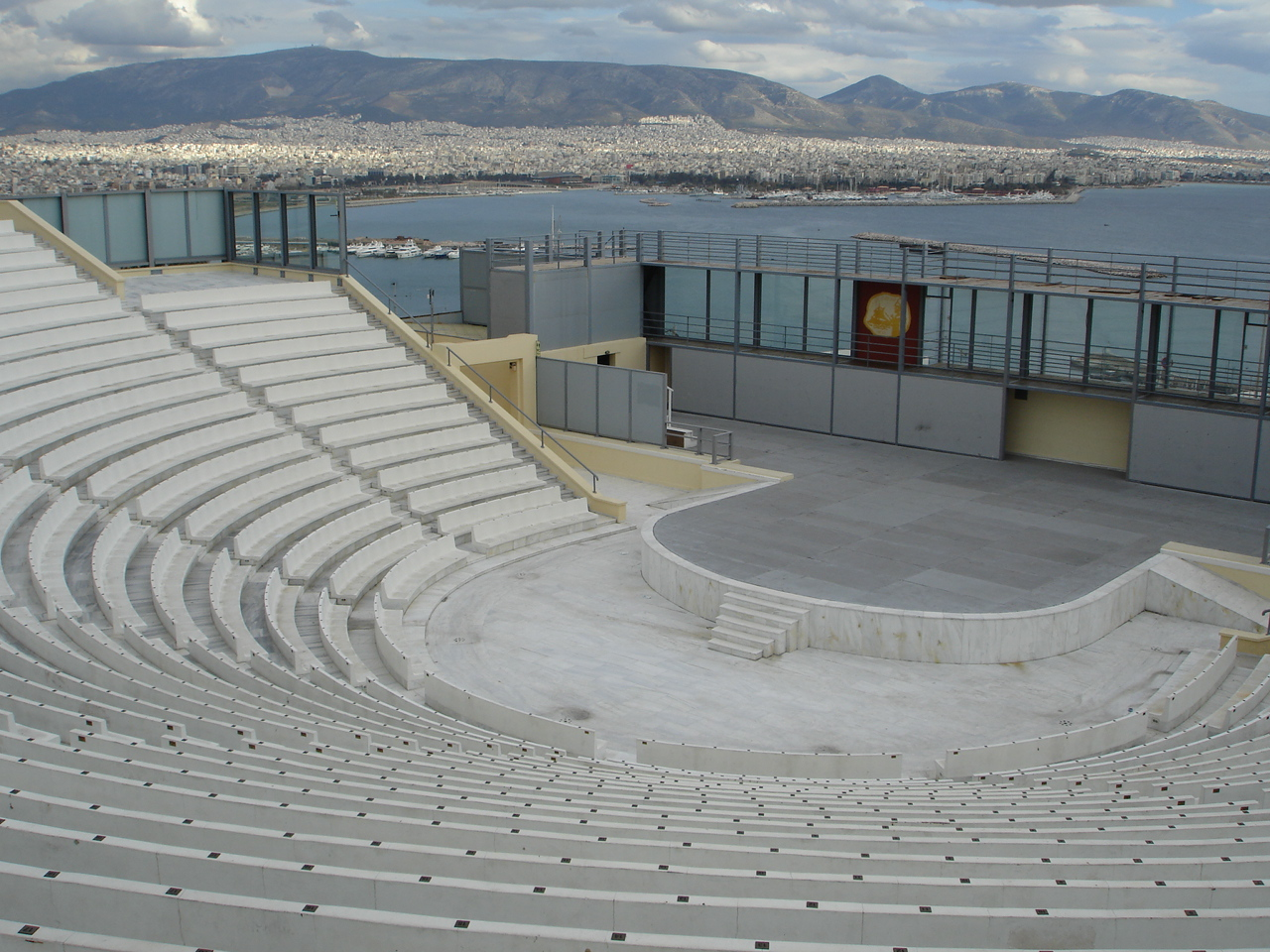
The Veakeio Theater (former Skylitseio) on the hill of Kastella, with view to the Saronic Gulf, Mount Hymettus and the southeastern part of Athens.

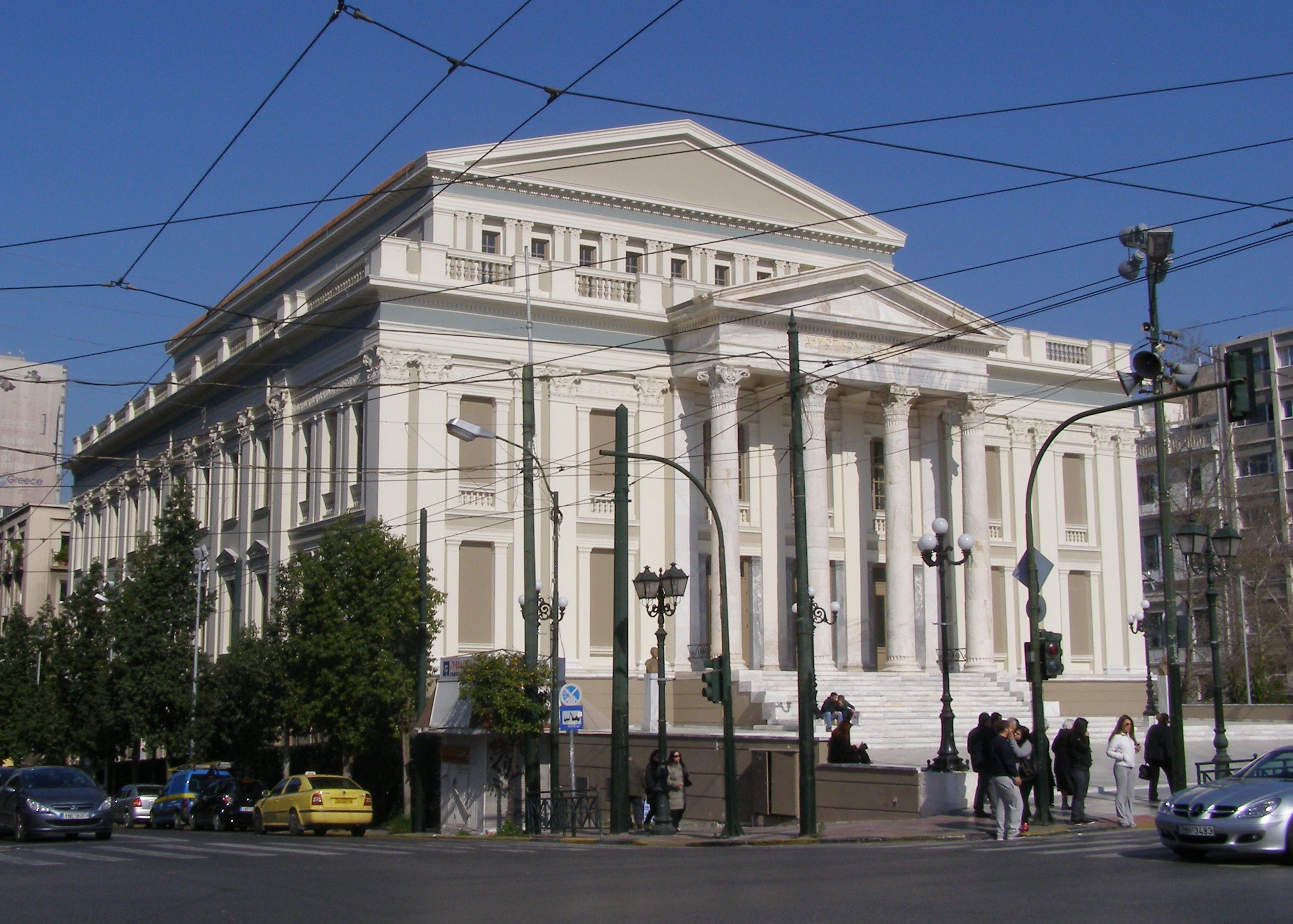
The Piraeus Municipal Theatre

Piraeus provides a wide variety of entertainment. There are a lot of tavernas and restaurants in Piraeus, renowned for their cuisine. Most are spread along the coasts of Mikrolimano and Piraiki, specializing in seafood and attracting many visitors, including tourists. The nightlife of the city is vibrant, with numerous bars and nightclubs. Plenty of major shopping areas can be found on the central avenues of Piraeus, Iroon Polytechneiou and Grigoriou Labraki.

In the summer, the Maritime Festival take place, while the Three Kings' Way Festival marks the beginning of the carnival, with all the associated costumes and entertainment.

The Municipal Theater has been the center of the arts in Piraeus, hosting a variety of cultural events including theater, dance and music events. The open air Veakeio Theater on Kastella is a popular destination during the summer and hosts concerts, folk music bands and Greek and foreign troupes, while the Menandreio Theater, widely known as Delfinario, is popular for hosting variety shows. Village Park, a large multipurpose center and part of the Village Cinemas built in suburban Agios Ioannis Renti, attracts a large number of people from the whole of Athens, offering a diversity of shops, cafes, and restaurant, in addition to the twenty cinemas making it the largest cinema complex in Greece. Next to it, the Allou Fun Park is the most recent and largest amusement theme park in Athens, offering its numerous rides and attractions, restaurants and pastry shops.

=== Museums ===
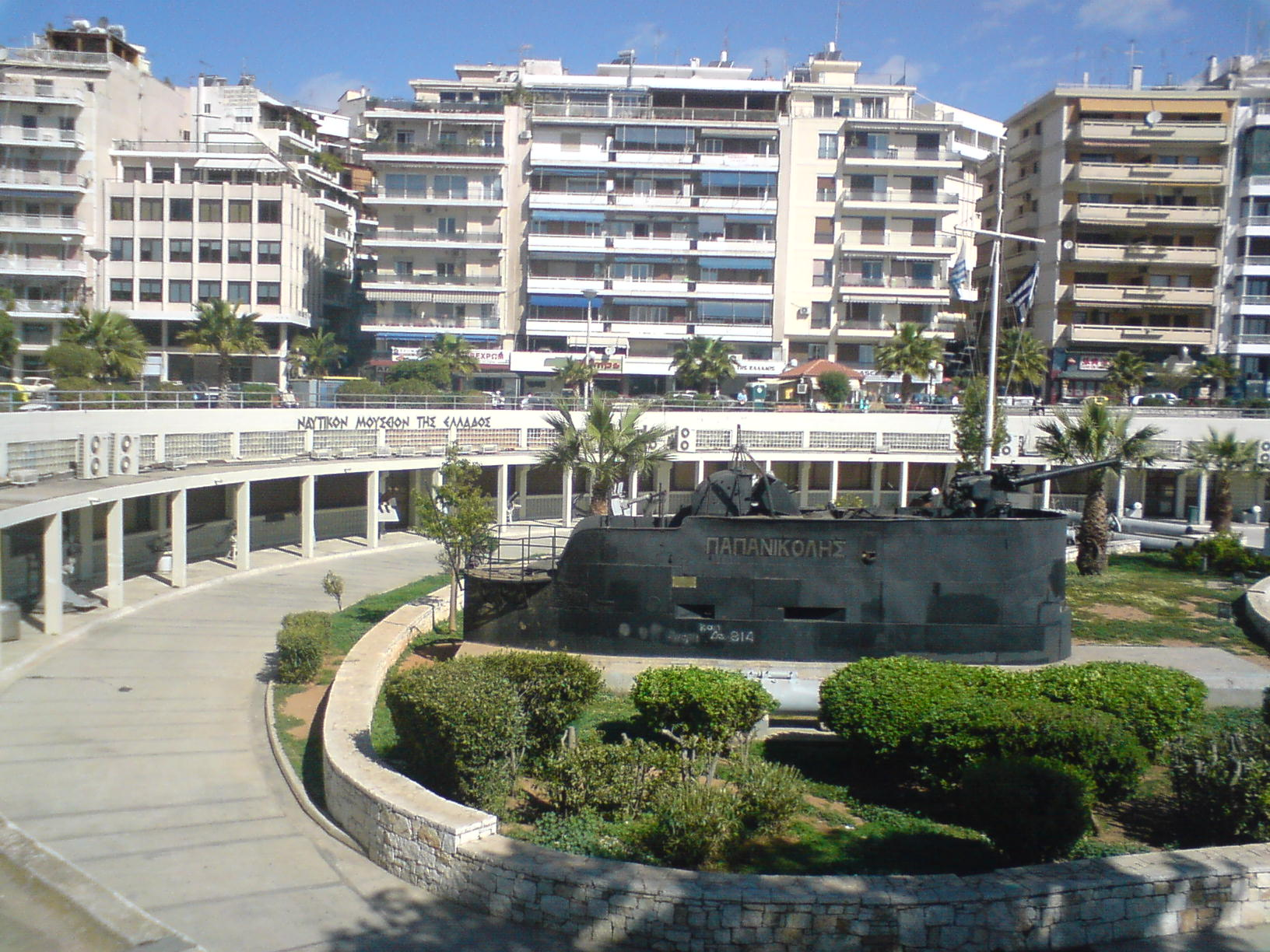
External view of the Hellenic Maritime Museum in Freatida.

Piraeus is home to several museums and other institutions of great interest within their field. The Archaeological Museum of Piraeus displays objects from classical antiquity found at the area of Piraeus and the greater coastal zone, typical of the history and culture of the ancient city. The city also houses the Hellenic Maritime Museum, with exhibits relating to the nautical tradition of Greece, the Merchant Shipping History Institute Exhibition, the Panos Aravantinos Decor Museum and the Museum of Electric Railways, hosted in the Piraeus station. The Municipal Art Gallery and the Municipal Library, one of the largest in Greece, are also prominent within the culture of Piraeus.

=== Sport ===
Peace and Friendship Stadium

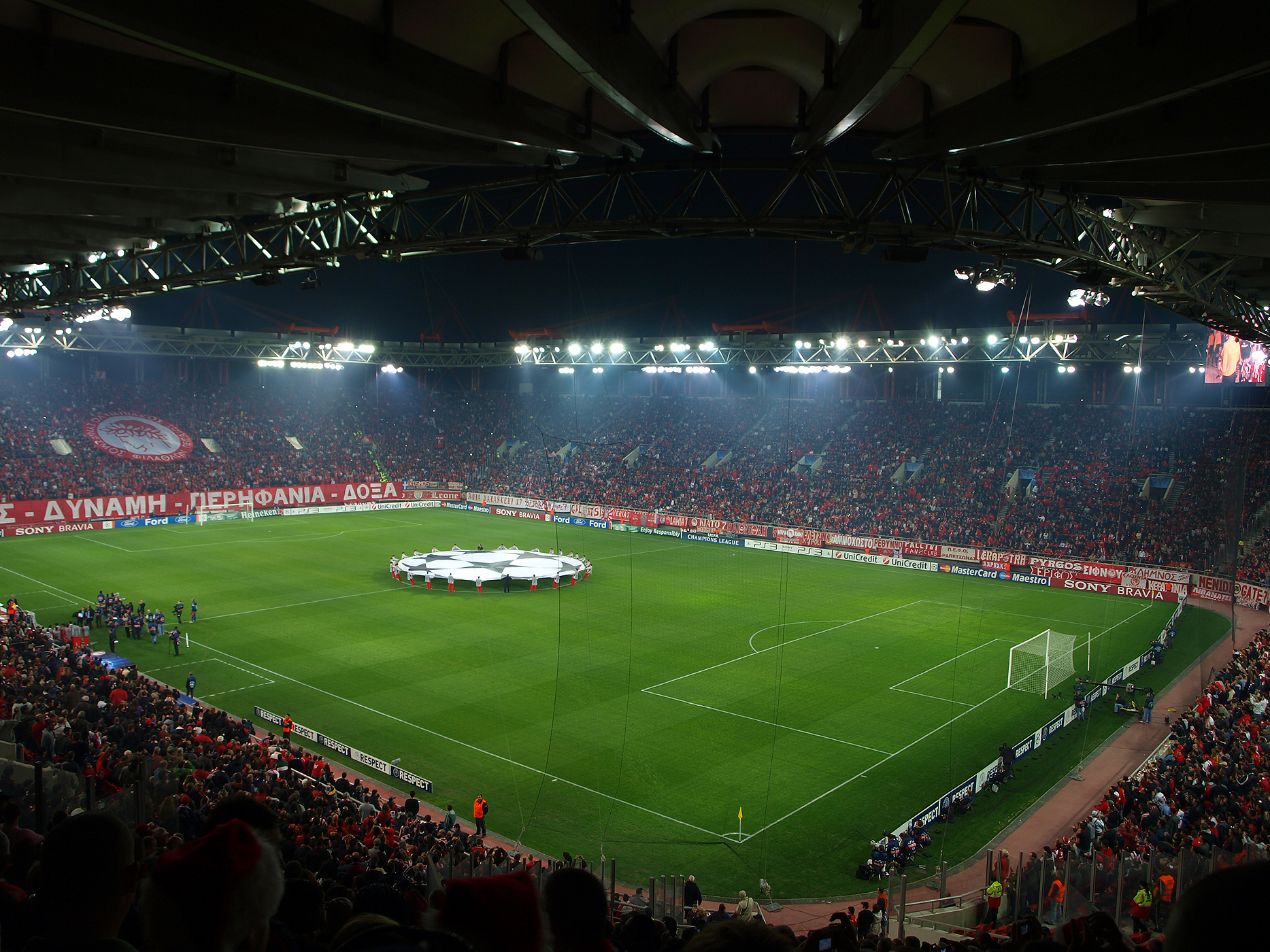
Inside the Karaiskakis Stadium

Traditionally, Piraeus has played a major role in Greek sport. The city boasts one of the most popular and one of the most prestigious Greek multisport clubs, Olympiacos CFP. The other major club is Ethnikos Piraeus, with a long athletic tradition, while other historic clubs are Atromitos Piraeus F.C. and Peiraikos Syndesmos.

In football, Olympiacos F.C. is the most successful football club in Greece, having won by far more titles than any other Greek football club, and its ground is at the Karaiskakis Stadium, in Neo Faliro. Ethnikos Piraeus F.C. had a longstanding presence in Super League Greece and also used the Karaiskakis Stadium as home ground, but in recent years the club has competed in lower divisions and currently plays home matches at the Helleniko Stadium, in Ellinikon. In basketball, Olympiacos B.C. is the only major club from Piraeus, one of the most successful at domestic and European level, and its home arena is the Peace and Friendship Stadium, while the volleyball department of the same club, Olympiacos S.C., is the dominant domestically and has made great success in European competitions as well. Piraeus rides really high in water polo, where Ethnikos Piraeus and Olympiacos departments have entirely dominated in Greece; the first is considered the "Emperor" of the sport and the latter is the only Greek water polo club to have been crowned European Champion.

First class sporting facilities can be found in Piraeus. The Karaiskakis Stadium, built in 1885 as a bicycle track, enlarged in 1964 and completely rebuilt in 2004, is the second largest football venue in Greece with a capacity of 33,334 and one of the most modern in Europe. It hosted the 1971 UEFA Cup Winners' Cup Final and several games of the football tournament in the 2004 Summer Olympics, while it was used as a velodrome in the 1896 Summer Olympics. The Peace and Friendship Stadium, part of the Faliro Coastal Zone Olympic Complex and built in 1985 opposite to the Karaiskakis Stadium, is the second largest indoor arena in the country and one of the most impressive around Europe, having hosted multiply major international events in several sports, including the volleyball tournament in the 2004 Athens Olympics, the 1998 FIBA World Championship, the EuroBasket 1987 and the Final Four of the Euroleague 1993.

Sport clubs based inside the boundaries of Piraeus municipality
Club	Founded	Sports	Achievements
Peiraikos Syndesmos	1893	Basketball, Volleyball, Track and Field	Panhellenic titles in women basketball
Ethnikos	1923	Football, Basketball, Volleyball, Water Polo and others	Panhellenic title in football, most time winner in Greek Water Polo
Olympiacos	1925	Football, Basketball, Volleyball, Water Polo, Track and Field and others	Arguably the most successful Greek club, many titles in several sports, most time winner in Greek football and men's volleyball
Atromitos Piraeus	1926	Football	Presence in Gamma Ethniki
AOF Porfyras	1957	Basketball, Volleyball	Presence in A1 Ethniki volleyball women

== Maritime industry ==
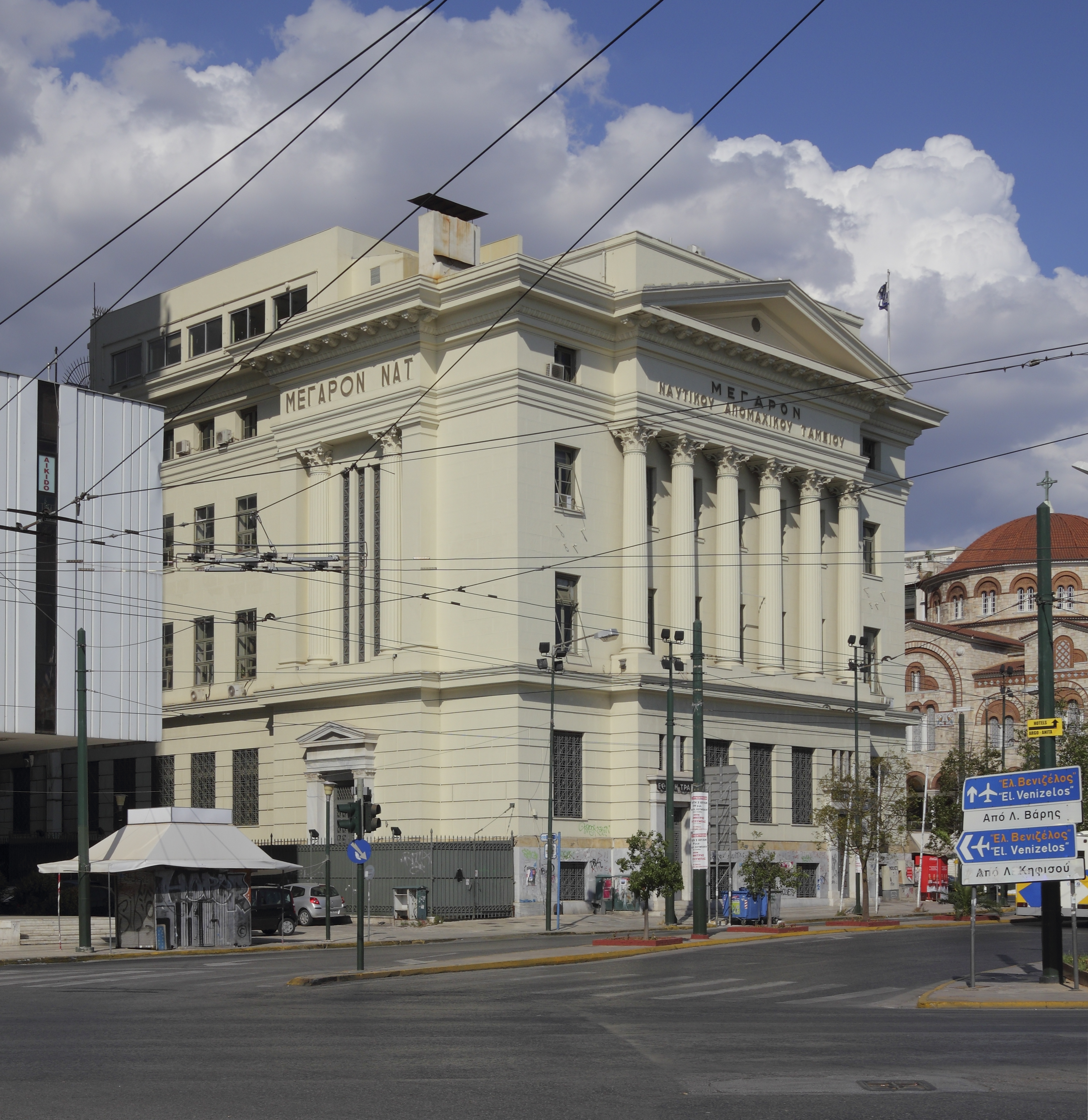
The building of the Maritime Retirement Fund (NAT)

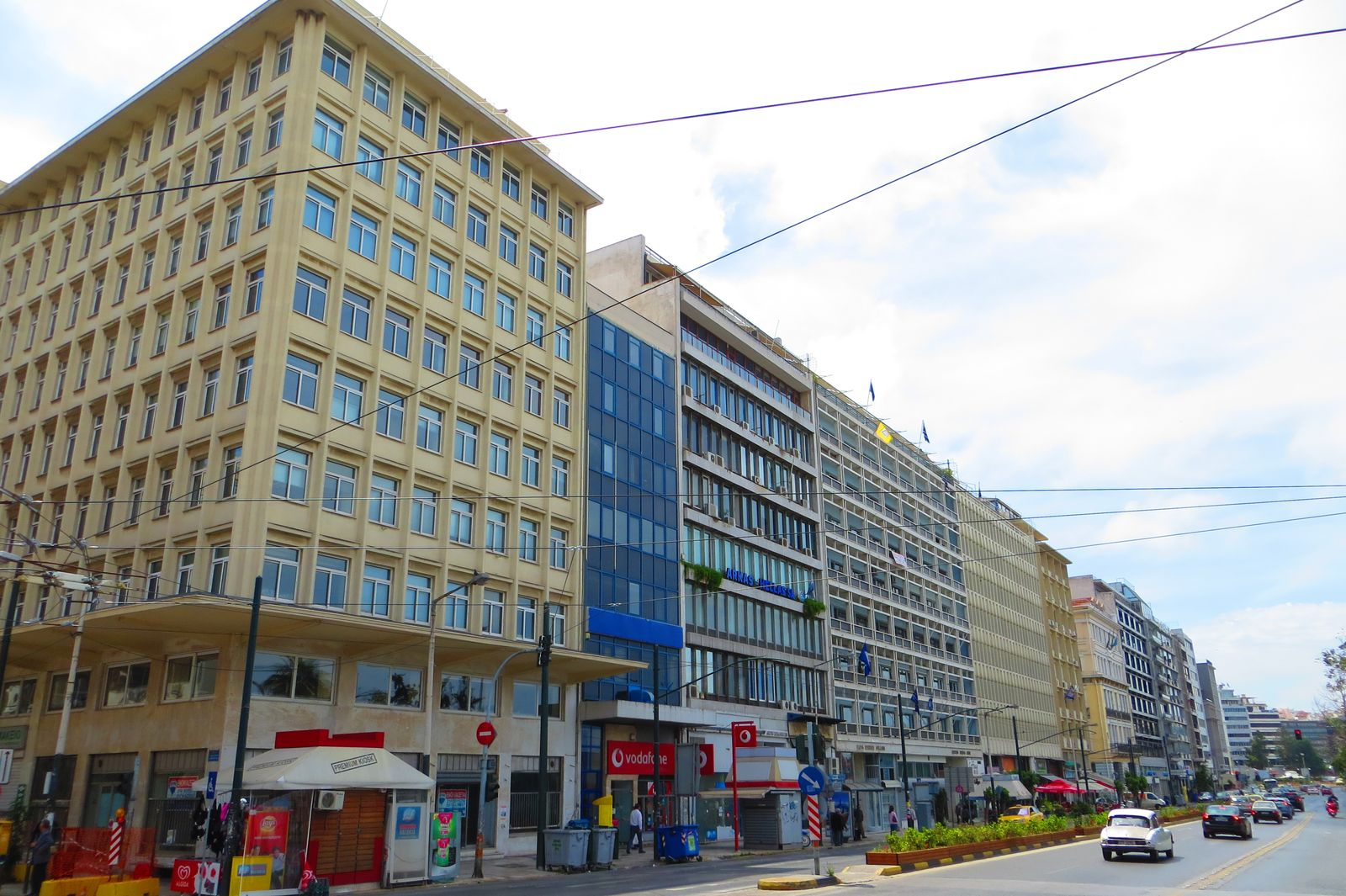
Akti Miaouli at the port.

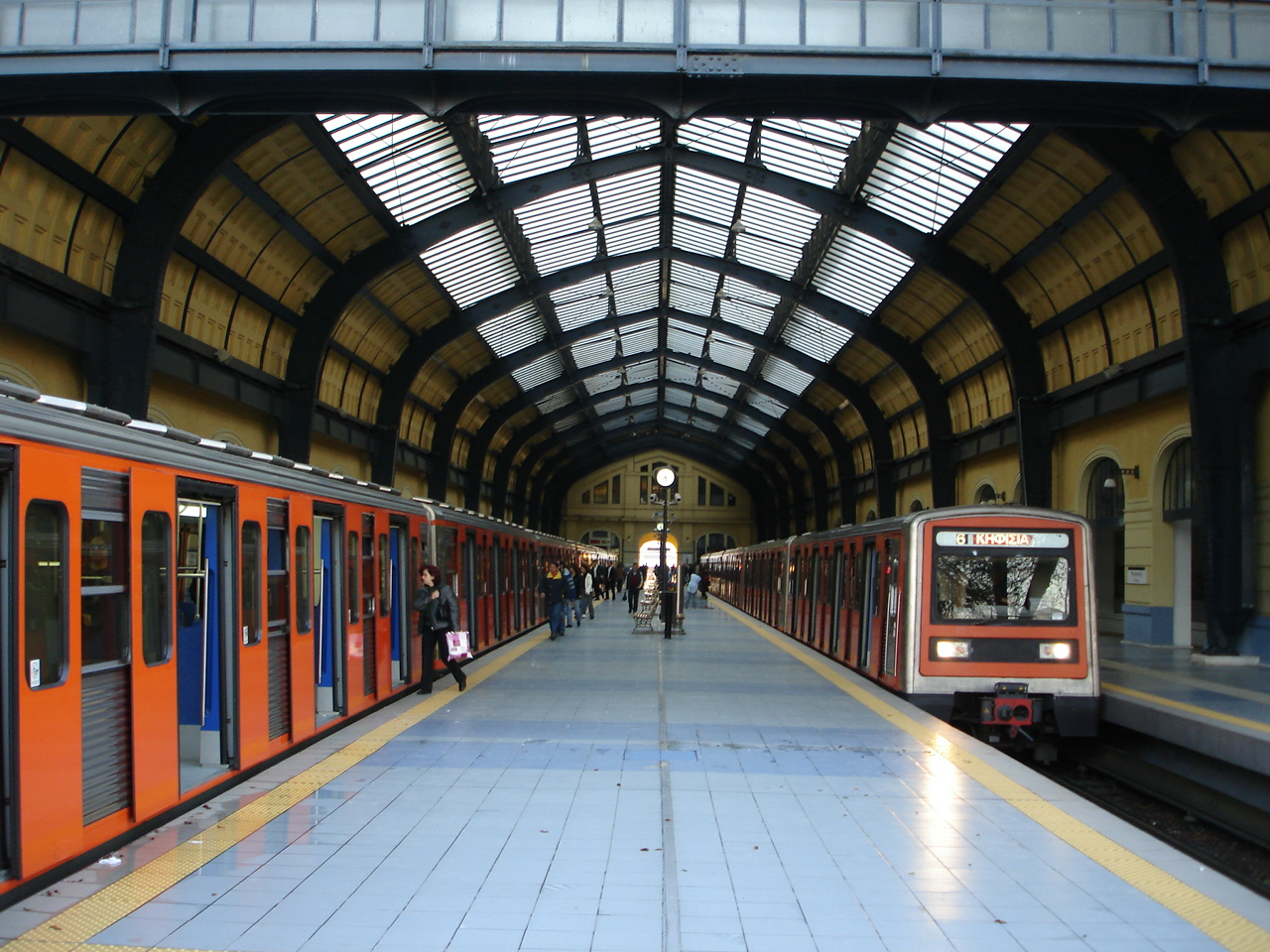
Inside view of Piraeus station, next to the seaport.

In addition to being the largest marine–based shipping centre of Greece, Piraeus is also the commercial hub of Greek shipping, with most of Greece's shipowners having offices there, largely centred around the street Akti Miaouli. In its capacities as host to Greek shipping, Piraeus has been affected significantly by the various governments of Greece. Following World War II, the Greek government attempted to nationalize the proceeds of the insurance payments given to Greek shipowners who had lost vessels as a result of those vessels having been commandeered by the Allied Forces; the insurance had been provided by Lloyd's of London and guaranteed by the coalition of the allied forces. Although Greek shipowners ultimately won their case against the Greek government in the British courts, most were uninterested in continuing to base their headquarters in Piraeus, both out of distrust of the Greek government, and because the war had left the Greater Athens area in a state of severe poverty. As a result, Greece's shipowners left Piraeus en masse in favour of operations in London, New York, Alexandria and other major shipping cities.

Today the port of Piraeus ranks 7th in Europe and the 1st in the Mediterranean in terms of TEUs transported through it each year.

=== 1967 military junta ===
In 1967, when a group of colonels staged a coup d'état against the government, in order to increase desperately needed revenues, the junta offered lavish incentives for Greek shipowners to bring their companies back to Piraeus. This included both tax incentives and other inducements, as highlighted by the fact that Aristotle Onassis was allowed to purchase the entire island of Skorpios, which otherwise would have been a violation of Greek coastline laws.

=== 1974 democratic government ===
After the junta fell in 1974, the successive democratic government generally maintained the deregulation of Greek-based shipping, and many shipowners have maintained commercial operations there since. Today, however, as a result of traffic congestion plaguing the Athens area, and the fact that most shipowners reside in the lavish northern suburbs of Athens, many shipowners have opted once again to move their bases away from Piraeus to Northern Athens.

=== Shipping today ===
After the post-2008 financial crisis collapse of global shipping, the port was gradually acquired by China Ocean Shipping Company (COSCO), which is a Chinese state-owned enterprise. Under COSCO, Piraeus has become a busy port, rising from traffic of 400,000 containers in 2008 to nearly five million containers in 2018. Most European trade with China occurs via Greek ships, including through Piraeus.

With an annual number of 8.1 million passengers by 2015, Piraeus also became the EU's sixth-largest port in terms of passenger transportation. The central port serves ferry routes to almost every island in the eastern portion of Greece, the island of Crete, the Cyclades, the Dodecanese, and much of the northern and the eastern Aegean Sea, while the western part of the port is used for cargo services. The following operators serve the port:

- Minoan Lines
- ANEK Lines
- Blue Star Ferries
- Hellenic Seaways
- Celestyal Cruises
- Monarch Classic Cruises

== Transport ==
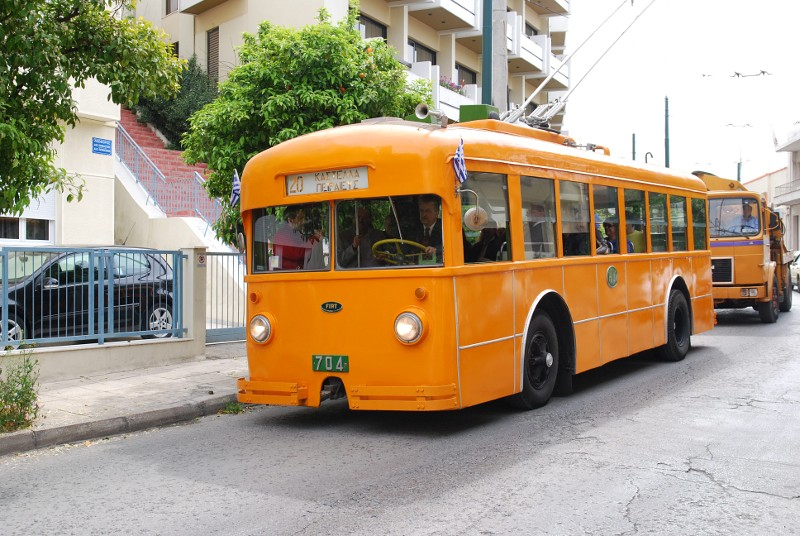
Preserved vintage trolleybus of Piraeus-Kastella line.

Piraeus is served by buses and trolleybuses (OSY), Suburban Railway, the Metro Lines 1 and 3 and the Athens Tram. Piraeus station refers to the two railway stations (Metro, and Suburban Railway) located next to the seaport.

== Landmarks ==
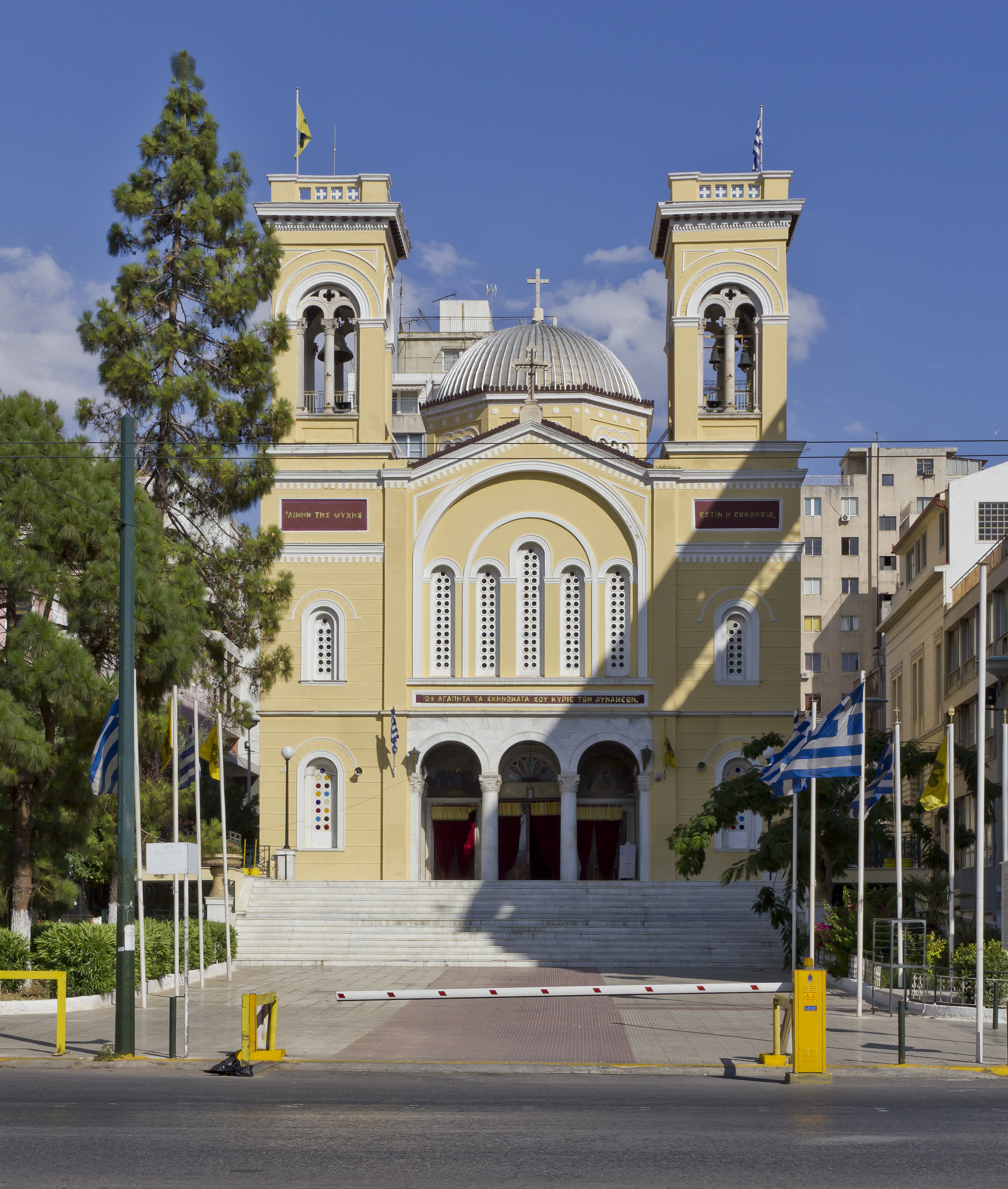
Church of Saint Spyridon; patron saint of Piraeus

Piraeus is marked by the diversity of culture among its neighbourhoods. The hill of Kastella is one of the most prosperous and attractive neighbourhoods, with a panoramic view over Athens basin and the Saronic Gulf. Its elegance comes from its numerous neo-classical mansions, while the Veakeio Theater and a church dedicated to the Prophet Elijah are the most popular buildings. The coastal area of Neo Faliro has been upgraded and is also prominent, with the Peace and Friendship Stadium and the Karaiskakis Stadium, an indoor arena and a football ground respectively lying opposite one another, predominating. Mikrolimano and Bay of Zea, are the smaller harbours of Piraeus acts as Marinas, attract large numbers of visitors with their picturesque vistas and vigorous nightlife. Kaminia, by contrast, is a working-class neighbourhood which still preserves the traditional look of an earlier period. The Municipal Theater in the center of Piraeus was built in 1885 and remains an impressive neo-classical building. Located across from the Neo-Byzantine Piraeus Cathedral, it forms one of the most renowned landmarks of the city and a popular meeting place. The 1898 neoclassical Evangelistria Church, in the Evangelistria district, is also notable.

Rondini Square is an archaeological site which forms part of the ancient city of Piraeus.

== Districts ==
- Agios Neilos
- Agia Sophia
- Freattyda
- Kallipoli
- Kaminia
- Kastella
- Maniatika
- Mikrolimano
- Terpsithea (Trouba)

== Cinema ==
Movies filmed in Piraeus include:

- Stella (1955 film)
- The Angry Hills (film)
- Never on Sunday
- The Red Lanterns
- The Burglars, starring Jean-Paul Belmondo

== Twin towns – sister cities ==
Piraeus is twinned with:

- Baltimore, United States (1982)
- Galaţi, Romania (1985)
- Marseille, France (1984)
- Odesa, Ukraine (1993)
- Ostrava, Czech Republic
- Rosario, Argentina
- Shanghai, China (1985)
- Saint Petersburg, Russia (1965)
- Tartus, Syria (2022)
- Varna, Bulgaria
- Worcester, United States

== Mayors of Piraeus ==
- Kyriakos Serfiotis (1835–1841)
- Petros Skylitsis-Homiridis (1841–1845) and (1848–1854)
- Antonios Theoharis (1845–1848)
- Loukas Rallis (1855–1866)
- Demetrios Moutzopoulos (1866–1874)
- Tryfon Moutzopoulos (1874–1883) and (1895–1903)
- Aristides Skylitsis (1883–1887)
- Theodoros Retsinas (1887–1895)
- Pavlos Damalis (1903–1907)
- Dimosthenis Skylitsis-Homiridis (1907–1914)
- Anastasios Panagiotopoulos (1914–1932)
- Michail Rinopoulos (1932)
- Athanasios N. Miaoulis (1932)
- Sotiris Stratigis (1932–1938)

- Michail Manoussos (1938–1941)
- Panagiotis Kyriakides (1941-1945)
- Georgios Andrianopoulos (1951–1966)
- Georgios Kyriakakos (1966–1967)
- Aristidis Skylitsis (1967–1974)
- Vasilios Zeppos (1974–1975)
- Anastasios Voulodimos (1975–1978)
- Georgios Kyriakakos (1978–1982)
- Ioannis Papaspyrou (1982–1986)
- Andreas Andrianopoulos (1987–1990)
- Stelios Logothetis (1991–1998)
- Christos Agrapidis (1999–2006)
- Panagiotis Fasoulas (2007–2010)
- Vasilis Michaloliakos (2011–2014)
- Ioannis Moralis (2014–present)

== Notable people ==
- Sophia Antoniadis, classical scholar
- Spyridon Manousakis (Spiros Arion), professional wrestler
- Giorgos Dalaras, singer
- Georgios B. Giannakis, computer scientist and inventor
- Jannis Kounellis, artist
- Emmanuel Kriaras, philologist
- Diamanto Koumbaki, partisan
- Dimos Moutsis, composer
- Michalis Oikonomou, painter
- Dimitrios Diamantakos, Footballer
- Dimitris Papamichael, actor
- Katina Paxinou, actress
- Dimitris Pikionis, architect
- Dimitris Rontiris, actor and director
- Nondas Samartzidis, water polo player
- Costas Simitis, Prime Minister of Greece
- Pantelis Thalassinos, singer and songwriter
- Yannis Tsarouchis, artist and painter
- Charilaos Vasilakos, Olympic medalist
- Aimilios Veakis, actor
- Thanassis Vengos, actor
- Tolis Voskopoulos, singer
- Nicola Zaccaria, Greek bass
- Dimitra Asilian, water polo player
- Anastasios of Albania, archbishop of Albania

== Universities and institutes ==
- University of Piraeus, established in 1938, operates four schools with more than 9.000 registered students.

== Gallery ==
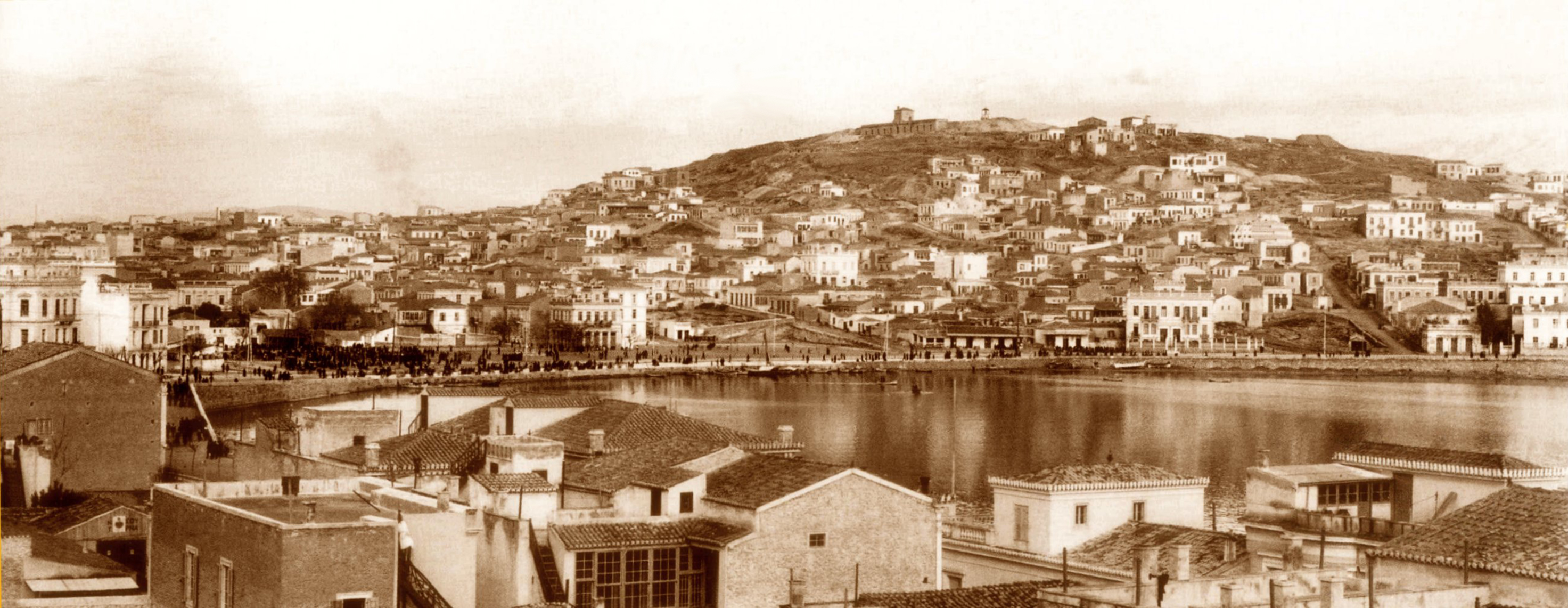
Piraeus in the late 19th century

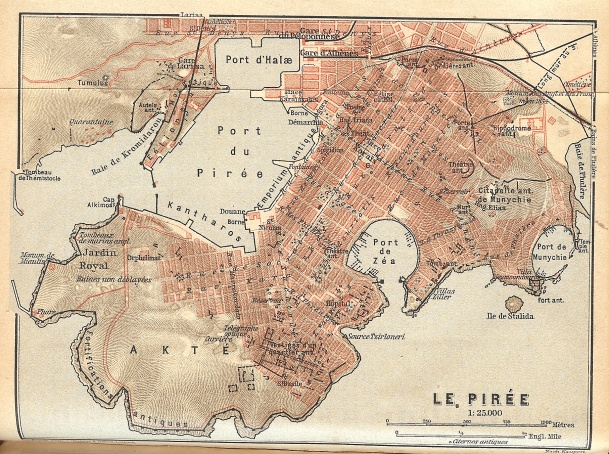
Map of Piraeus, 1908

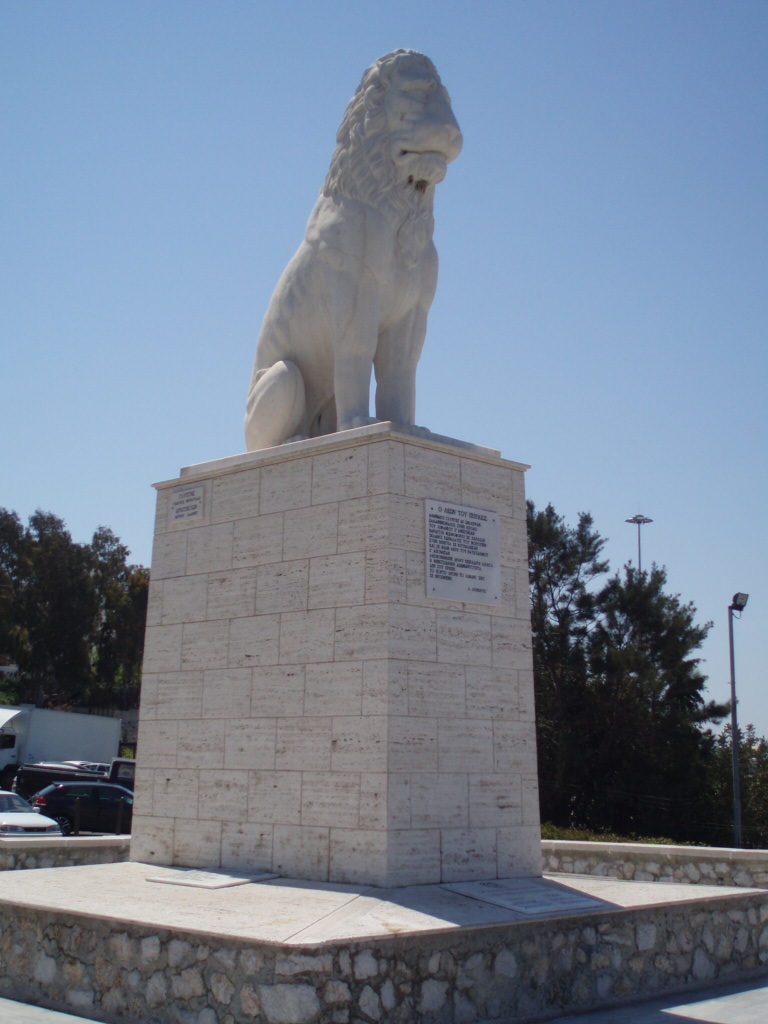
A modern copy of the "Piraeus Lion"

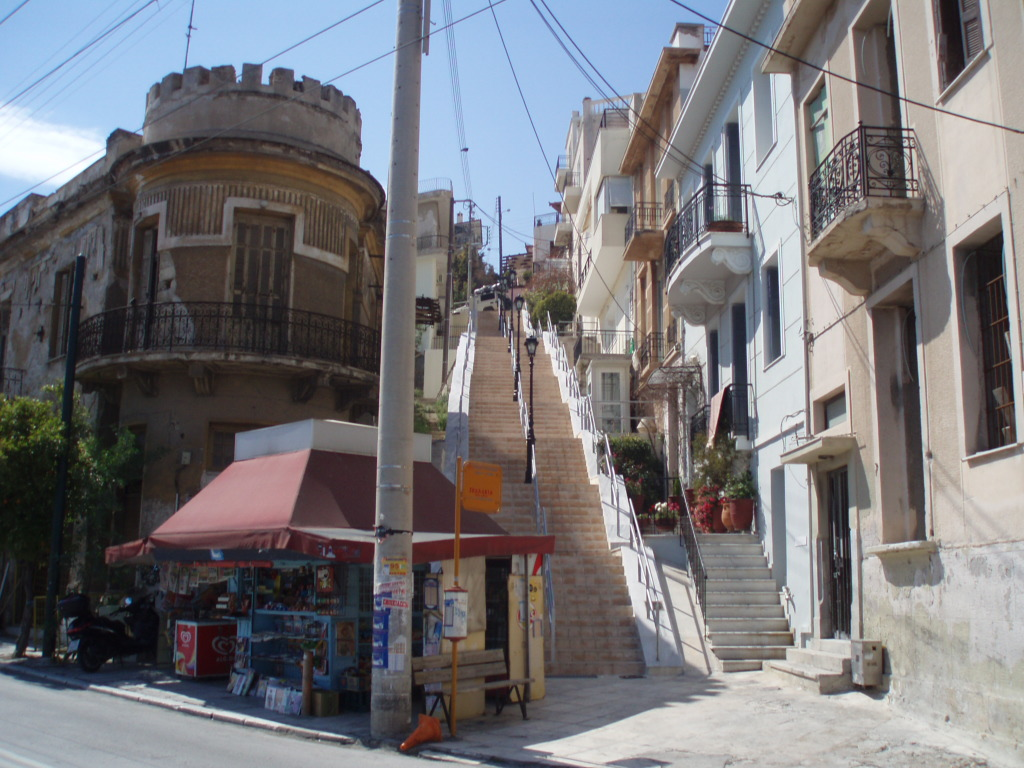
View of Kastella

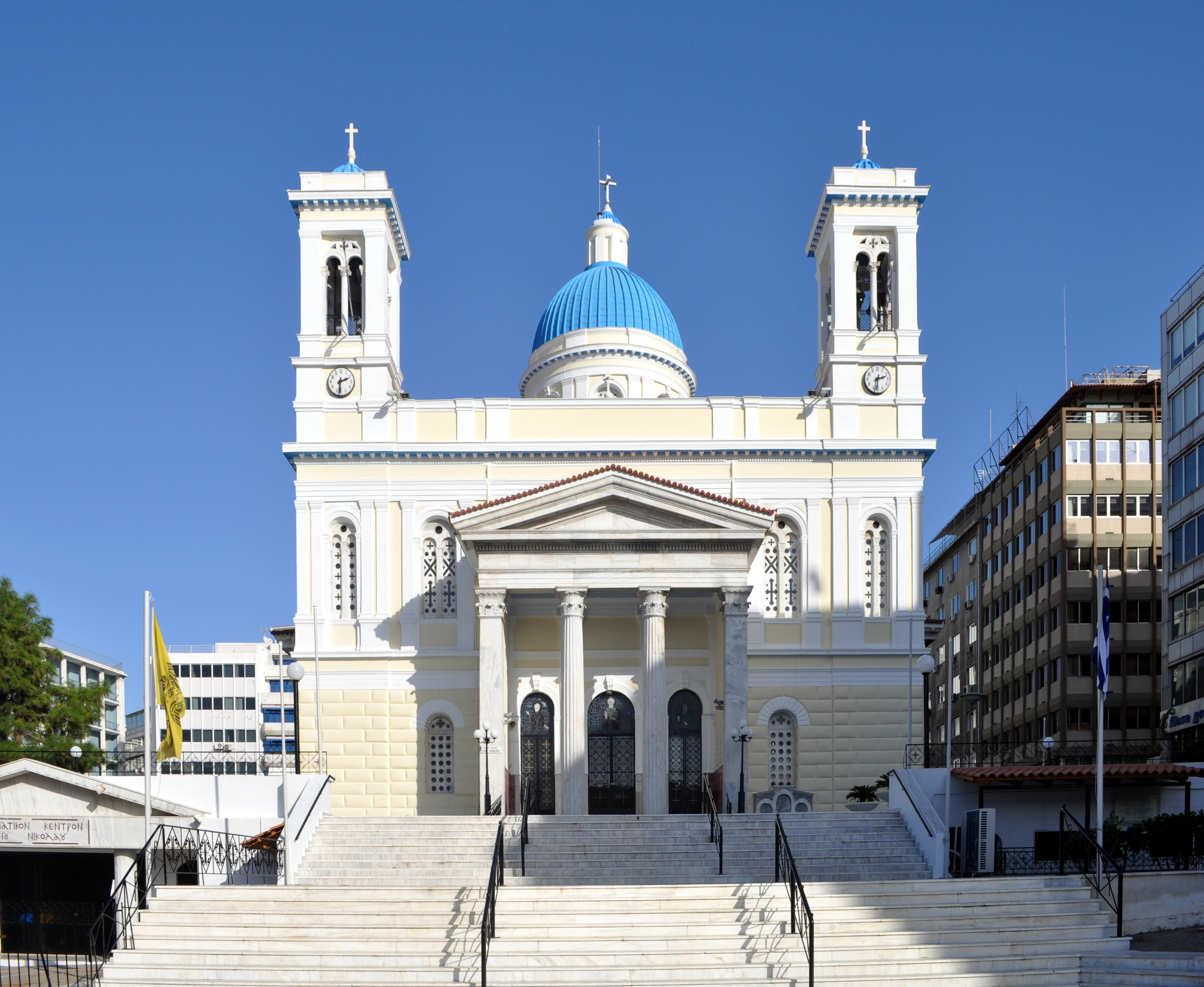
The church of St. Nicholas

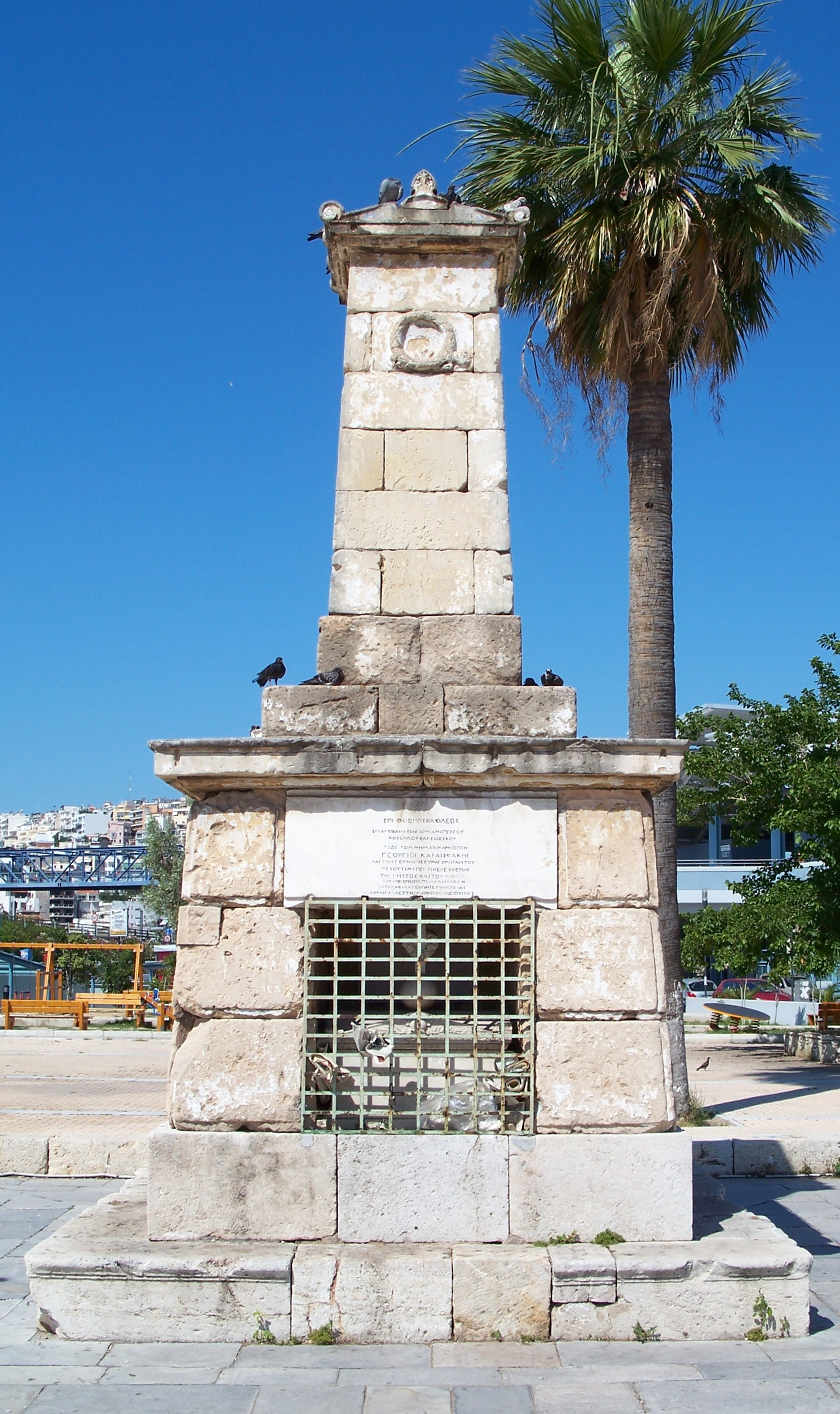
Monument to Georgios Karaiskakis

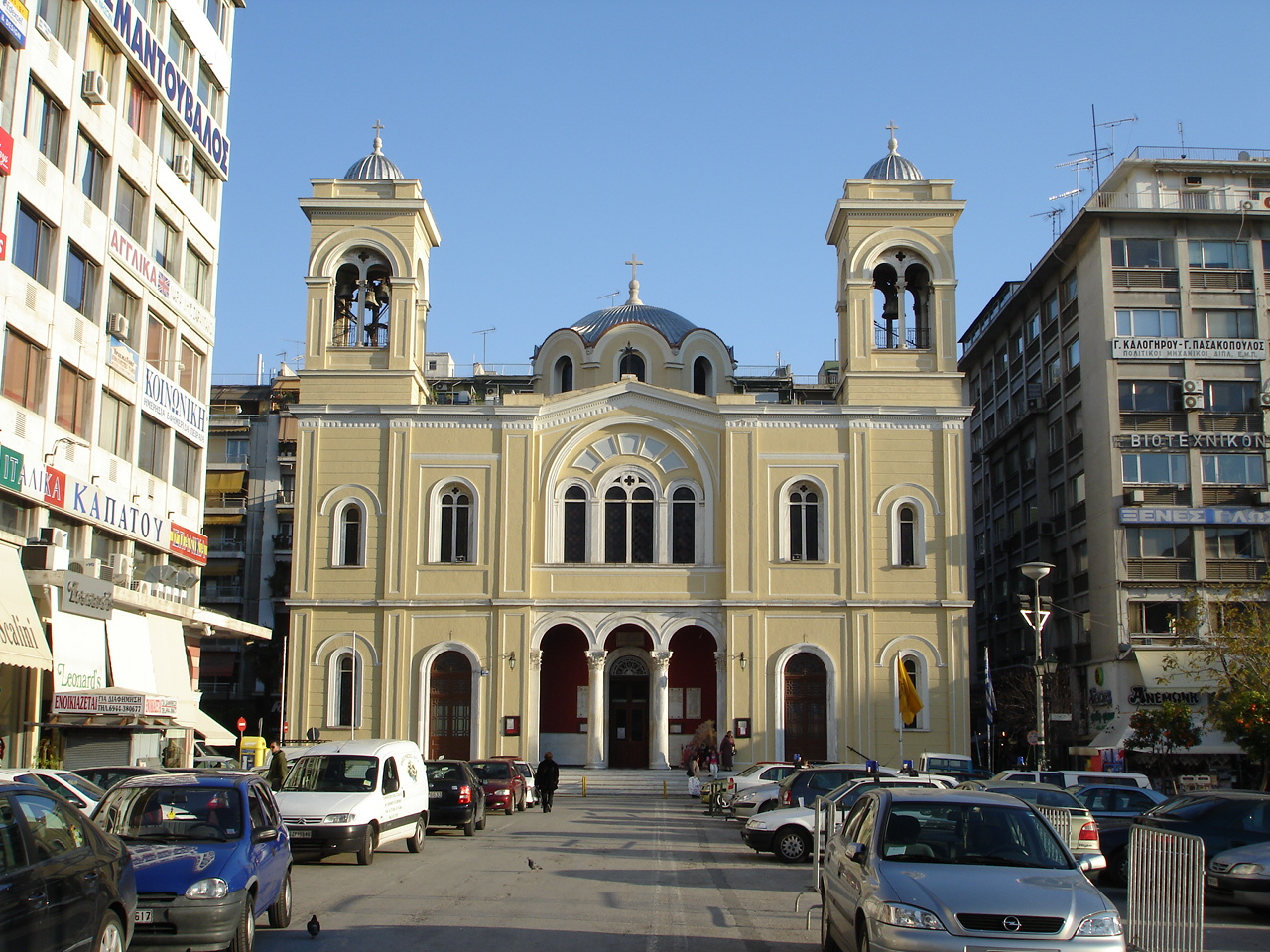
Church of Sts. Constantine and Helen

== See also ==
- List of settlements in Attica
- Never on Sunday – Film set in Piraeus
- Tintin and the Golden Fleece
