= Rondini Square (Piraeus) =

Archaeological site in Piraeus, Athens

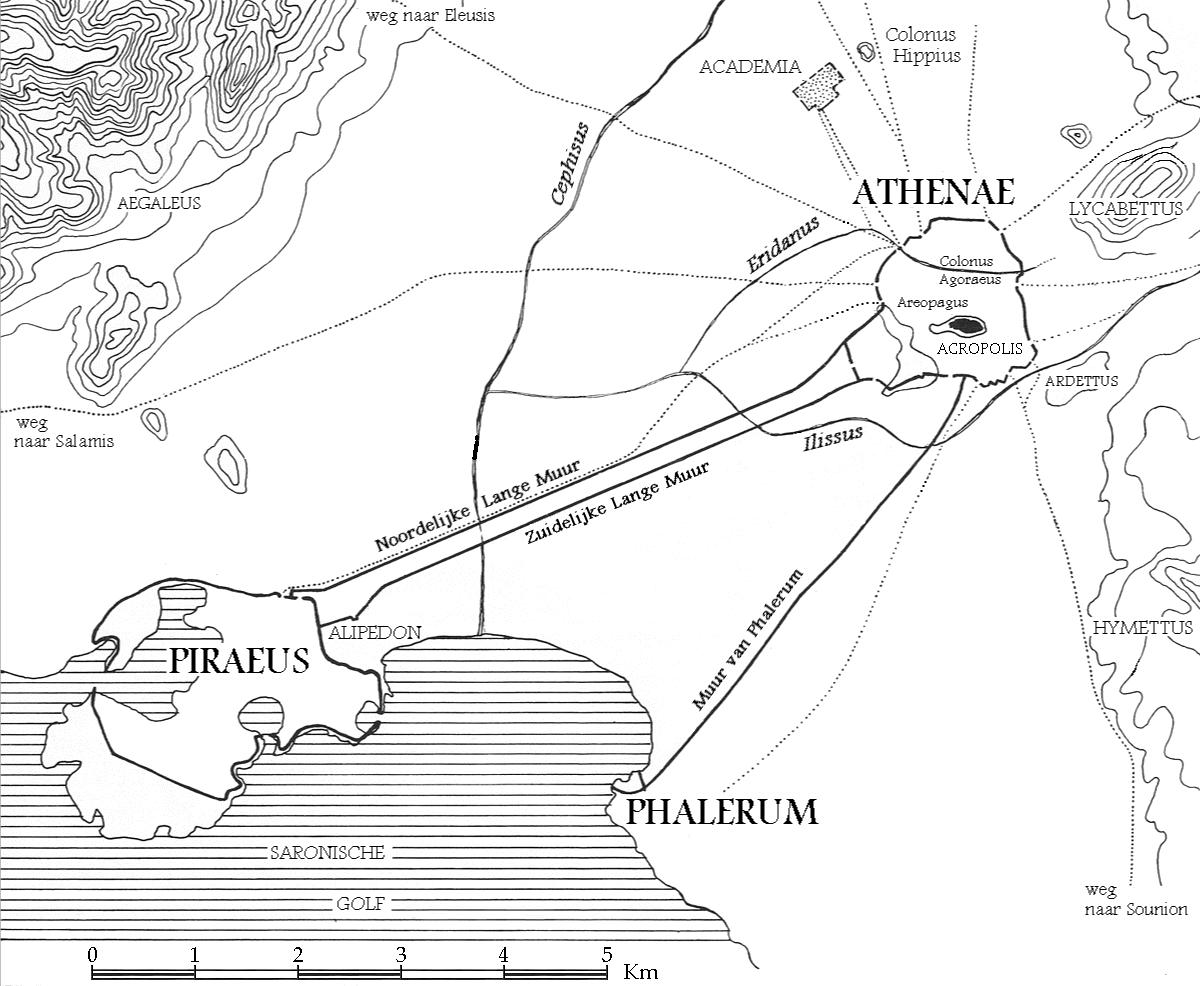
- Map of Piraeus and Athens, showing the Long Walls (Μακρὰ Τείχη [makra tei̯kʰɛː]) that once connected the two urban centres
- Type: Archaeological site
- Periods: Classical Period
- Cultures: Greek
- Satellite of: Athens
- Location: Piraeus, Athens
- Region: Attica

History
- Built: 493 BC
- Built by: Hippodamus and others

Site notes
- Material: stone
- Condition: Ruined
- Owner: Private
- Management: Ephorate of Antiquities of West Attika, Piraeus and Islands
- Public access: Visible from road

Rondini Square is an archaeological site which forms part of the ancient city of Piraeus, in Athens, Greece.

== History ==
Themistokles built the walls and city gates of Piraeus in 493 BC and according to Thucydides this marked the foundation of the city of Piraeus.

Hippodamus planned the street pattern of Piraeus using the scheme of Pythagoras comprising simple mathematical proportions to create city blocks. These formed the building plots and streets of the Piraeus port of ancient Greece.

Hippodamus divided Piraeus into three parts: the commercial harbor, the naval station, the sacred space and the marketplaces. Around these elements were located the private spaces comprising houses and workshops.

== Morphology ==
Rondini Square was an area of ancient houses and shops and it was uncovered in 1980 when excavations for the Piraeus Courthouse revealed a large section of an urban block of the ancient city. The block shows the remains of residential buildings from the late Classical Period to the early Byzantine Period with the best preserved houses dating from the Roman Period. The excavations revealed houses from the original plan of Hippodamus, as well as narrow alleys, which formed secondary passages with a width of 2 to 3 metres. These are sited to the north and south of the block.

The excavations also revealed the ancient central street of Piraeus known as the Plateia Odos which correlates with the modern street called Iroon Politechniou, and which runs along the east side of the archaeological site.

In the centre of the block are two Roman houses, one of which has a floor plan of 610.50 square metres in extent and another which has a floor plan of 628.26 square metres with a central peristyle. The rooms of the second house are located around a courtyard. Originally, the houses had single-room workshops along the eastern side of the block, with access from the street. In the fourth century the second house had multiple occupants and was used like an apartment building.

== Archaeological finds ==
The excavations for the Piraeus courthouse also revealed coins, household equipment, imported amphorae, and measures and weights made out of marble and lead. The excavations also revealed a couple of sekomata, used for measuring the volume of liquids. A marble fragment from first century BC was found and this comprises text in Ancient Greek which lists the maximum prices for items offered for sale in the ancient ephthopoleia (tripe-shop).

During the Roman period earlier material was re-used in the buildings, including fragments of sculptures from a funerary banquet, a herm (sculpture) and a statuette of Kybele.

== Gallery ==
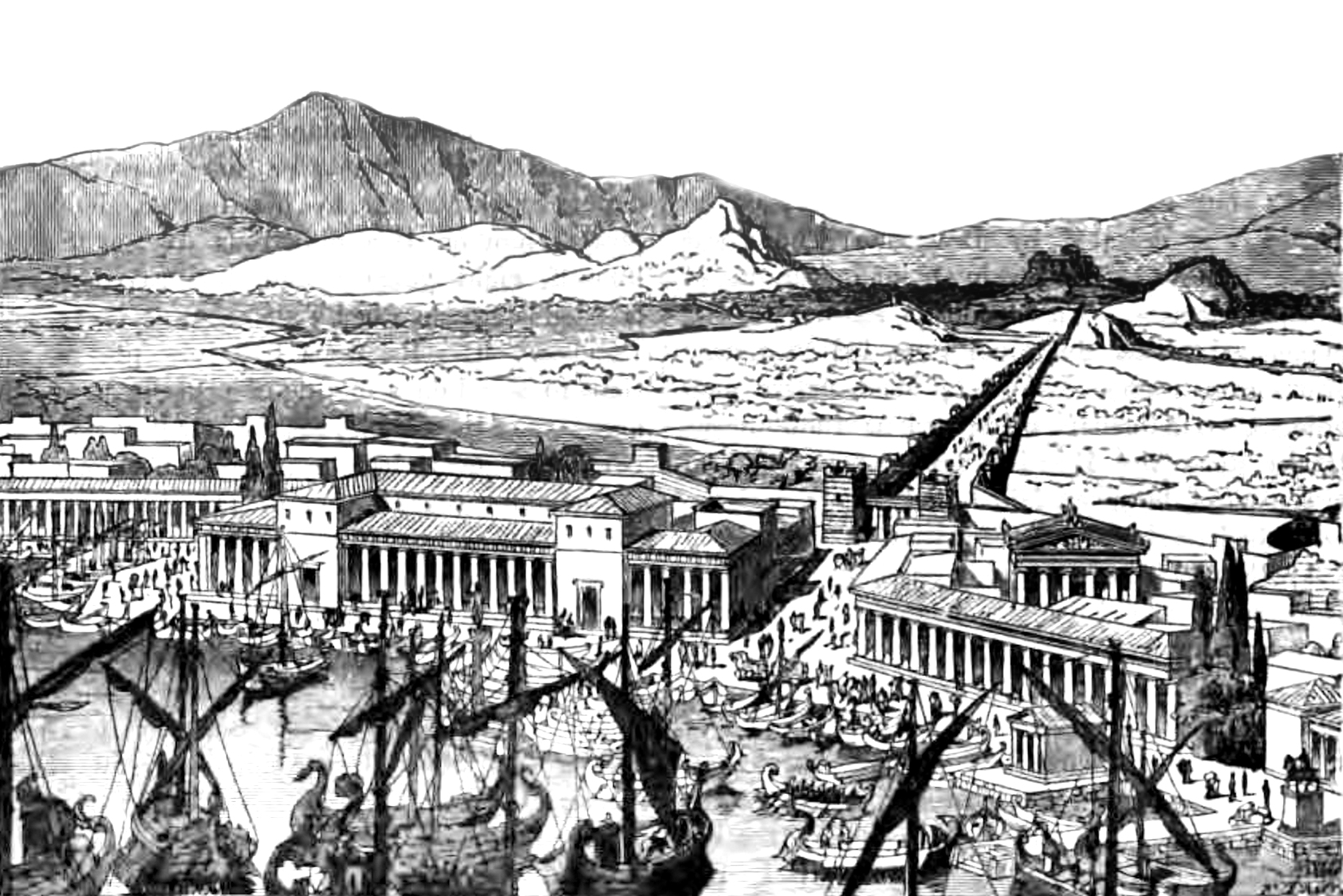
The Piraeus and the Long Walls of Athens.

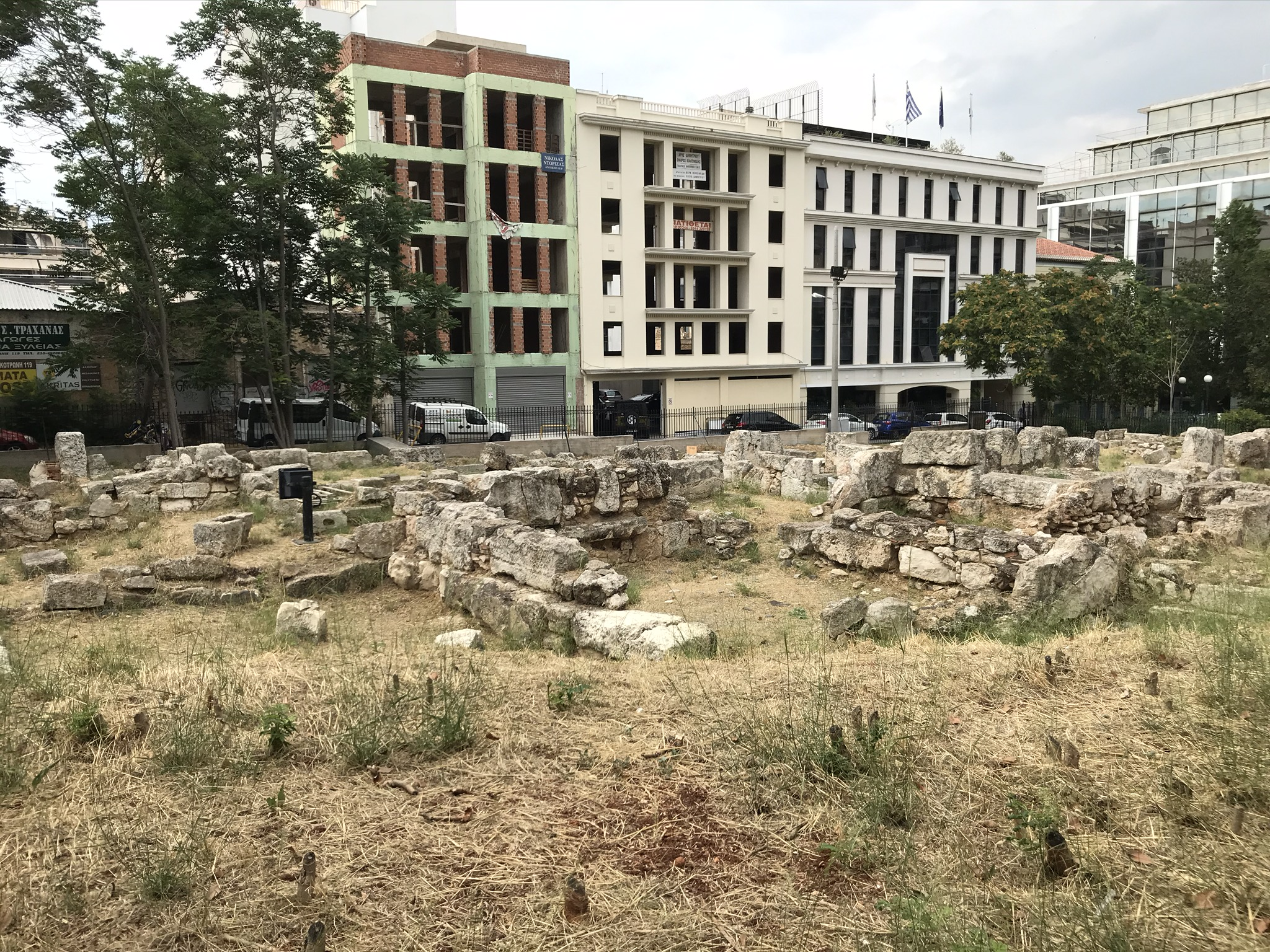

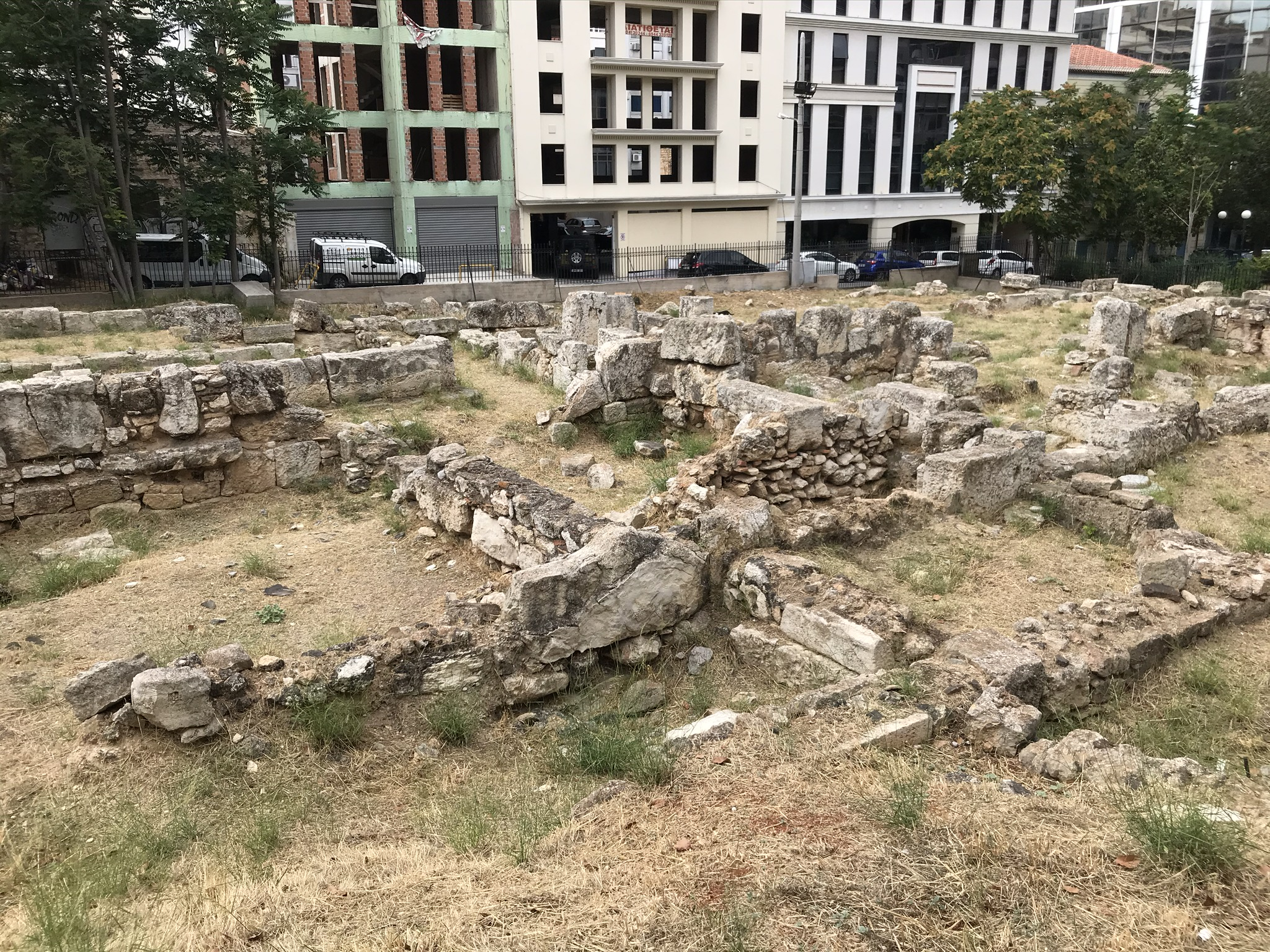

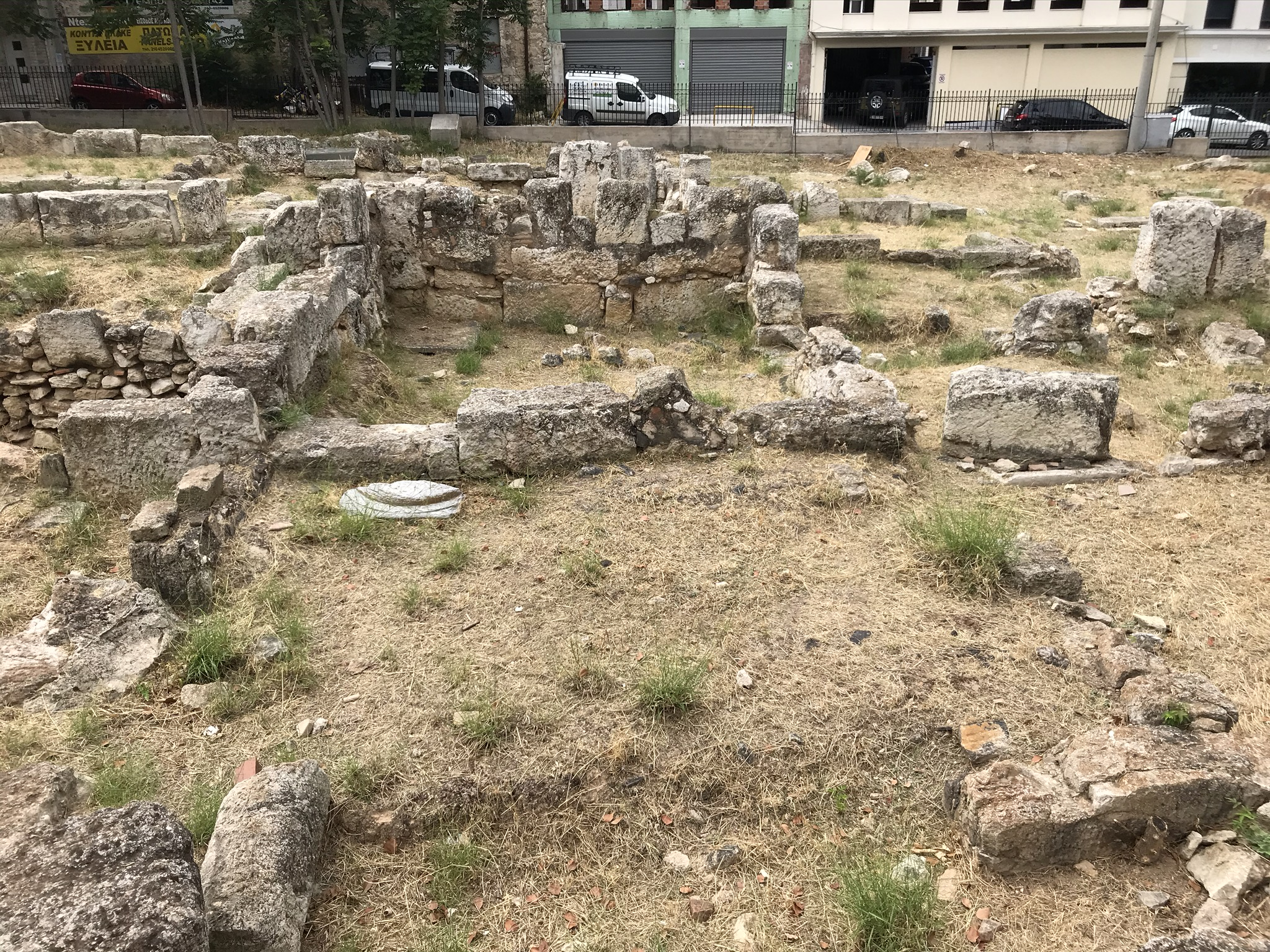

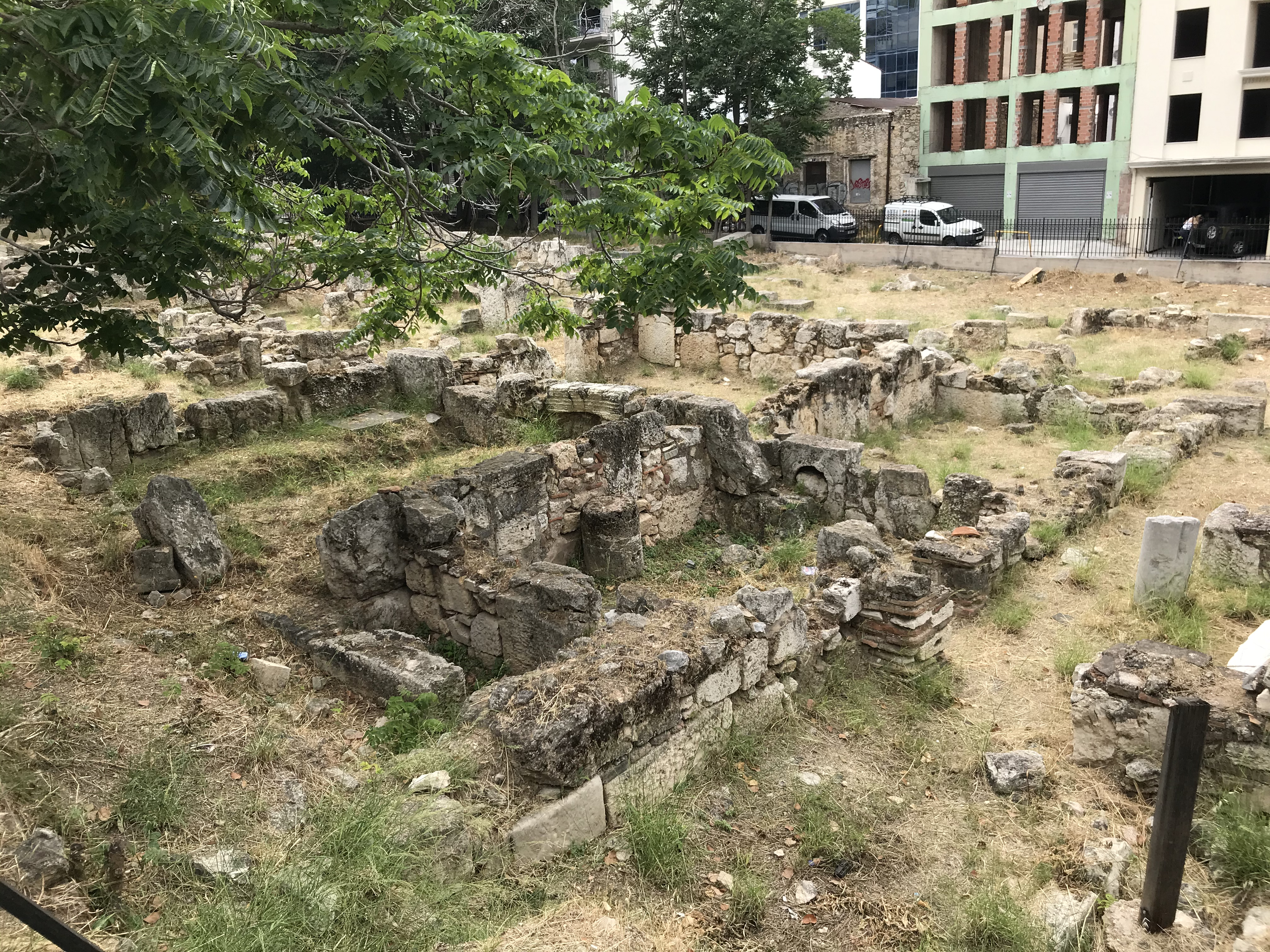
