= Yannis Moralis (politician) =

Mayor of Piraeus, Greece

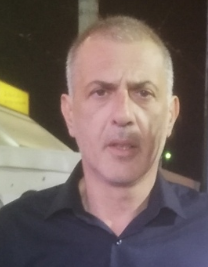
- Mayor of Piraeus Yannis Moralis

Mayor of Piraeus
- Incumbent
- Assumed office 1 September 2014

Personal details
- Born: 16 September 1968 (age 57) Athens, Greece
- Party: Independent

Yannis Moralis (Greek: Γιάννης Μώραλης, born in September 16, 1968 in Athens) is the current mayor of Piraeus, Greece and Vice President of Olympiacos F.C. He was elected mayor in May 2014 and took office in September of that year.

== Biography ==
Moralis was born in 1968 in Athens. His father, Petros Moralis, who was a founding member of PASOK and close personal friend of Prime Minister Andreas Papandreou, served as deputy minister of education in 1981–86, deputy minister of labor in 1987–89, and general secretary of the Ministry of National Economy in 1989–90.

Moralis studied economics in the University of Piraeus and was active in sports management and marketing. Beginning in 1995, he held a series of administrative posts at Olympiacos F.C. at the request of family friend Sokratis Kokkalis.

In 2010, Kokkalis sold Olympiacos to businessman Evangelos Marinakis; Moralis at first offered his resignation, but quickly established a friendly relationship with Marinakis, who appointed him vice-president of Olympiacos.

In May 2014, Moralis was elected Mayor of Piraeus, running as an independent candidate, without endorsement by any political party; his associates include both conservatives and socialists, as well as many former Olympiacos executives.

In November 2017 Moralis became the new president of Olympiacos for a few months.
