= Olympic beach =

Olympic beach may refer to:

- Olympiaki Akti, a coastal resort near Katerini, Greece
- List of Olympic Games beach venues, any one of a number of beach venues used during the Olympic Games
