= List of Olympic venues in beach volleyball =

For the Summer Olympics there are seven venues that have been or will be used for beach volleyball.

Games	Venue	Notes	Capacity	Ref.
1996 Atlanta	Atlanta Beach	Artificial beach	12,600	
2000 Sydney	Bondi Beach	Coastal beach	10,000	
2004 Athens	Faliro Olympic Beach Volleyball Centre	Artificial beach	8,000	
2008 Beijing	Chaoyang Park Beach Volleyball Ground	Artificial beach	12,000	
2012 London	Horse Guards Parade	Artificial beach	15,000	
2016 Rio de Janeiro	Copacabana Stadium	Coastal beach	12,000	
2020 Tokyo	Shiokaze Park	Artificial beach	12,000	
2024 Paris	Eiffel Tower Stadium	Artificial beach	12,000	
2028 Los Angeles	Alamitos Beach	Coastal beach	12,000	
2032 Brisbane	Broadbeach Park Stadium	Artificial beach	12,000	

== Gallery of venues ==
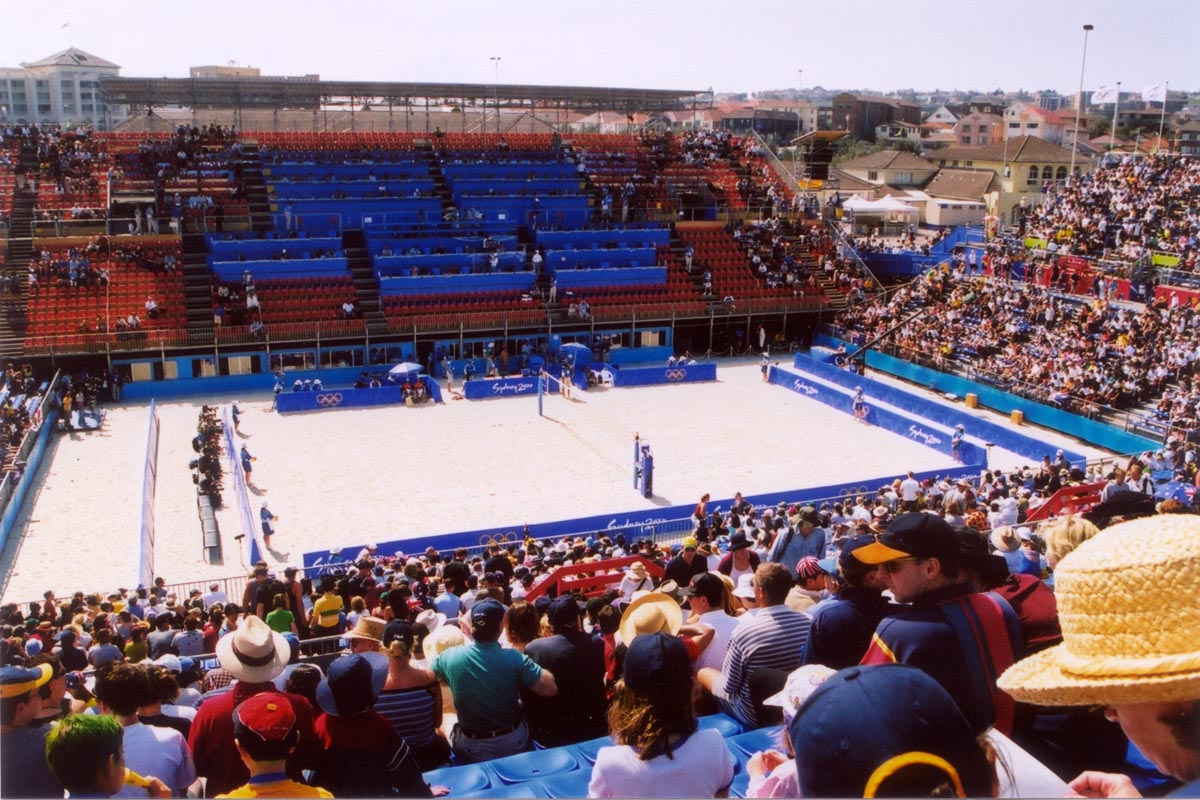
Bondi Beach hosted beach volleyball at the 2000 Summer Olympics in Sydney.

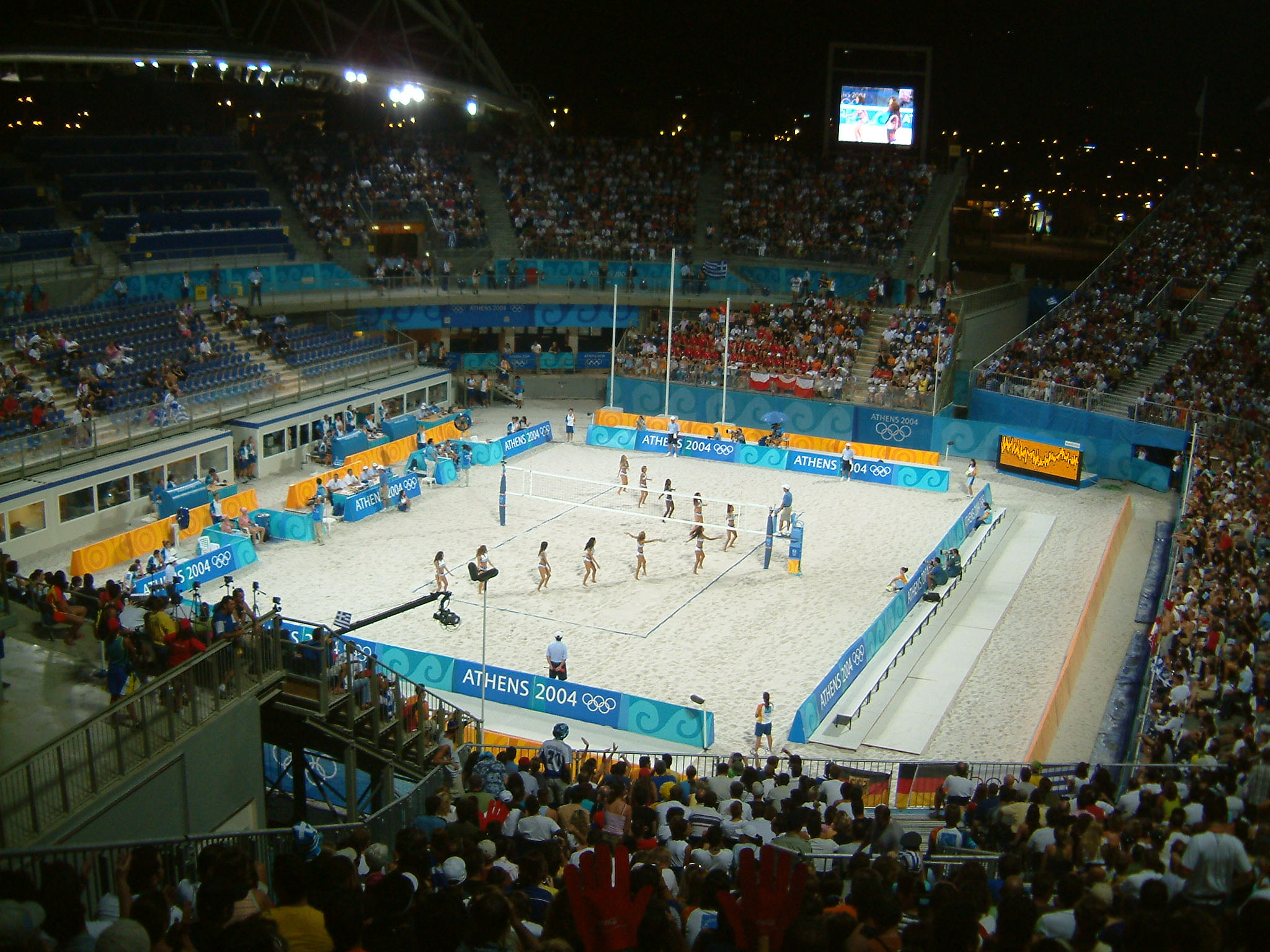
Faliro Olympic Beach Volleyball Centre hosted beach volleyball at the 2004 Summer Olympics in Athens.

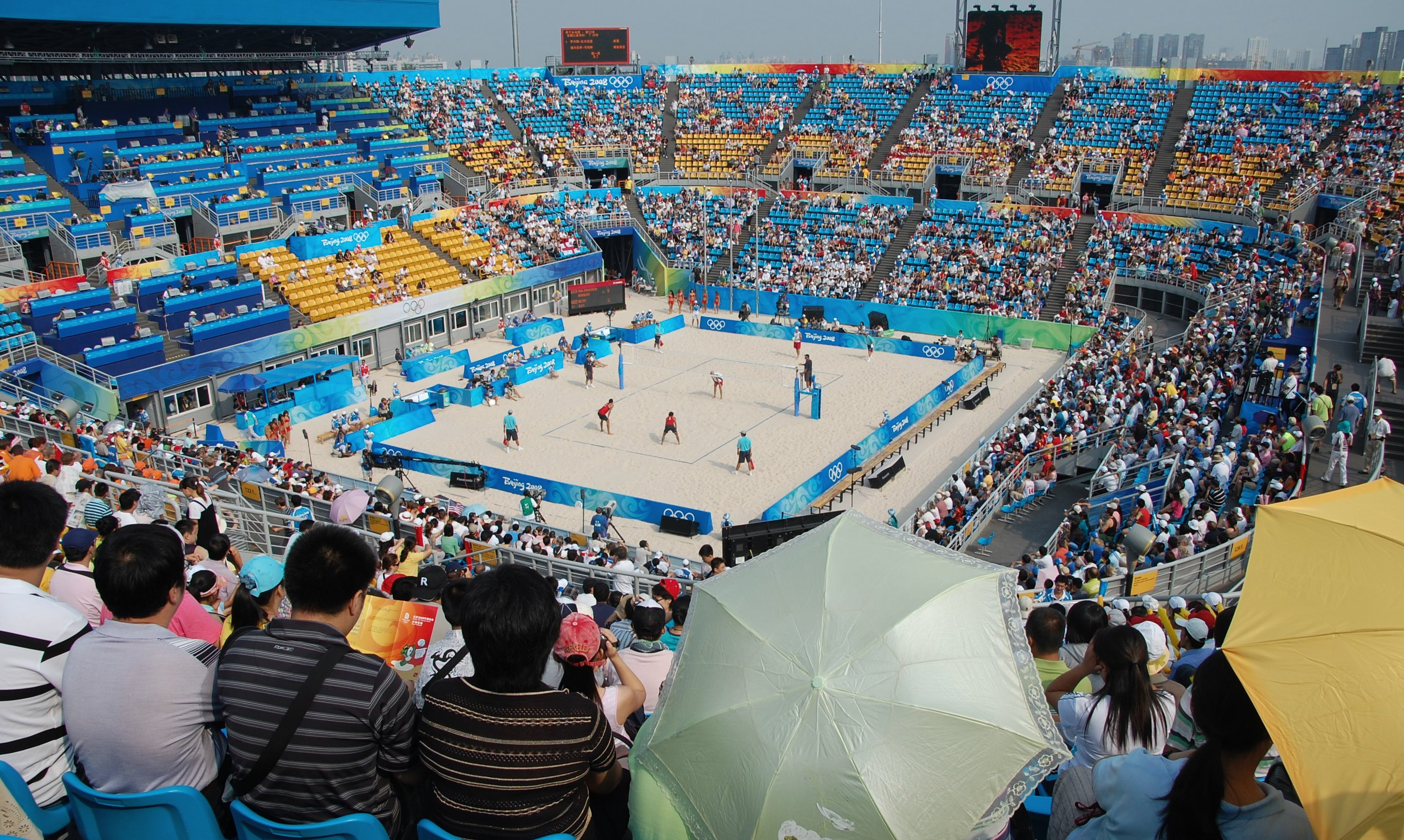
Chaoyang Park Beach Volleyball Ground hosted beach volleyball at the 2008 Summer Olympics in Beijing.

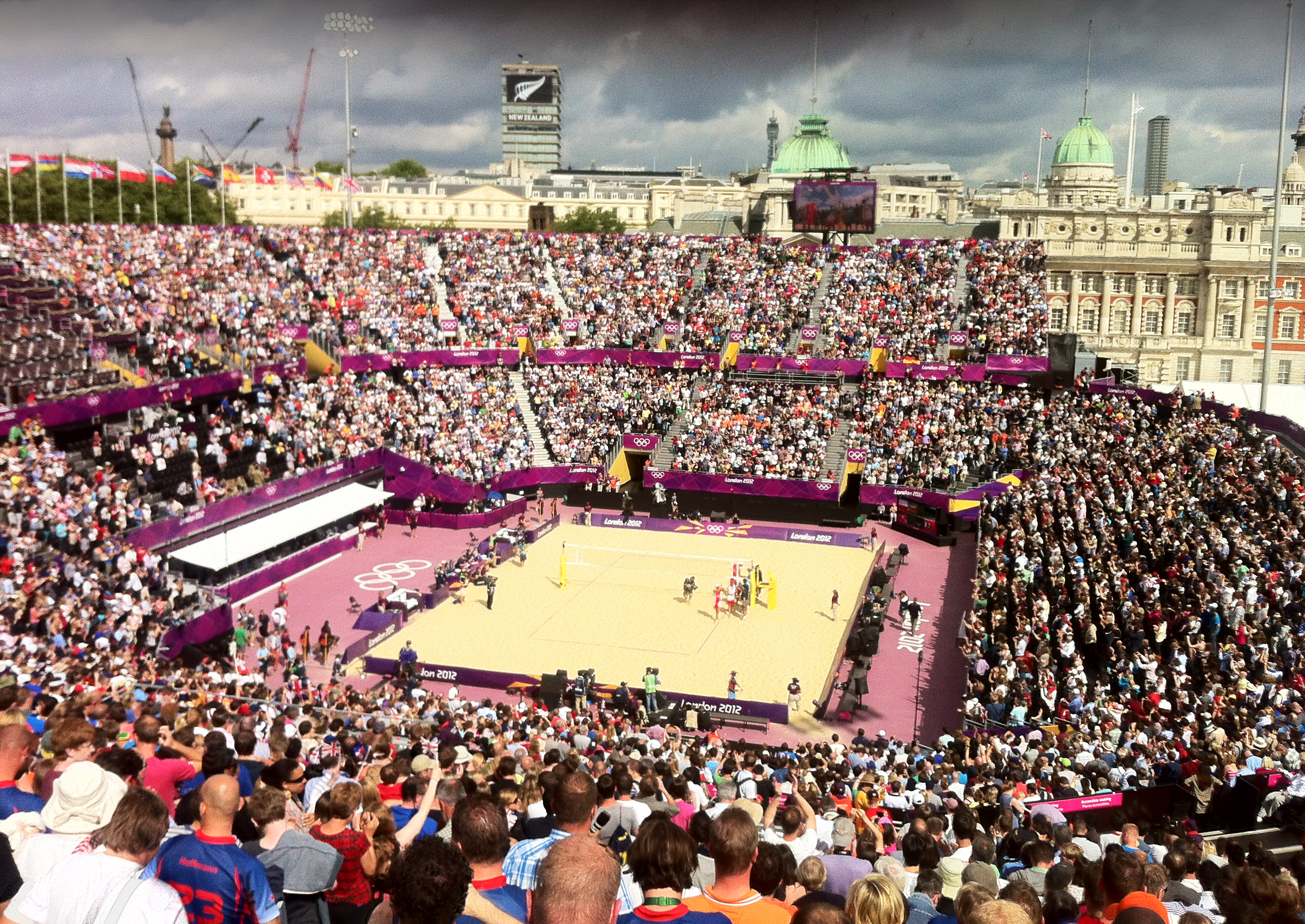
Horse Guards Parade hosted beach volleyball at the 2012 Summer Olympics in London.

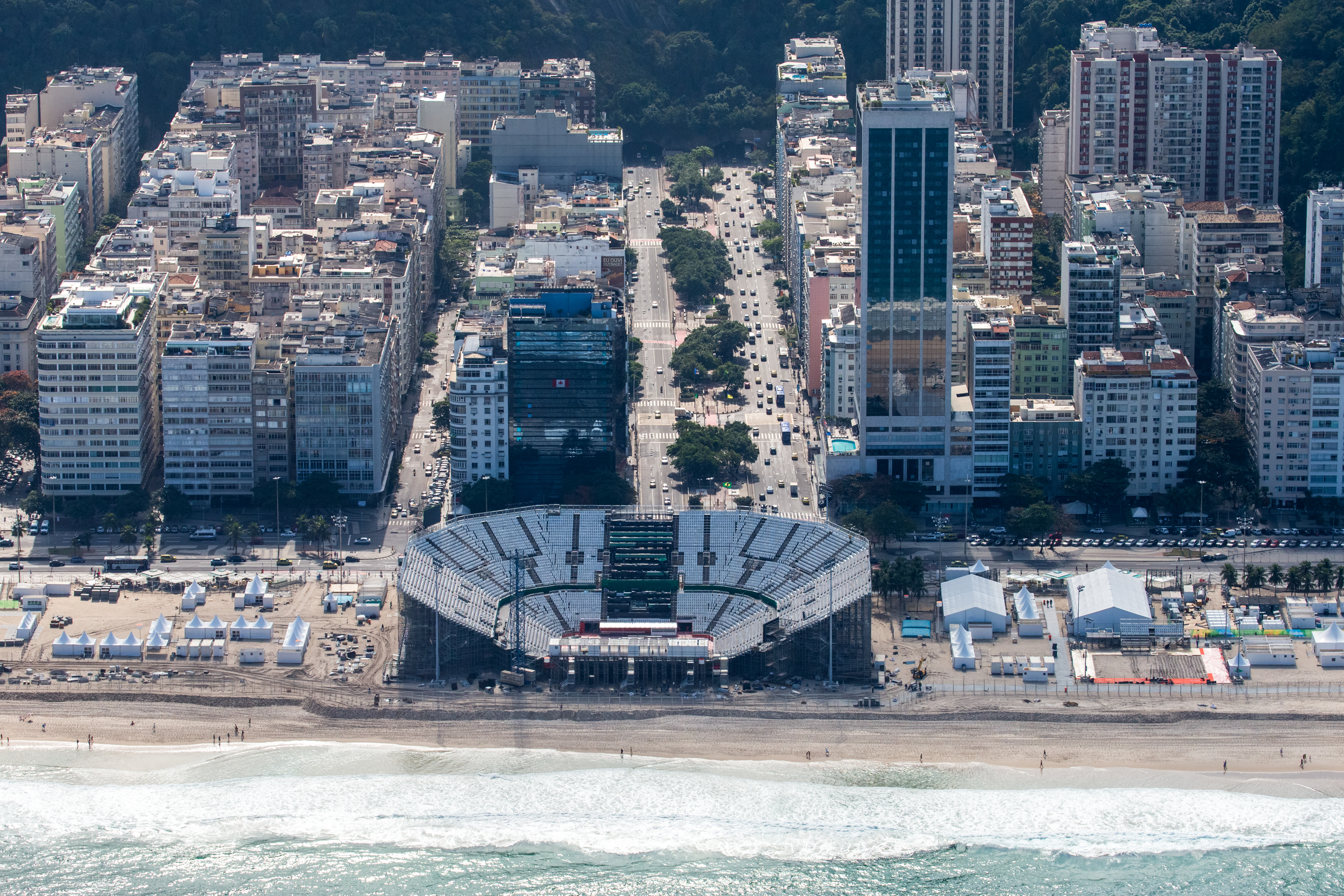
Copacabana Stadium hosted beach volleyball at the 2016 Summer Olympics in Rio de Janeiro.

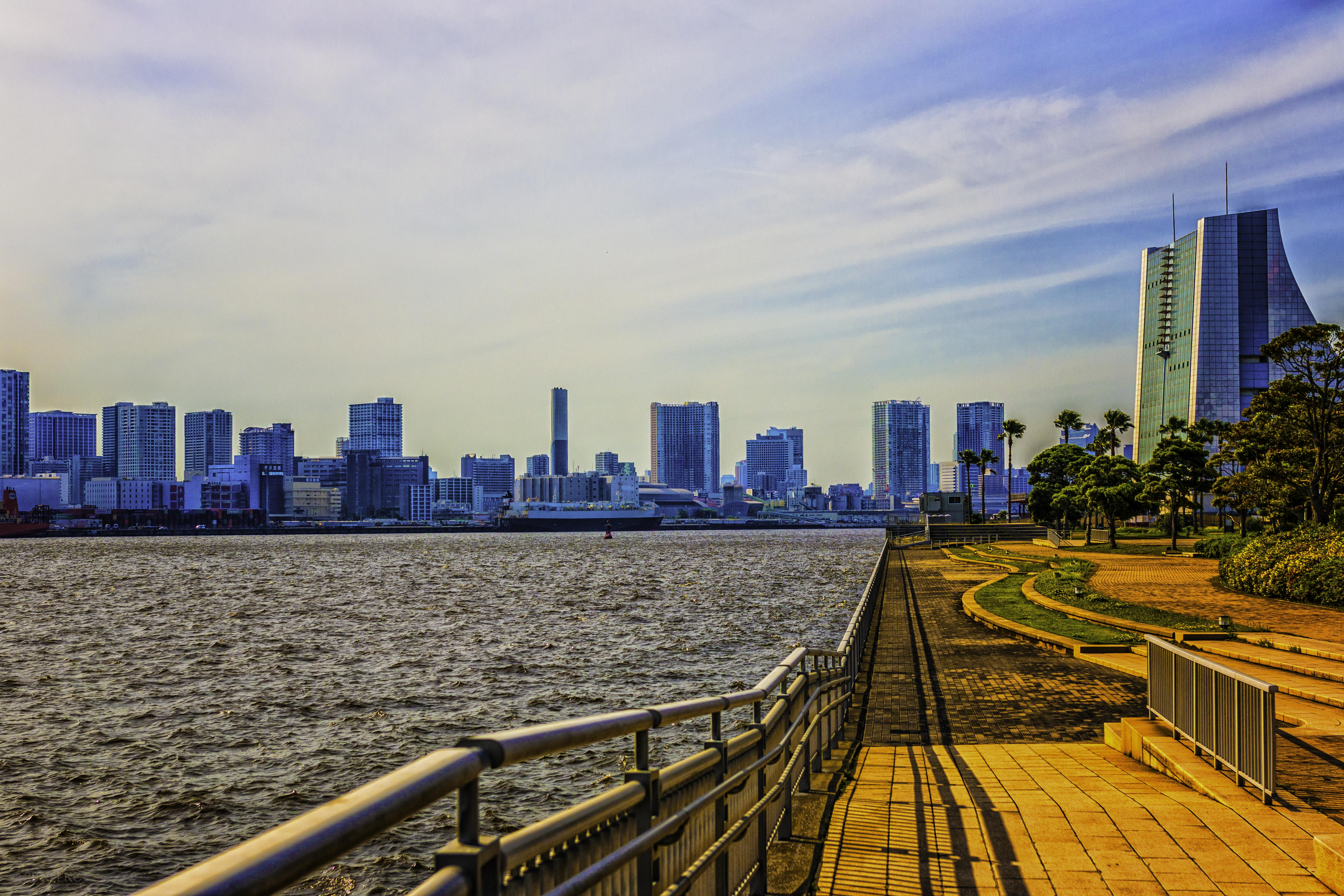
Shiokaze Park hosted beach volleyball at the 2020 Summer Olympics in Tokyo.

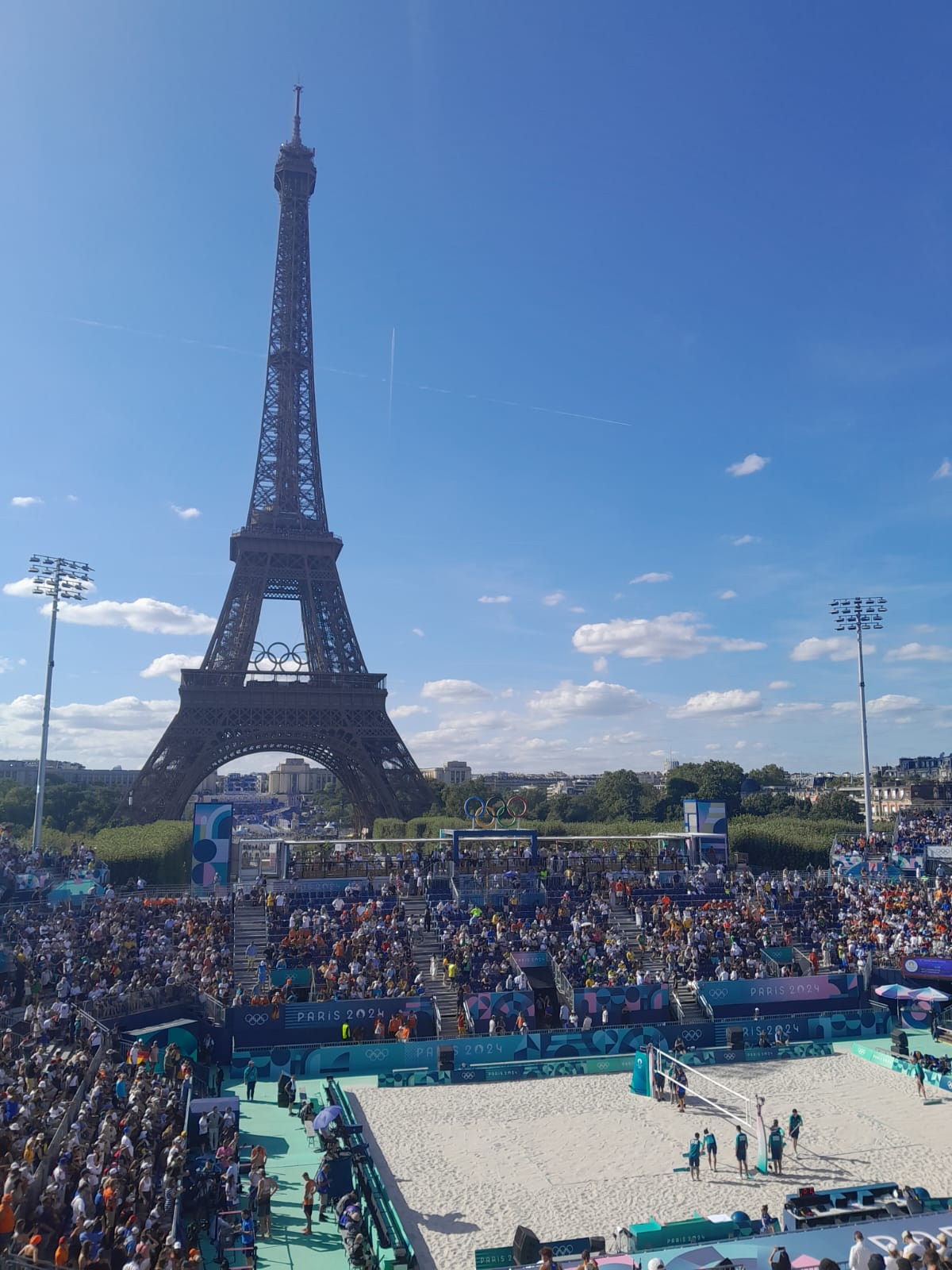
Eiffel Tower Stadium hosted beach volleyball at the 2024 Summer Olympics in Paris.

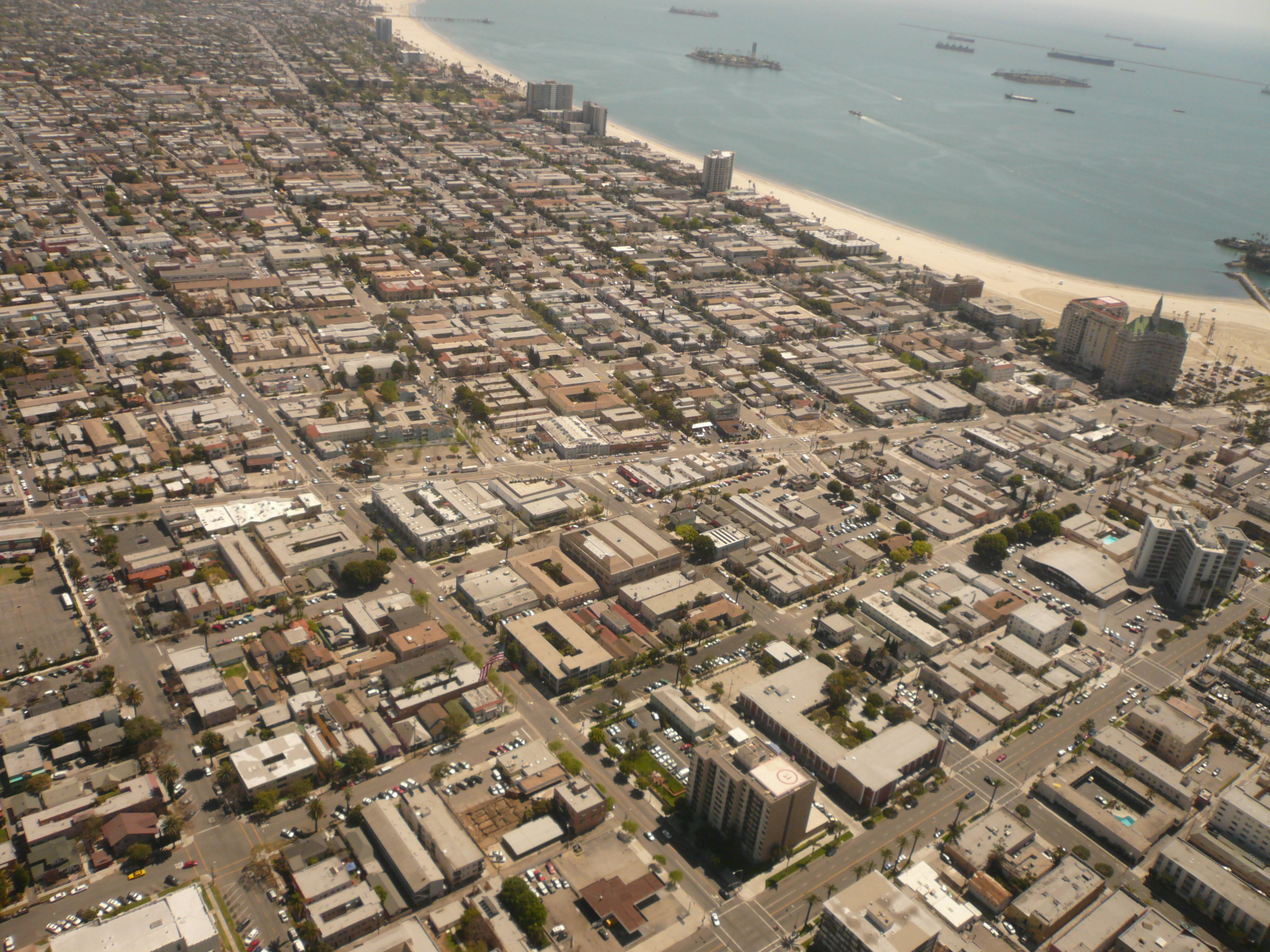
Alamitos Beach will host beach volleyball at the 2028 Summer Olympics in Los Angeles.

== See also ==
- List of Olympic venues in volleyball
