= List of Olympic venues in volleyball =

For the Summer Olympics there are 25 venues that have been or will be used for volleyball.

Games	Venue	Other sports hosted at venue for those games	Capacity	Ref.
1964 Tokyo	Komazawa Volleyball Courts	None	3,900	
1964 Tokyo	Yokohama Cultural Gymnasium (final)	None	3,800	
1968 Mexico City	Juan de la Barrera Olympic Gymnasium (final)	None	5,242	
1968 Mexico City	Juan Escutia Sports Palace	Basketball	22,370	
1968 Mexico City	Revolution Ice Rink	None	1,500	
1972 Munich	Volleyballhalle	None	3,680	
1976 Montreal	Montreal Forum (final)	Basketball (final), Boxing (final), Gymnastics, Handball (final)	18,000	
1976 Montreal	Paul Sauvé Centre	None	4,000	
1980 Moscow	Druzhba Multipurpose Arena	None	3,900	
1980 Moscow	Minor Arena of the Central Lenin Stadium (final)	None	8,700	
1984 Los Angeles	Long Beach Arena	None	12,000	
1988 Seoul	Hanyang University Gymnasium	None	8,000	
1988 Seoul	Jamsil Gymnasium (final)	Basketball	12,751	
1988 Seoul	Saemaul Sports Hall	None	4,500	
1992 Barcelona	Palau dels Esports de Barcelona	Gymnastics (rhythmic)	8,000	
1992 Barcelona	Palau Sant Jordi (final)	Gymnastics (artistic), Handball (final)	15,000	
1996 Atlanta	Omni Coliseum (final)	None	16,500	
1996 Atlanta	University of Georgia Coliseum	Gymnastics (rhythmic)	10,000	
2000 Sydney	Sydney Entertainment Centre (final)	None	11,000	
2000 Sydney	Sydney Showground Pavilion 4	None	6,000	
2004 Athens	Peace and Friendship Stadium	None	17,000	
2008 Beijing	Beijing Institute of Technology Gymnasium	None	5,000	
2008 Beijing	Capital Indoor Stadium (final)	None	18,000	
2012 London	Earls Court Exhibition Centre	None	15,000	
2016 Rio de Janeiro	Maracanãzinho	None	12,000	
2020 Tokyo	Ariake Arena	None	15,000	
2024 Paris	Paris Expo Porte de Versailles	Table tennis, handball (preliminaries), weightlifting	12,000	
2028 Los Angeles	Honda Center	None	18,000	
2032 Brisbane	Coomera Indoor Sports Centre (final)	None	11,000	
2032 Brisbane	Gold Coast Convention & Exhibition Centre	Weightlifting	6,000	

== Gallery of venues ==
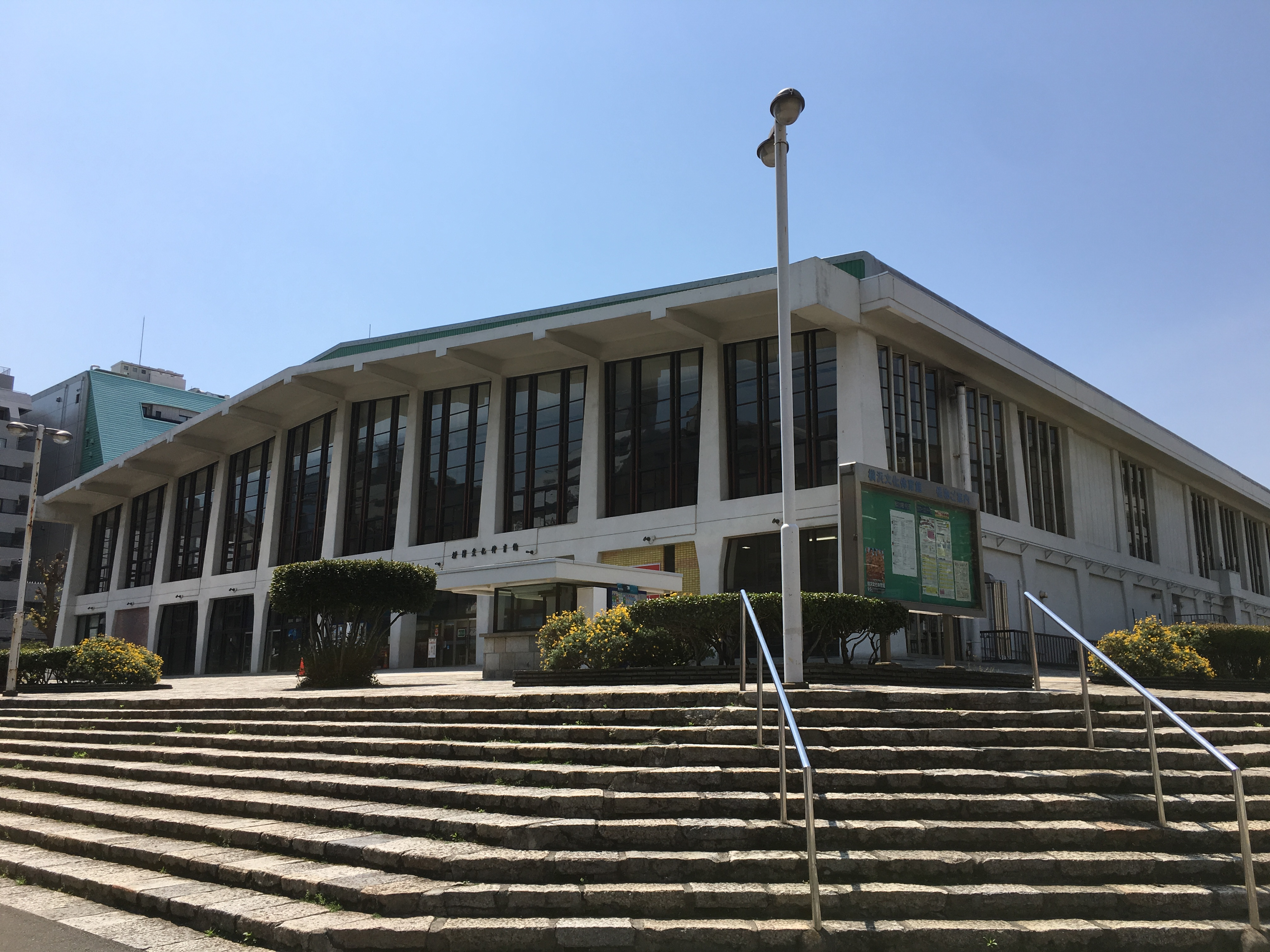
Yokohama Cultural Gymnasium hosted volleyball finals at the 1964 Summer Olympics in Tokyo.

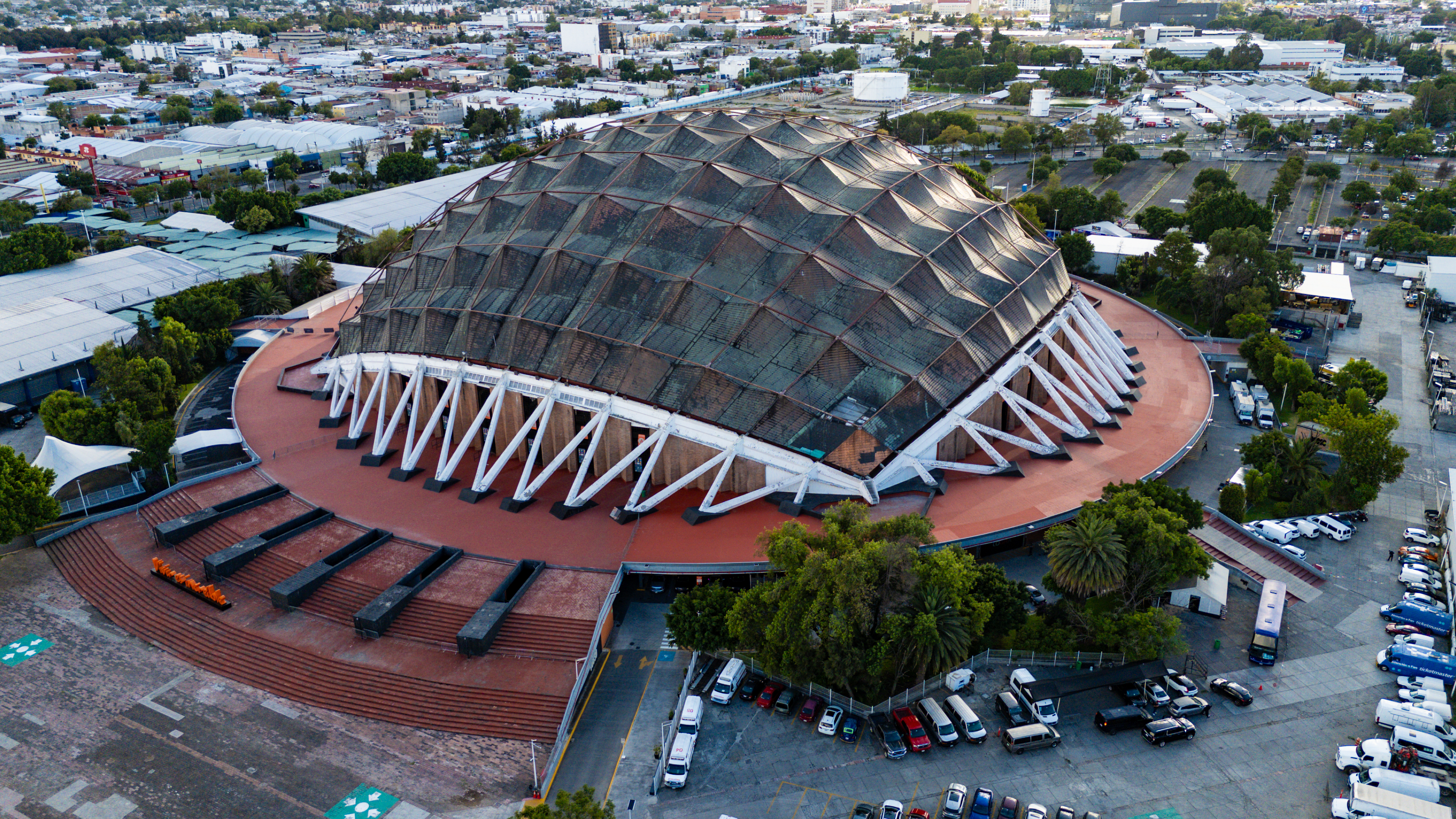
Palacio de los Deportes hosted volleyball preliminaries at the 1968 Summer Olympics in Mexico City.

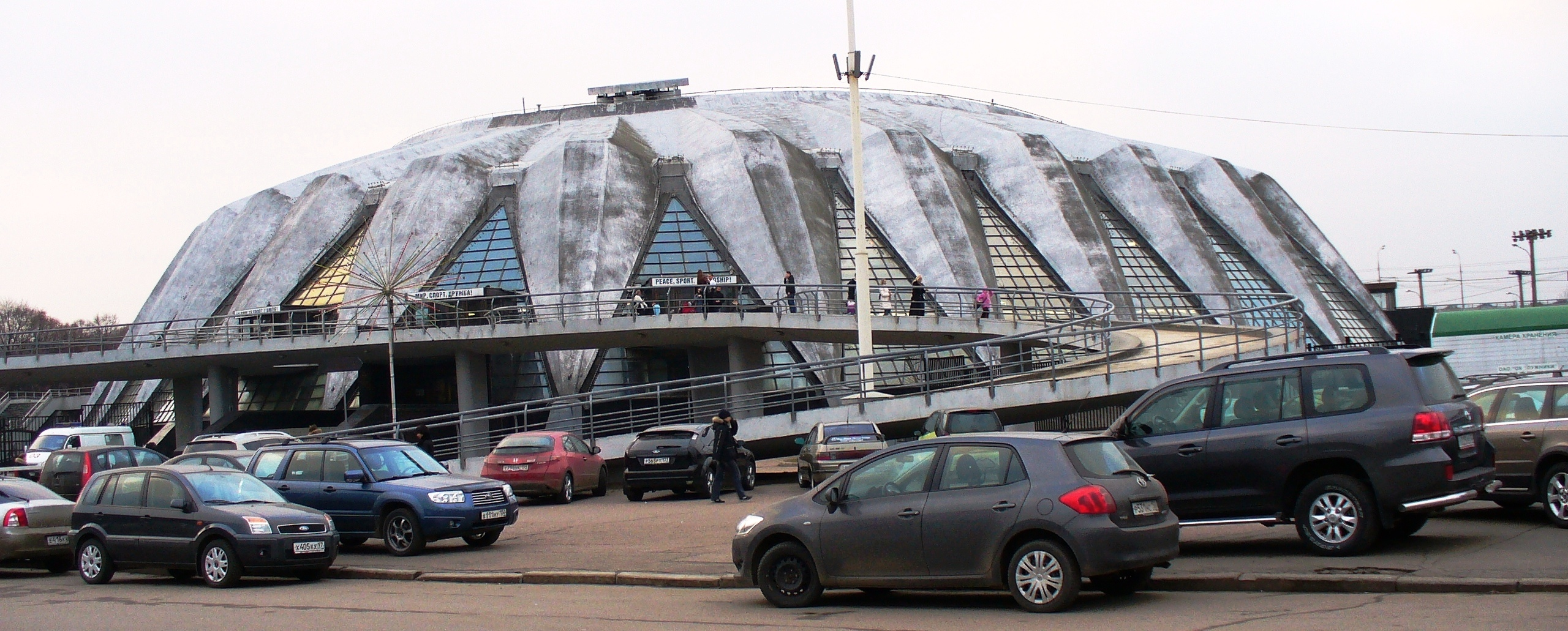
Druzhba Multipurpose Arena hosted the volleyball preliminaries at the 1980 Summer Olympics in Moscow.

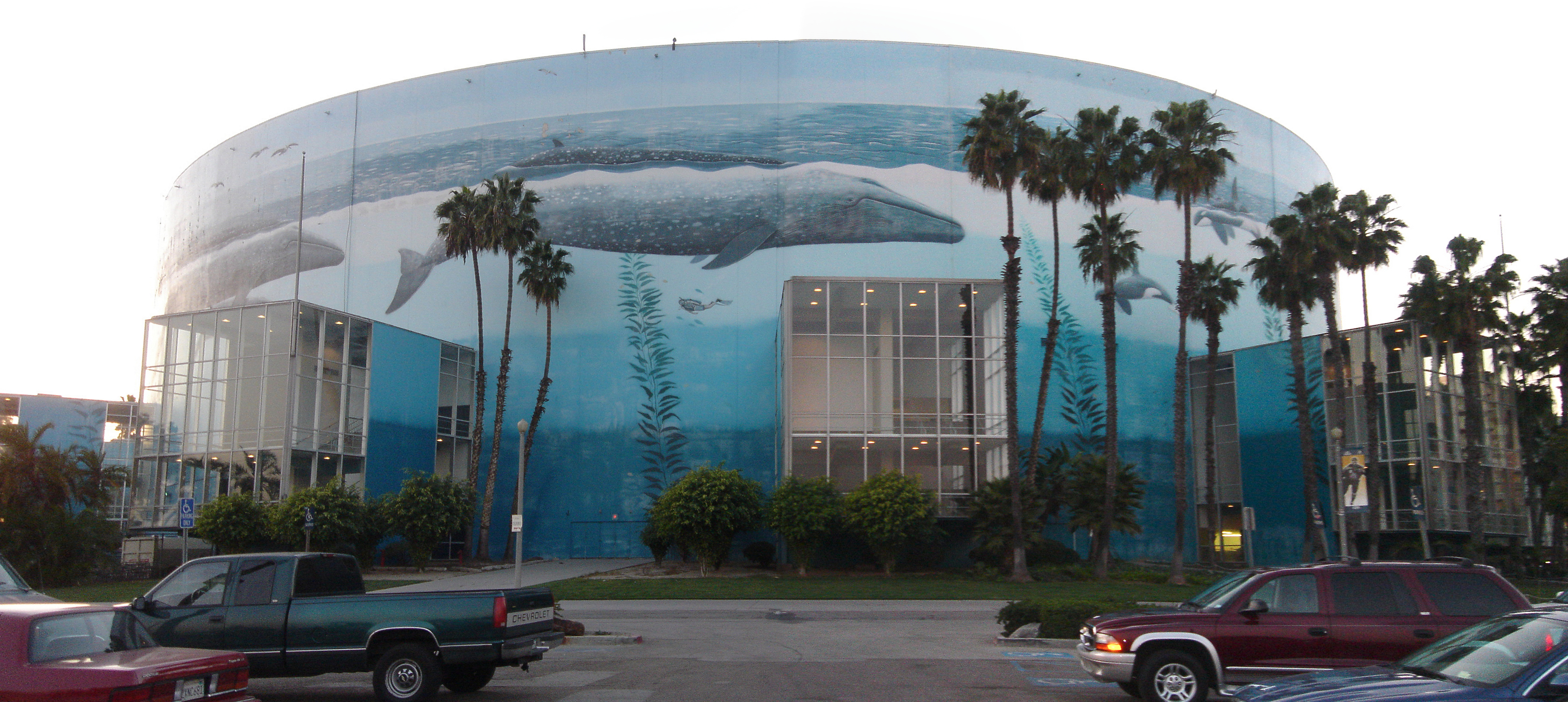
The Long Beach Arena hosted volleyball at the 1984 Summer Olympics in Los Angeles.

Jamsil Arena hosted volleyball finals at the 1988 Summer Olympics in Seoul.

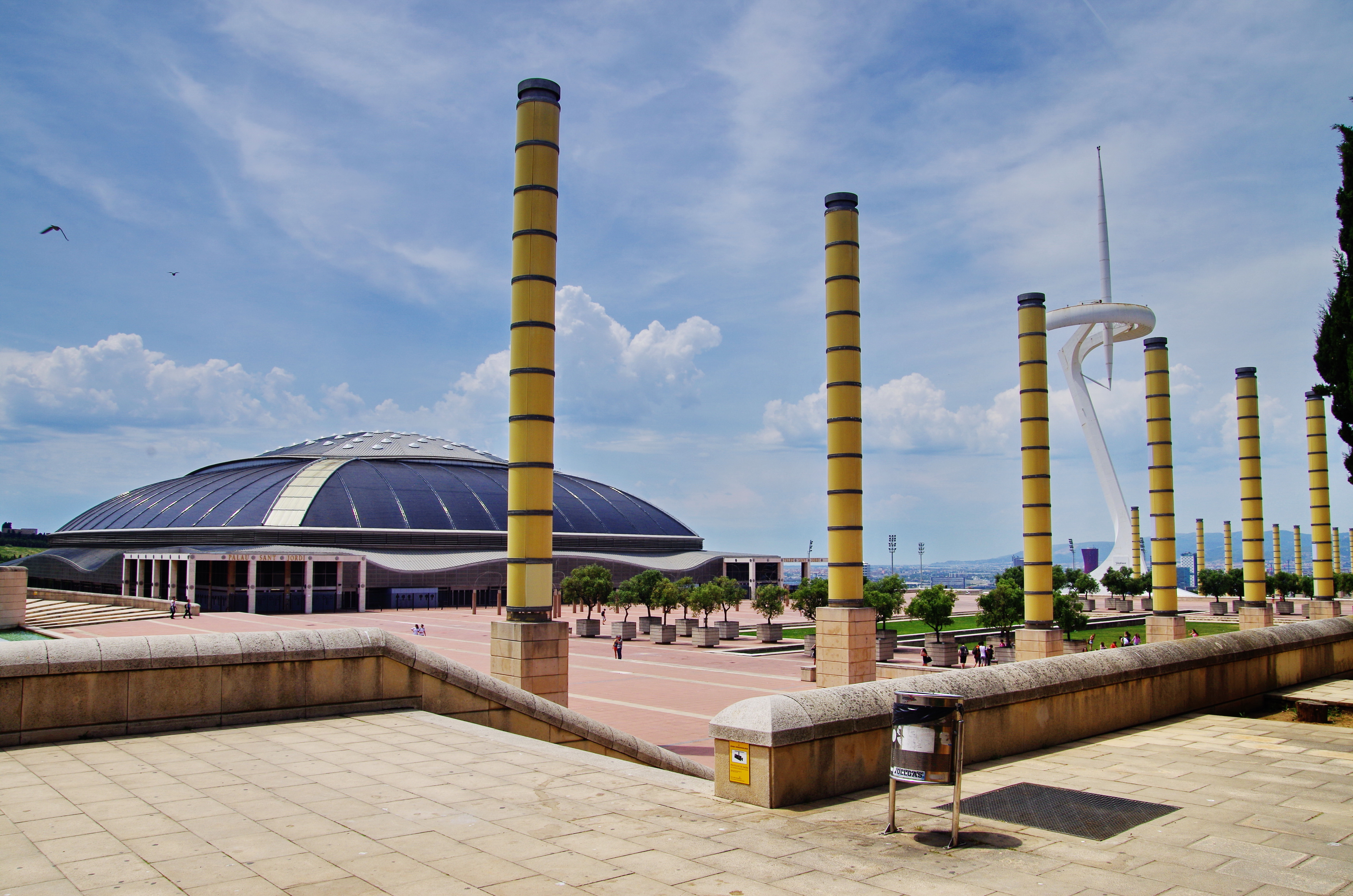
Palau Sant Jordi hosted volleyball finals at the 1992 Summer Olympics in Barcelona.

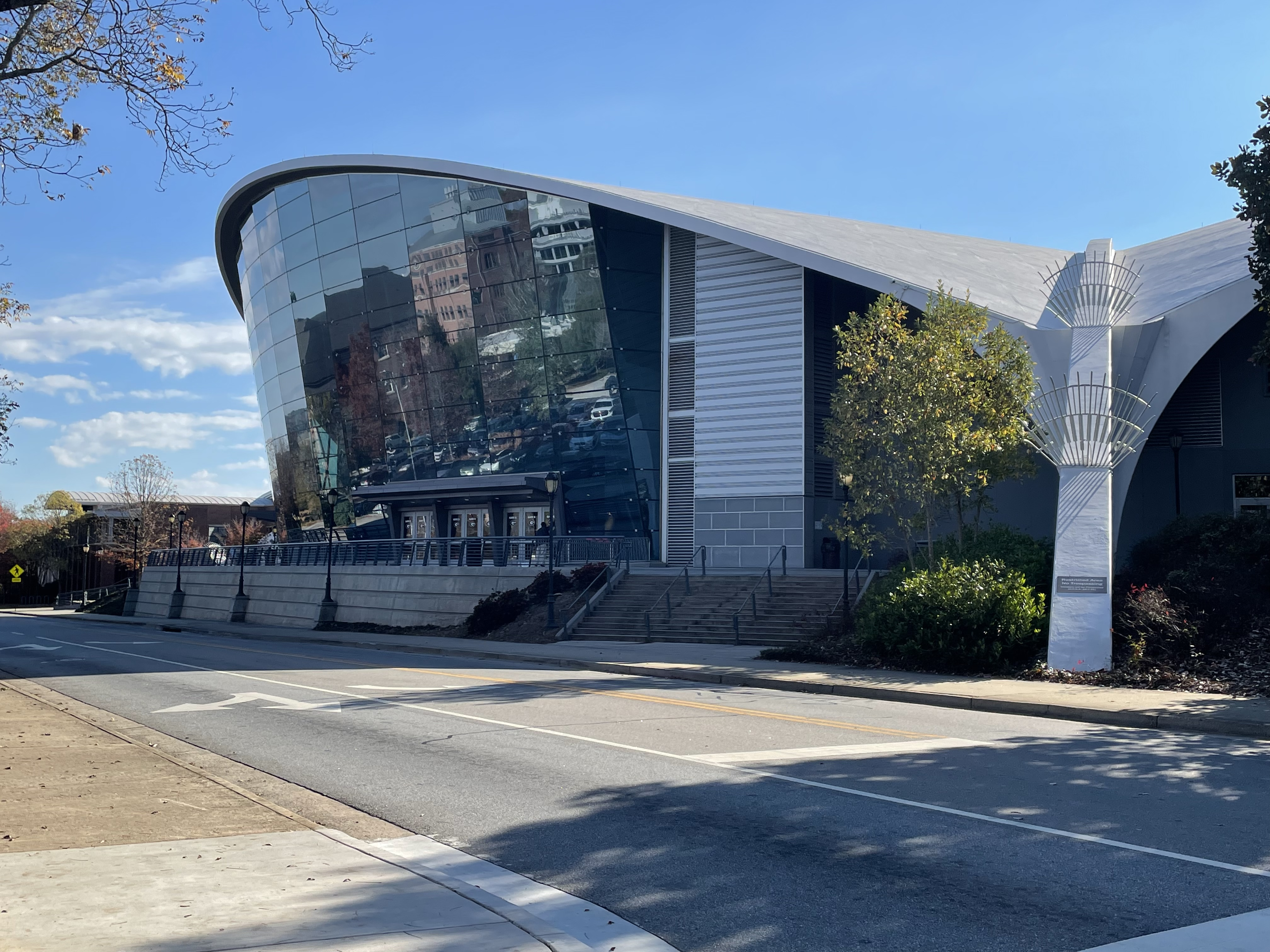
Stegeman Coliseum hosted volleyball preliminaries at the 1996 Summer Olympics in Atlanta.

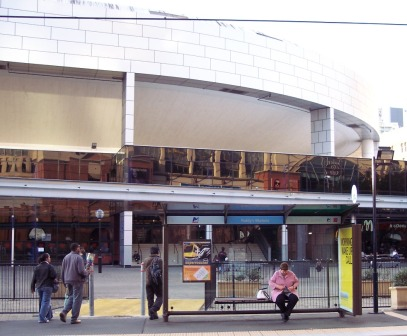
Sydney Entertainment Centre hosted the volleyball final at the 2000 Summer Olympics.

Peace and Friendship Stadium hosted volleyball at the 2004 Summer Olympics in Athens.

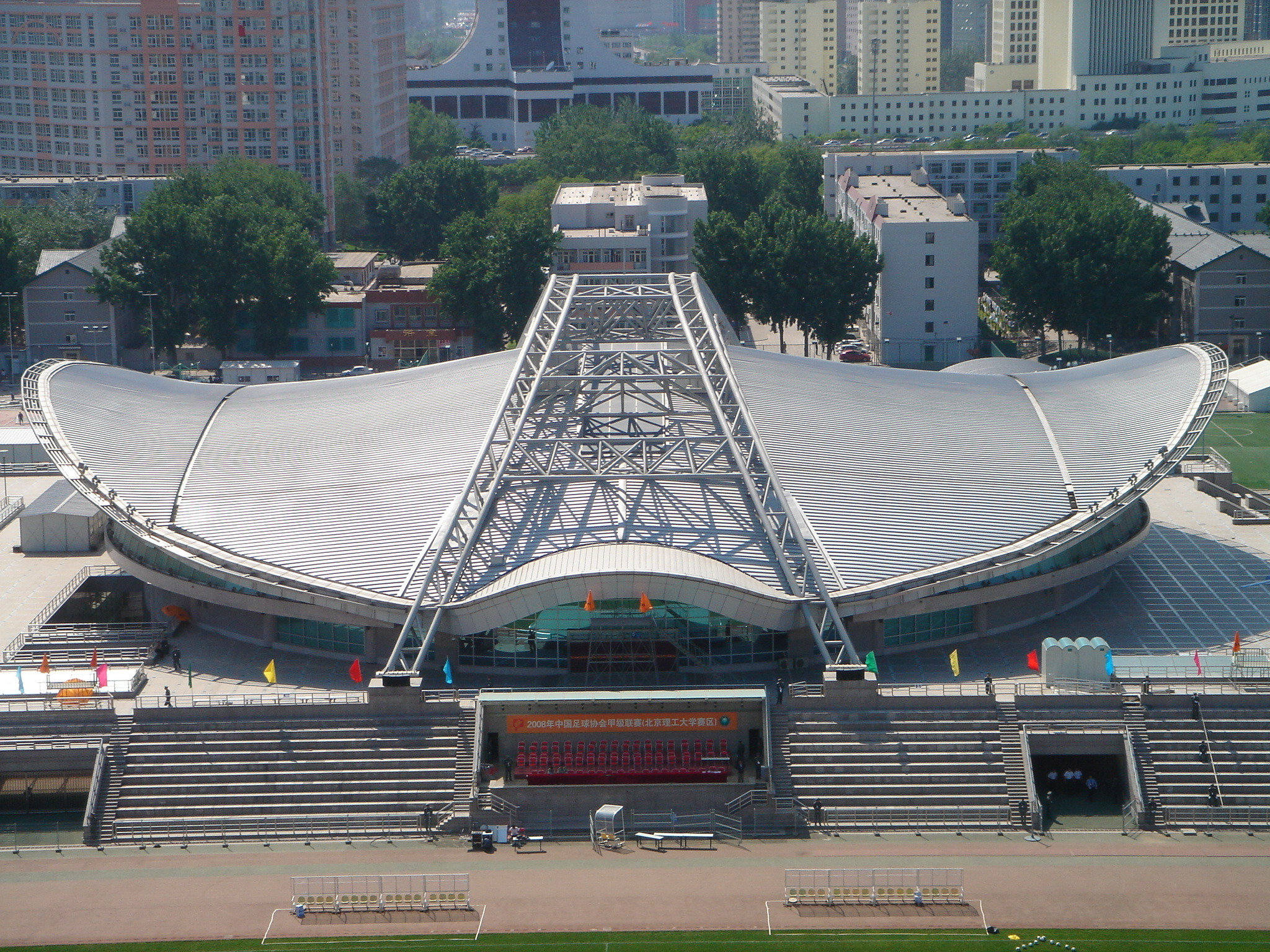
Beijing Institute of Technology Gymnasium hosted volleyball preliminaries at the 2008 Summer Olympics.

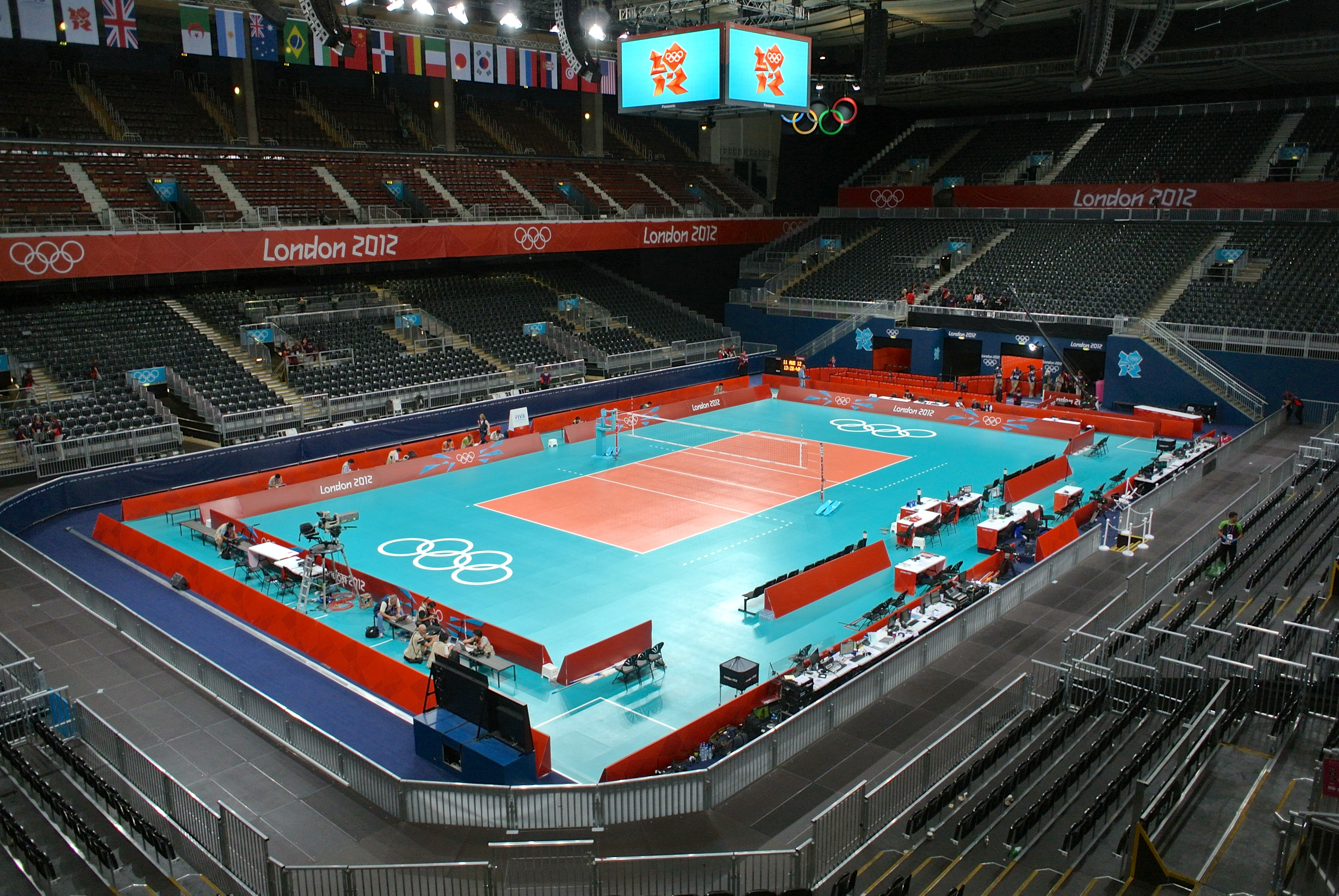
Earls Court hosted volleyball at the 2012 Summer Olympics in London.

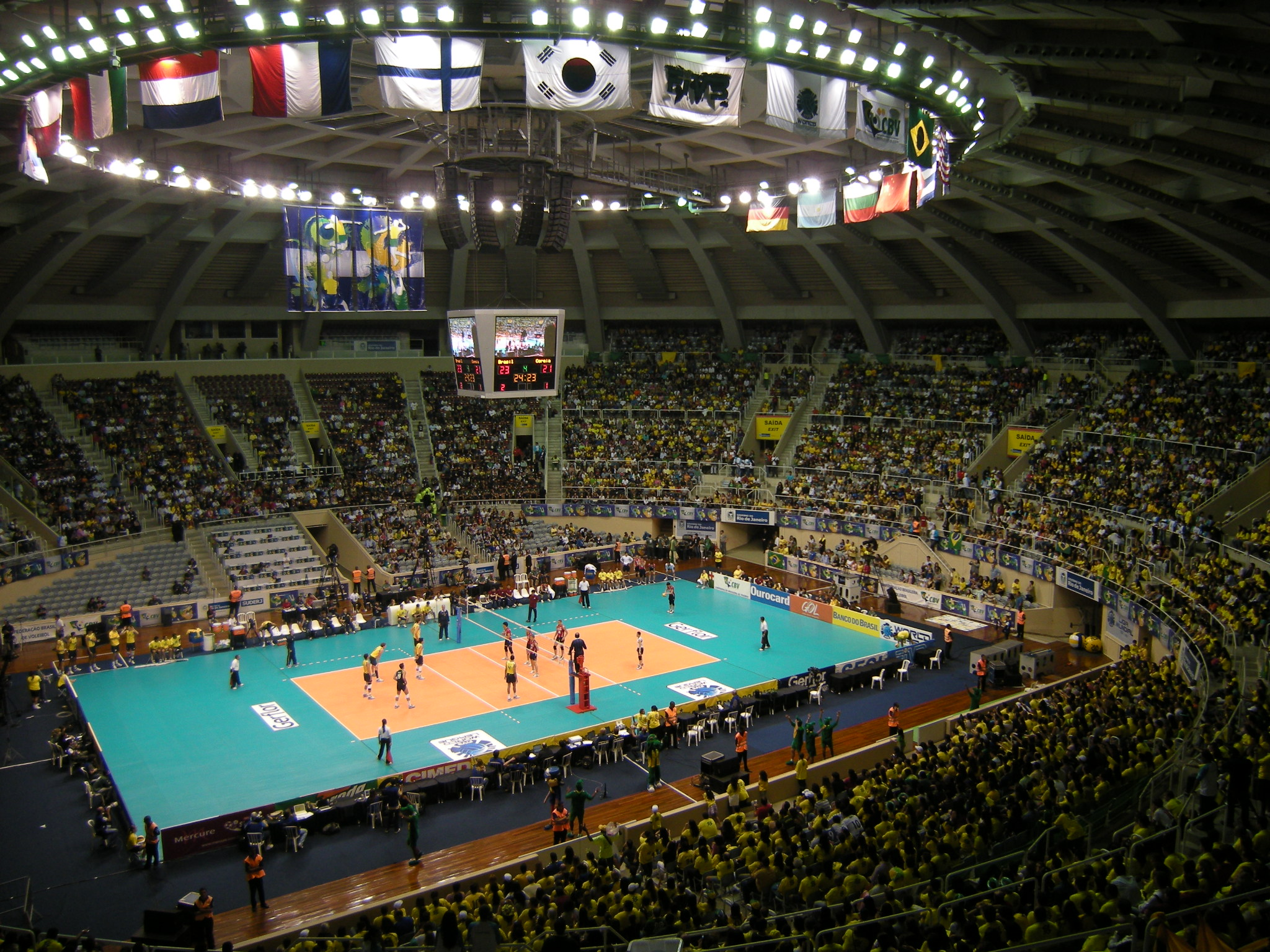
Ginásio do Maracanãzinho hosted volleyball at the 2016 Summer Olympics in Rio de Janeiro.

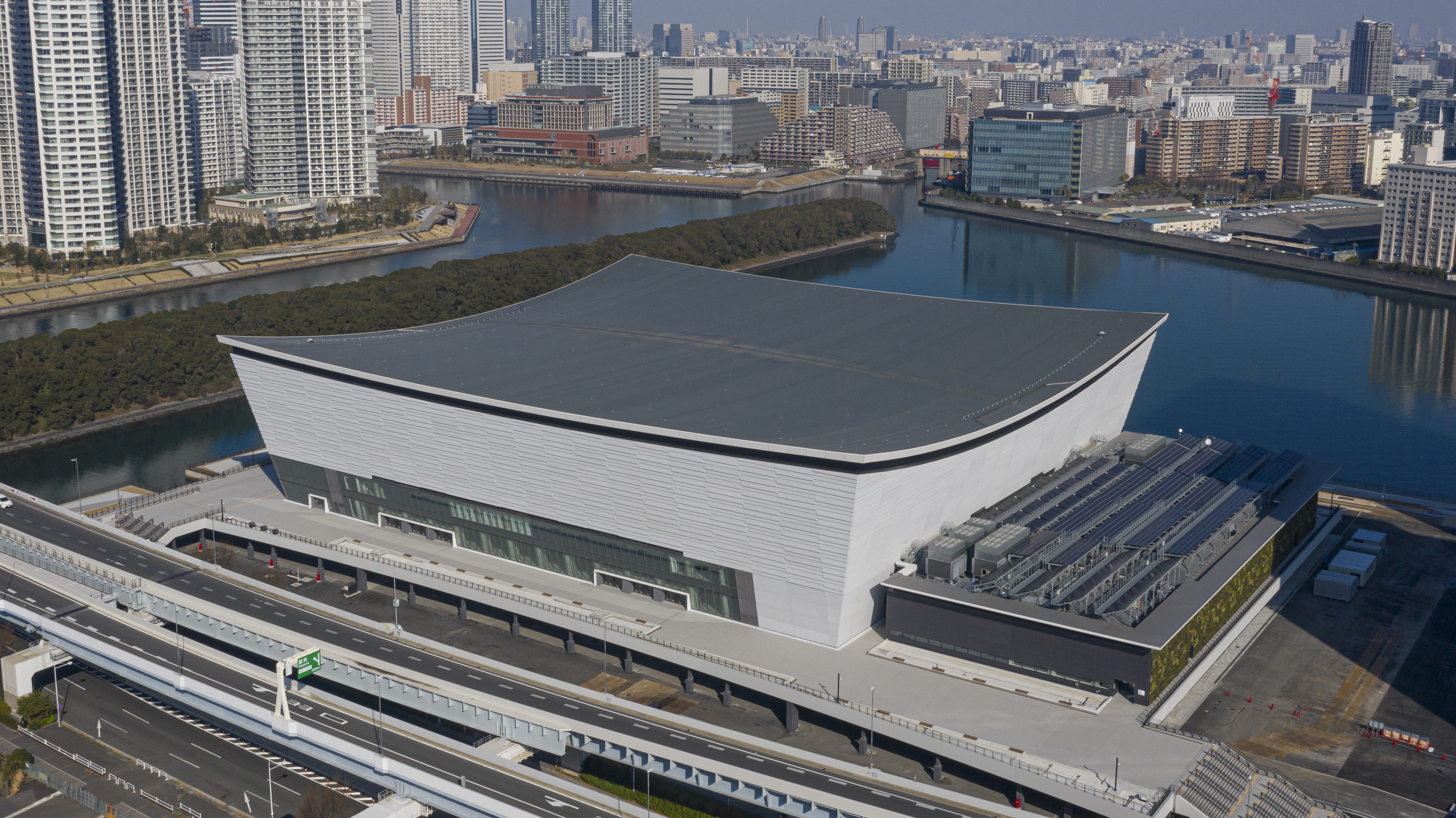
Ariake Arena hosted volleyball at the 2020 Summer Olympics in Tokyo.

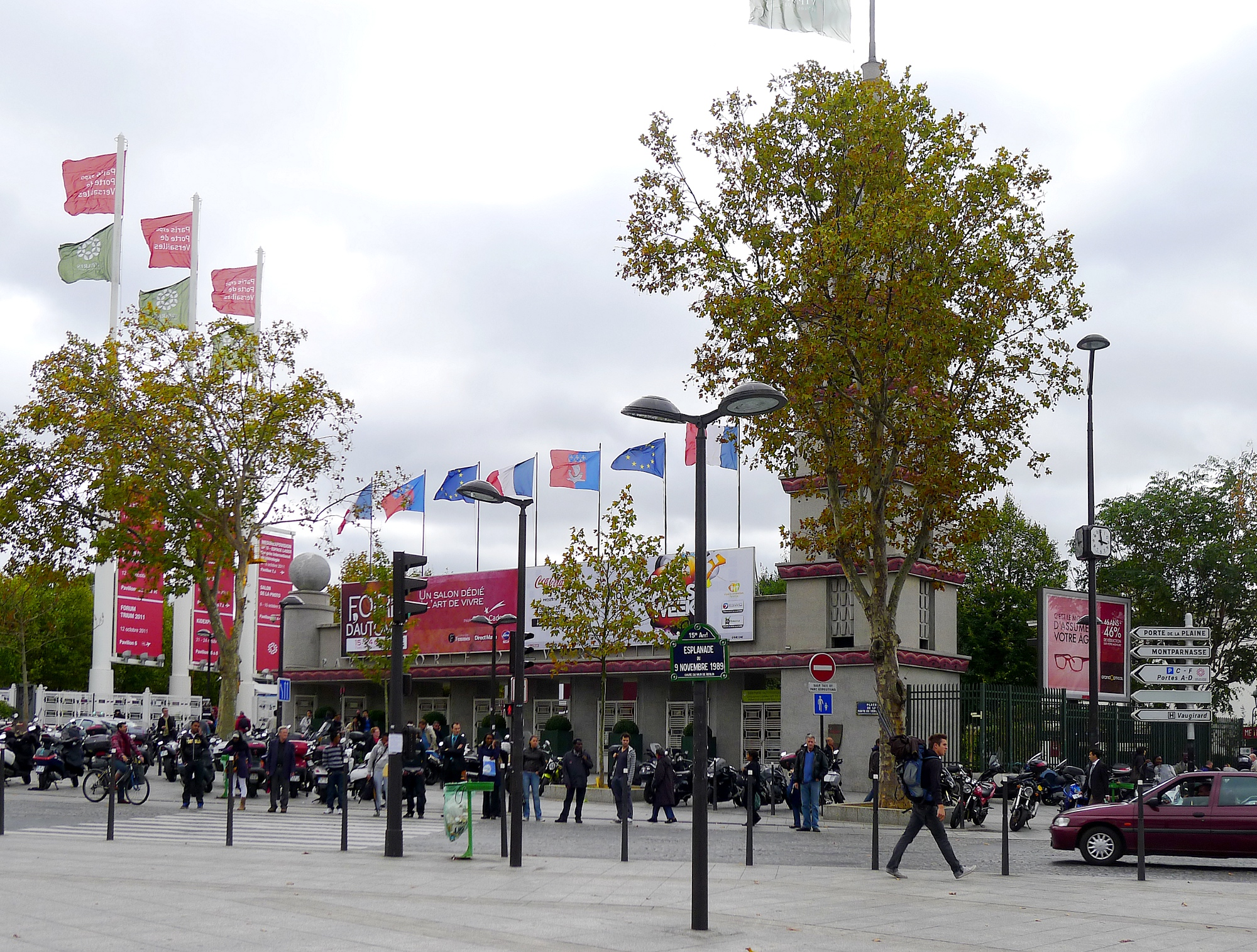
Paris Expo Porte de Versailles hosted volleyball at the 2024 Summer Olympics.

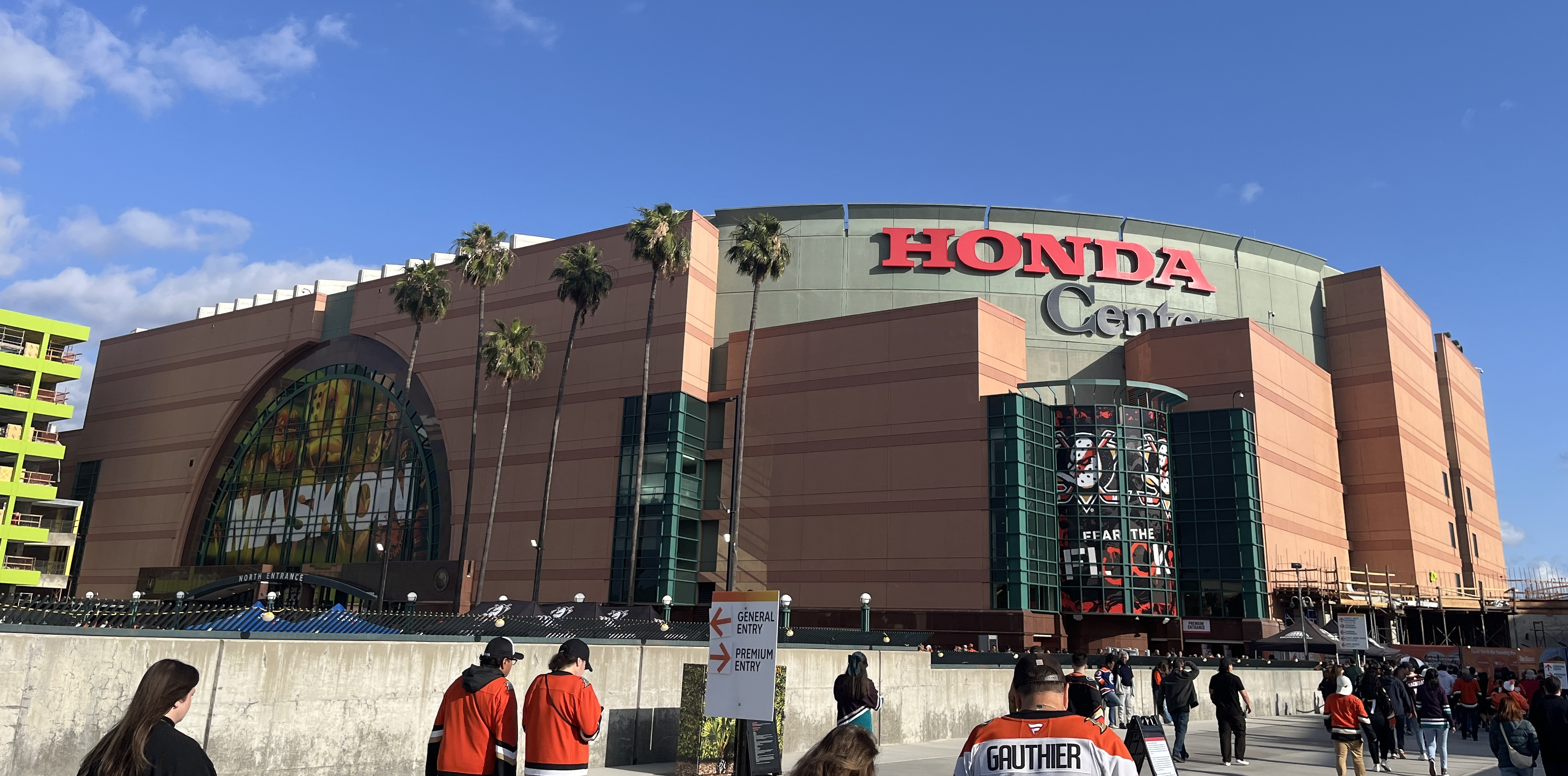
The Honda Center will host volleyball at the 2028 Summer Olympics in Los Angeles.

== See also ==
- List of Olympic venues in beach volleyball
