= Fonds Souverain dʻInvestissements Stratégiques =

Sovereign wealth fund of Senegal

The Fonds Souverain d’Investissements Stratégiques S.A. (FONSIS, English: Sovereign wealth fund for strategic investments) is a sovereign wealth fund, that manages and invests the assets of the African state of Senegal.

In July 2025, assets under management (AUM) are estimated at $1.23 billion.

== History ==
FONSIS was created by Law No. 2012-34, which was passed by the Senegalese Parliament on 27 December 2012 (“Constituent Law”). This law served as the basis for the creation of FONSIS and the drafting of the fund's articles of association as a legal entity under private law. As such, FONSIS is a limited liability company (“Société Anonyme”) with an independent board of directors and complies with the private commercial law of OHADA, the Organization for the Harmonization of Business Law in Africa, as is the case with any private company in Senegal. FONSIS is therefore established under OHADA private commercial law and the State of Senegal is its sole shareholder. As a sovereign wealth fund, FONSIS also follows standard practices by adhering to the Santiago Principles.

Similar to Gabon's FGIS, Angola's FSDEA, and Nigeria's NSIA, it is a sovereign wealth fund that combines financial and economic objectives.

In 2021, a cooperation agreement for investments in Senegal was announced with the Pan-African Afreximbank.

== Structure ==
FONSIS's main objective is to stimulate the economy and lay the foundations for a better organized, more competitive and wealthier Senegal, leading to the country's transformation by 2035. This objective shall be achieved through two main channels:

- A “strategic fund” - intended to promote private investment in Senegal and act as an anchor investor to attract domestic and foreign private investors
- A “sovereign wealth fund” - which manages surplus government funds and invests them for future generations

== Memberships ==
FONSIS is a member of:

- International Forum of Sovereign Wealth Funds (IFSWF) and the Santiago Principles
- the African Sovereign Investors Forum (ASIF)
- the African Private Equity and Venture Capital Association (AVCA)
- and the One Planet Sovereign Funds (OPSWF) initiative, which brings together sovereign wealth funds to invest in accelerating the energy transition.
