= Gabonese Strategic Investment Fund =

Manager of the Sovereign Wealth Fund of the Gabonese Republic

The Gabonese Strategic Investment Fund (French: Fonds Gabonais d’Investissements Stratégiques, FGIS) is the exclusive manager of the Sovereign Wealth Fund of the Gabonese Republic (FSRG), headquartered on Boulevard du Bord de Mer in Libreville.

FGIS has an important responsibility towards Gabonese society and pursues a long-term vision to diversify the Gabonese economy through investments in Gabon and abroad.

== History ==
The Sovereign Wealth Fund of the Gabonese Republic (FSRG) has its origins in the Fund for Future Generations (FGF), which was established in 1998. Its mission was to invest the oil revenues of the state, to enable future generations to enjoy a better quality of life. By decree of the President of the Republic, it was renamed the Sovereign Wealth Fund of the Gabonese Republic (FSRG) in 2011.

The Gabonese Strategic Investment Fund (FIGS) was established in 2012, to help Gabon develop new sources of income that generate sufficient revenue to replace those derived from oil production. It is designed to retain and manage direct investment in Gabon and support long-term investment in strategic projects. Similar to Senegal's FONSIS, Angola's FSDEA, and Nigeria's NSIA, the FGIS is a fund that combines financial and economic objectives, and its survival depends largely on its governance.

Since November 2022, FGIS has also been the sole representative for the marketing of emission allowances from the Gabonese Republic.

As of July 2025, the fund managed assets of $1.89 billion.

== Memberships ==
FGIS is a member of the International Forum of Sovereign Wealth Funds (IFSWF) and has therefore also committed itself to the Santiago Principles for appropriate conduct and proper business practices.
