= Chinwe Egwim =

Nigerian economist

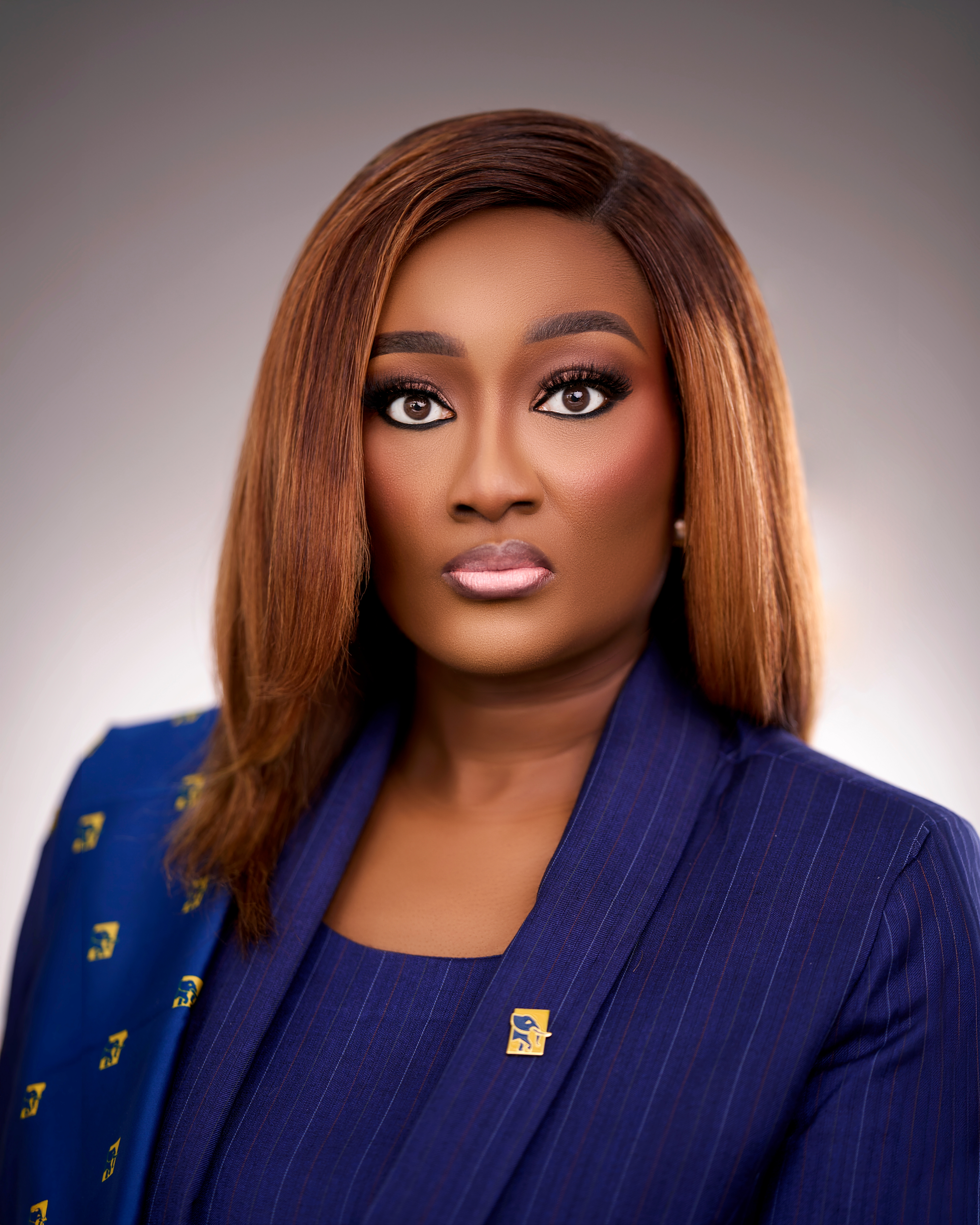
- Born: 28 October; Warri
- Education: Kwame Nkrumah University of Science and Technology; European School of Economics; Kingston University London
- Occupations: Economist; Banker; Author
- Years active: 2009–present
- Notable work: FBNQuest Merchant Bank # Lead Economist (2014–2021); World Economic Forum # Agender Contributor (2019); United Nations Economic Commission for Nigeria # National Consultant (2019); Coronation Merchant Bank # Chief Economist (2021–2016); First Bank Group # Chief Economist (2026–present)
- Title: Chief economist

Chinwe Egwim is a Nigerian economist, banker, corporate executive, and author, who is chief economist at First Bank Group, where she leads enterprise-wide economic intelligence, supports executive, and board-level decision making across the Group's multi-market operations, across its subsidiaries. She previously served as the chief economist, and head of Economic Research and Intelligence of Coronation Merchant Bank.

She has served as a National Consultant on a programme on services trade and regional integration under the United Nations Economic Commission for Africa, and the United Nations Conference on UN Trade and Development. Egwim is a member of the Presidential Fiscal Policy and Tax Reforms Committee, and served on the Board of Economists at BusinessDay Media. In 2024, Egwim was selected as a Young Global Leader by the World Economic Forum.

== Early life ==
Chinwe Egwim was born on 28 October in Warri, Delta State, Nigeria, and is from Imo State. She spent part of her early childhood in the Netherlands, where she attended the British School in the Netherlands. She later returned to Nigeria, attending Federal Government Girls' College, Owerri, and Jephthah Comprehensive Secondary School in Port Harcourt. She holds a Bachelor's degree in Economics from Kwame Nkrumah University of Science and Technology, Ghana, and a master's degree in Financial Economics from Kingston University, London. She also studied at the European School of Economics in Milan, Italy.

== Career ==
Women are vital for every nation interested in accelerating its economic and socio-economic growth. However, a level playing field across the social, economic, and political spaces will encourage increased participation of women.

— Chinwe speaking to The Spark Magazine

=== Early career: CBN, and African Positive Outlook ===
In 2009, Chinwe began her career, working at the Fiscal Division Unit within the research department at Central Bank of Nigeria, where she was exposed to the intricacies of government revenue and expenditure analysis. In 2011, she served as a research analyst at African Positive Outlook (now Helmar Care and Community Services LTD) in the United Kingdom.

=== Fitch Ratings, and FBNQuest ===
In 2013, Chinwe joined Fitch Ratings as part of the sub-National Ratings team in Milan Italy, where she analyzed economic conditions in sub-Saharan African countries, contributing to credit risk rating reports and various written outputs. Following her return to Nigeria, she joined FBNQuest Merchant Bank, and also served as the Resident Economist for Africa Investment Roundtable, a research-based initiative. In 2019, her thought leadership article focused on the interlinkage between women and Africa trade was featured on the World Economic Forum.

=== 2021–2026:Coronation Merchant Bank ===
On 28 June 2021, Coronation Merchant Bank Limited appointed Chinwe Egwim as the Chief Economist and Head of Economic Research and Intelligence at Coronation Merchant Bank. In 2023, Chinwe was appointed a member of the Presidential Fiscal Policy and Tax Reforms Committee. The committee was established by the 16th and current president of Nigeria Bola Tinubu, to review and redesign Nigeria's fiscal system for revenue mobilisation, quality of government spending, and sustainable debt management.

=== 2026-present:First Bank Group ===
On 21 May 2026, Egwim was appointed Chief Economist at First Bank Group, In this role, she leads enterprise-wide economic intelligence, supporting executive and board-level decision-making across the Group’s operations. Her work includes providing forward-looking insights that inform balance sheet positioning, liquidity management, and economic risk strategy, as well as guiding sector positioning, credit strategy, and deposit mobilisation across multiple markets.

== Public speaking ==
Chinwe has delivered speeches at many public and private summits on macroeconomics. She has been a television guest on economic programs on BBC, CNBC Africa, Arise News, and Channels TV. On 16 November 2019, during her TED talk, she spoke about equipping the female economy as a tool to driving economic prosperity for countries. This contributed to economic conversations around empowering women. In 2021, she was invited as an economic influencer by Mary Beth Leonard, where she contributed to dialogues around emerging Africa. In 2022, she was among the speakers at the 28 Nigerian Economic Summit, themed: “2023 and Beyond: Priorities for Shared Prosperity” held at the Transcorp Hilton Hotel, Abuja. In 2023, Chinwe delivered the keynote speech at the West Africa Global Trade Review Summit themed, A New Dawn: Plotting a Course for West African Trade. She also delivered the keynote speech at the 2024 100 Women in Finance Macroeconomic Outlook Event, held in Nigeria.

== Books ==
- Understanding Economic "Jargon" (2020)
- Super E: the Inflation Smackdown (2023)

== Select publications ==
- An industry in need of stitches (2016).
- State government finances: A curate’s egg (2016).
- The squeeze on consumers’ pockets (2016).
- The ugly truth: Public finances on a precipice (2017).
- Towards a business-friendly environment (2017).
- Digital economy, still scratching the surface (2018).
- Economic landscape: 2017 in review (2018).

== Awards and recognition ==
=== Awards ===
Year	Ceremony	Prize	Result
2018	The Future Awards Africa	Professional Service	Nominated
2018	HER Network	Career Woman of the Year	Won
2021	The Accenture Gender Mainstreaming Awards	Positive Role Model – West Africa	Won
2021	CIBN Awards	X-factor	Nominated

=== Recognition ===
- 2017: Inspired by Glory cited her in their #womensupportingwomen Power List.
- 2018: Leading Ladies Africa named her, as one of Nigeria's Most Influential Women.
- 2018: YNaija listed her on its Power List of most influential personalities.
- 2019: BellaNaija cited her on its list of 48 Women Who Are Champions of Nigeria's Banking Industry.
- 2020: MIPAD Under 40 in Business & Entrepreneurship – Most Influential People of African Descent.
- 2024: Selected as a Young Global Leader by the World Economic Forum.
