= Yinka Iyinolakan =

Nigerian AI entrepreneur

- Education: University of South Wales (MBA); Pan-Atlantic University (PhD researcher)
- Alma mater: University of South Wales
- Occupations: Social innovator, entrepreneur
- Employer: CDIAL
- Organization: Centre for the Digitization of Indigenous African Languages (CDIAL)
- Known for: Founder of the Centre for the Digitization of Indigenous African Languages (CDIAL)
- Title: Chief Executive, CDIAL
- Awards: Echoing Green Fellow (2023)

Yinka Iyinolakan is a Nigerian Social Innovator, and Founder of The Centre for the Digitization of Indigenous African Languages, CDIAL, a Nigerian AI startup focused on localizing digital access and digitizing native languages using language models.

He was a 2023 global fellow of Echoing Green Fellowship for emerging entrepreneurs, and former Head of strategic communications at the Nigerian Economic Summit Group.

== Career ==
He began his career as a Digital Marketing Manager with Ecobank, he later joined the Nigerian Economic Summit Group, and became Head of Corporate Communications and Advocacy for the organization. Yinka has worked for over 12 years in business of communications, technology, and design. He founded Yinola Games, a gaming, animation, and Augmented Reality platform. He is currently the Chief Executive at Cdial. He was a nominee for the Future Awards Africa Prize for Professional Services, TFAA 2019.

== Education ==
He is a PhD researcher at the Pan Atlantic University, Lagos on Computational Media and Artificial Intelligence for low-resource languages. He holds two degrees in Media and Communications, and an MBA in Business Administration from the University of South Wales, UK.
