= Laoye =

- Gender: Male
- Language: Yoruba

Origin
- Origin: Nigeria
- Meaning: The wealth of honour.
- Region of origin: Southwestern

Laoye is both a Nigerian masculine given name and surname of Yoruba origin, it means "The wealth of honor". The diminutive form is Ọláoyè with the same meaning.

== Given name ==
- Laoye Jaiyeola (born 1961), Nigerian economist

== Surname ==
- Ade Laoye, Nigerian-American actress
- Adewale Laoye, Nigerian poet
- Nikki Laoye (born 1980), Nigerian singer
- Titilayo Laoye-Tomori (born 1948), Nigerian politician
