= Jude Kofi Bucknor =

Ghanaian investment banker (born 1955)

- Born: 1955 (age 70–71); Cape Coast, Central Region, Ghana
- Citizenship: Ghanaian
- Education: University of Ghana (BSc); Columbia Business School (MBA)
- Occupations: Investment banker & private equity fund manager
- Years active: 1979–present
- Organization(s): J. Kofi Bucknor & Associates
- Board member of: Ashanti Goldfields Corporation; Ecobank Transnational Incorporated; Newmont Mining Corporation; Bank of Ghana
- Relatives: Charles Kofi Bucknor (brother)

Jude Kofi Bucknor (born 1955) is a Ghanaian investment banker. He served as managing partner of Kingdom Africa Management, a private equity fund management company, from 2003 to 2016. In 2000, he founded J. Kofi Bucknor & Associates, a corporate finance advisory firm and prop trading firm, and has served as its chief executive officer since its establishment. He is a brother of the late Ghanaian actor Charles Kofi Bucknor.

== Early life and education ==
Jude Kofi Bucknor was born in Cape Coast, in Ghana's Central Region, in 1955, the son of scientist Kobina Bucknor and Dorothy Bucknor.

He received his secondary education at St Augustine's College, Cape Coast. He subsequently obtained a Bachelor of Science in Administration from the University of Ghana, Legon in 1977. He earned a Master of Business Administration (MBA) in Finance from Columbia Business School in 1979. During his student years he worked for Northern Ireland Electricity in Belfast, Merchant Bank of Ghana, and First Boston Corporation in New York.

== Career ==
Bucknor began his professional career at Chemical Bank in New York in 1979, where he became vice president in 1981 and served as the bank's regional representative for West and Central Africa, based in Abidjan.

In 1986, he joined the African Development Bank in Abidjan as Deputy Treasurer. From 1990 to 1994, he served as Treasurer, overseeing the bank's capital market operations and treasury functions. During this period he also served as a member of the Policy Committee of the Centre for the Study of African Economies at Oxford University, and as a member of the Commonwealth Secretary-General's Special Advisory Panel on the 1997 Asian financial crisis.

In 1994, he joined Lehman Brothers International in London as executive director, Corporate Finance, with responsibility for African markets.

In 1997, Bucknor returned to Ghana as managing director of CAL Merchant Bank, a position he held until 2000. He subsequently founded J. Kofi Bucknor & Associates, a corporate finance advisory and investment firm based in Accra.

In November 2002, Bucknor was elected Chairman of the Council of the Ghana Stock Exchange for a two-year term, contributing to the development of Ghana's domestic capital markets.

In 2003, he became Managing Partner of Kingdom Zephyr Africa Management Company (KZAM), a private equity firm focused on sub-Saharan Africa. KZAM launched the US$122 million PAIP-PCAP African private equity fund, followed in 2008 by the US$492 million PAIP II fund, which wound down in 2015.

Bucknor served for six years as Chairman of Ghana's Investment Advisory Committee, a statutory body established under the Petroleum Revenue Management Act to advise the Minister of Finance on the management of the country's Heritage Fund and Stabilisation Fund.

In March 2020, President Nana Akufo-Addo appointed Bucknor as a trustee of Ghana's COVID-19 National Trust Fund, a public trust established to receive donations and channel relief to vulnerable populations during the COVID-19 pandemic in Ghana. The fund was chaired by former Chief Justice Sophia Akuffo.

== Board and advisory roles ==
Bucknor has served on the boards of numerous companies and institutions across Africa and internationally, including Ashanti Goldfields Corporation (1994–1996), Ecobank Transnational Incorporated (2003–2007), Letshego Holdings (2005–2011), National Investment Bank (2009–2012), Newmont Mining Corporation (2012–2020), Consolidated Infrastructure Group (South Africa, 2012–2020), Bank of Ghana (2017–2023), Asset and Resource Management (Nigeria), Saham Assurance (Morocco), Mixta Africa (Spain), and T. A. Holdings (Zimbabwe).

He served as chairman of the council of the University of Education, Winneba from 2004 to 2007, and has also served as chairman of Baker Hughes Oil Services in Ghana. He has been an adviser on African investments to HRH Prince Alwaleed Bin Talal of Saudi Arabia's Kingdom Holding Company. Bucknor served as a member of the International Advisory Board of Normandy Mining Corporation before the company's acquisition by Newmont Mining in 2002.

== Personal life ==
Bucknor's elder brother was Charles Kofi Bucknor (1953–2017), a prominent Ghanaian actor best known for his lead role in the film Heritage Africa (1989).
