= Onasanya =

Onasanya is a surname. Notable people with this surname include:

- Bisi Onasanya (born 1961), former Group Managing Director and Chief Executive Officer of First Bank of Nigeria
- Fiona Onasanya (born 1983), Independent politician and former Member of Parliament for Peterborough
