= GIC (sovereign wealth fund) =

Singaporean sovereign wealth fund

GIC Private Limited

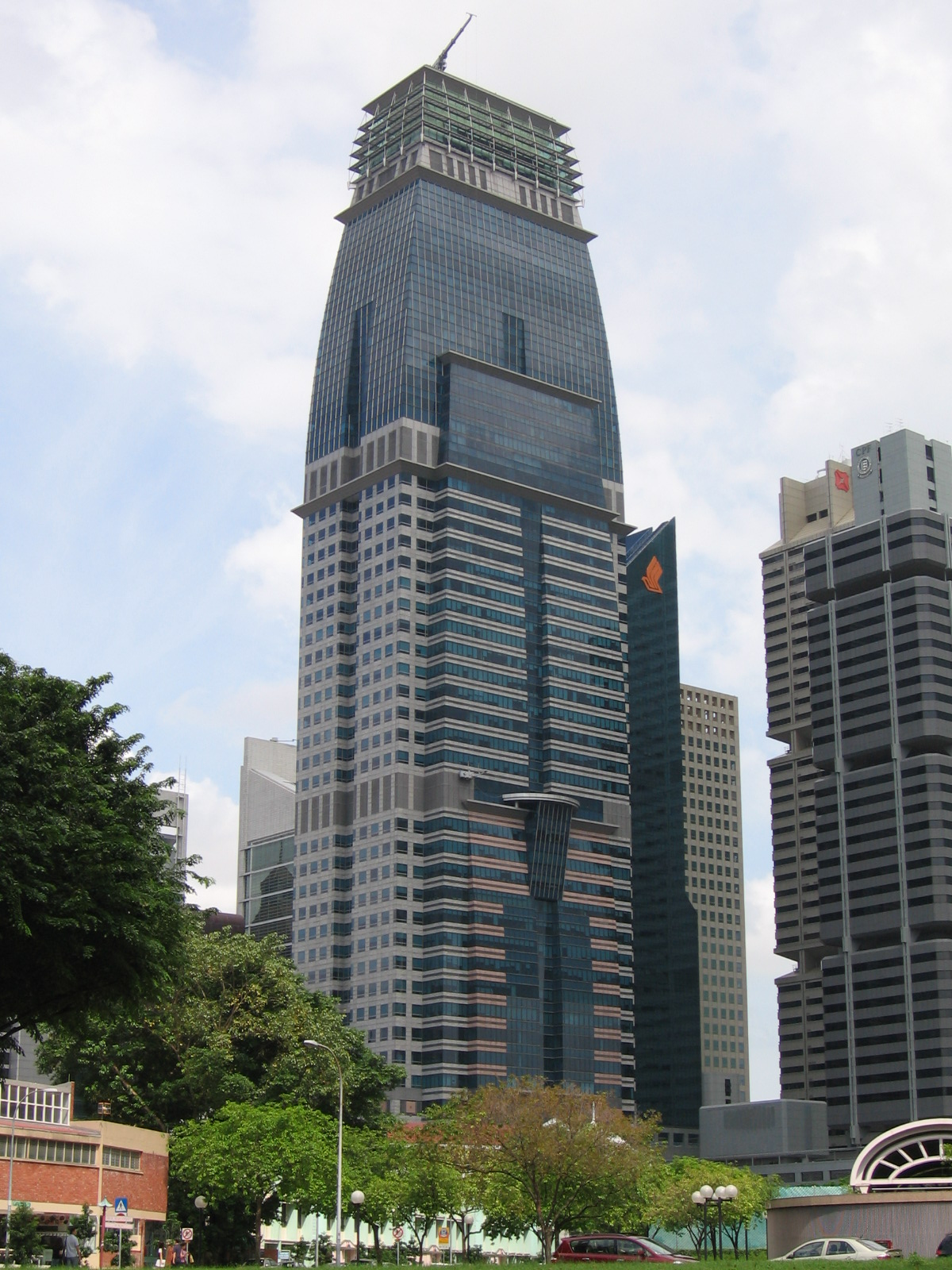
- Headquarters at Capital Tower
- Type: State-owned Pvt Ltd
- Industry: Fund management (sovereign wealth fund)
- Founded: 22 May 1981; 45 years ago
- Founder: Government of Singapore
- Headquarters: Singapore
- Key people: Lee Hsien Loong (chairman); Lawrence Wong (Deputy chairman); Lim Chow Kiat (CEO)
- AUM: ▲US$1.181 trillion (October 2026)
- Number of employees: ~1,500
- Website: www.gic.com.sg

GIC Private Limited is a Singaporean sovereign wealth fund that manages the country's foreign reserves. Established by the Government of Singapore in 1981 as Government of Singapore Investment Corporation, from which the acronym "GIC" is derived, its mission is to preserve and enhance the international purchasing power of the reserves, with an aim to achieve good long-term returns above global inflation over the investment time horizon of 20 years.

With a network of 11 offices in key financial capitals worldwide, GIC invests internationally in developed market equities, emerging market equities, fixed income, private equity, infrastructure and real estate. The Sovereign Wealth Fund Institute (SWFI) had estimated the fund's assets at US$1.181 trillion as of October 2026 while Forbes estimated the fund's assets at US$744 billion after legislation were passed to transfer about US$137 billion from the Monetary Authority of Singapore (MAS), the country's central bank and monetary authority.

Singapore's national reserves are also managed by two other entities: Temasek Holdings, with a net portfolio value of about US$568 billion as of October 2026, and the MAS, which holds a further US$428 billion.

== History ==
In 1981, Goh Keng Swee, then first Deputy Prime Minister and Chairman of the MAS, saw the trend of Singapore's rapidly growing foreign reserves and decided to invest Singapore's reserves for the future of the nation and the welfare of its people. He was advised by the British merchant bank, N M Rothschild & Sons, and established the GIC.

The government then embarked on a change in investment policy, by investing the bulk of its foreign reserves in longer-term, high-yielding assets rather than in liquid but low-yielding assets.

== Investments ==
GIC has the ability to invest across a full spectrum of financial assets, from sovereign debt to infrastructure, and manages approximately 80 per cent of its portfolio in-house.

Traditionally, GIC keeps a high profile in its investments. During the subprime mortgage crisis of 2007–2010, however, a number of its investments attracted controversy. In 2013, according to the Sovereign Wealth Fund Institute, the GIC was one of the most active sovereign wealth fund investors for the year.

On 30 July 2013, Singapore's GIC was part of a consortium to acquire Transport et Infrastructures Gaz France (TIGF) which is Total's gas transportation and storage business for an enterprise value of €2.4 billion (US$3.25 billion). The consortium includes Snam (45%) an Italian gas storage and transport operator, Singapore's GIC (35%) and EDF (20%).

As of 2017, GIC holds around 34% of its portfolio in the US; 3% in Latin America; 6% in the rest of Americas; 6% in the United Kingdom; 12% in the Eurozone; 6% in the Middle East, Africa and the rest of Europe; 19% in Asia excluding Japan; 12% in Japan and 2% in Australasia.

In January 2019, GIC purchased a 2.55% stake in Vietcombank for $265 million. The fund also participated in a $300 million funding round for German fintech company N26, a year later, GIC participated in a $650 million financing round for Klarna, and took part in Kotak Mahindra Bank's sale of shares worth $1 billion. In September 2020, GIC and MassMutual acquired Blackstone's 36% share in Rothesay Life for $2.69 billion, increasing both of their stake to 49%.

In 2021, they took part in an investment round in Dapper Labs.

GIC became a minority shareholder when it invested into Brazilian pharmaceutical company Cimed in March 2025.

=== Real estate ===
In 2006, at the height of the US real estate bubble, it made a US$200 million investment in the equity of Stuyvesant Town–Peter Cooper Village, the largest apartment complex in Manhattan (as well as US$575 million in secondary loans). The management of the complex, Tishman Speyer Properties and BlackRock Realty, defaulted on their loan in 2010, effectively wiping out the investment.

=== Financial institutions ===
In late 2007, during the first phase of the crisis, GIC invested $11 billion Swiss francs for a 7.9% stake in the Swiss bank UBS. The loans were converted into equity in 2010, with an estimated 70% loss of value, though partially offset by a 9% fixed coupon. GIC had acknowledged that the timing for the investment could have been better. It also stated that other investments made at that time have had positive returns which offset the losses on UBS. GIC's total portfolio has fully recovered to its value prior to the 2008 financial crisis.

In 2008, GIC invested US$6.88 billion for a 9% stake in Citigroup. In 2009, it pared its stake to less than 5%, realising a $1.6 billion profit, with another $1.6 billion paper profit on its remaining holding.

In September 2012, GIC increased its stake in the China Pacific Insurance Group from 2.3% to 10.61% for $700 million. In 2014, GIC led a $150 million funding round into payment processing company Square. In March 2017 GIC acquired Allfunds Bank together with Hellman & Friedman for €1.8 billion. In the same year, it was reported that GIC would purchase a 10% stake in British specialist bank OakNorth for £90 million and that the fund reduced its holding in UBS from 5.1% to 2.7%.

In December 2023, GIC acquired Cinven's shares in Miller and became the majority shareholder of the UK specialist insurance and reinsurance broker. In 2024, the fund participated in a share sale of Monzo, valuing the company at $5.9 billion. In May 2025, GIC invested into Citco.

== Performance ==
In 2008, GIC published for the first time a report containing information on its 20-year returns and more information on how it is managed and governed, and how it invests Singapore's foreign reserves.

GIC does not disclose the amount of funds it manages and its annual profit and loss. Revealing the exact amount would expose the full size of Singapore's financial reserves and make it easier for speculators to attack the Singapore dollar during periods of vulnerability.

Since 2011, GIC had also published the 5-year and 10-year nominal rates of return to provide a sense of the ongoing medium-term investment performance, even while GIC maintains its sights on the long term. It included two composite portfolios and volatility statistics to reflect the level of portfolio risk and to offer perspective in reading the 5-year and 10-year figures.

For the year ended 31 March 2017, its annualised 20-year real rate of return was 3.7%. In USD nominal terms, GIC achieved an annualised return of 5.1%, 4.3% and 5.7% for the 5-year, 10-year and 20-year time periods respectively.

In August 2021, their estimates also put the total figure of AUM at US$744 billion – or just over S$1 trillion, for the first time in GIC's history after a 37.5 per cents in return.

== Governance and risk management ==
The funds managed by GIC are owned by the Singapore Government. Its investment returns supplement the country's annual budget in areas such as education, R&D, healthcare, and infrastructure.

As a Fifth Schedule company under the Singapore Constitution, GIC is accountable in various key areas to the President of Singapore who is empowered under the Constitution to obtain information to enable him or her to safeguard the country's reserves. The Auditor-General, who is appointed by the President of Singapore, submits an annual report to the President and Parliament on his or her audit of the Government and other entities managing public funds.

GIC manages risk by investing in a well-diversified portfolio, with a balanced distribution of asset classes and their underlying business sectors and geographies. This is also why GIC's performance has to be measured on the basis of its overall portfolio rather than by how much it makes or loses on individual investments. Its approach to "risk management" has three distinct components: portfolio risk; process risk; and people risk.

As a board member of the International Forum of Sovereign Wealth Funds, the successor of the International Working Group of SWFs that developed the Santiago Principles in October 2008, GIC publishes how it adopts and implements the voluntary set of principles and practices.

== New investment framework ==
GIC implemented a new investment framework in 2013 to give it more flexibility to focus on "investments that may be riskier in the short term but would generate returns in the long-term".

The new framework defines more clearly GIC's risk and return drivers, its long-term investment objectives and the responsibilities of the GIC board and management.

Firstly, a 'Reference Portfolio is 65% made up of global equities and 35% of global bonds representing global markets. It characterises the risk that the Government is prepared for GIC to take in its long-term investment strategies. Next, the Policy Portfolio is made up of six core asset classes and aims to achieve superior returns over the long horizon and is the main driver of long-term returns. Last is the Active Portfolio, which seeks to outperform the Policy Portfolio, is of skill-based strategies, adopted by GIC's management within risk limits. The skill-based strategies includes choosing investment opportunities within each asset class and investing in asset classes not contained in the simplified Policy Portfolio and cross-asset class strategies.
