= ISIF =

ISIF may refer to:

- Industrial Society and Its Future
- Ireland Strategic Investment Fund
