= Adesola =

Adesola is a Nigerian name that may refer to

Given name

- Adesola Kazeem Adeduntan (born 1969), Nigerian business executive
- Adesola Nunayon Amosu (born 1958), Nigerian Nigerian Air Force Air vice-marshal
- Adesola Osakalumi, American actor, dancer, choreographer

Surname

- Akinpelu Oludele Adesola (1927–2010), Nigerian surgeon
