= Ghana COVID-19 National Trust Fund =

- Covid-19 National Trust Fund
- Members: Former Chief Justice, Sophia Akuffo, Archbishop Justice Akrofi, Jude Kofi Bucknor, Gifty Afenyi-Dadzie, Elsie Addo Awadzi, Dr. Ernest Ofori-Sarpong, and Dr Tanko Collins Asare
- Website: https://nationalcovidtrustfund.gov.gh/

The COVID-19 National Trust Fund was established by an act of Parliament (Act 1013) to mobilize funds to be used in complementing the government's efforts to address the COVID-19 pandemic in Ghana. It is managed by a 7-member board of trustees chaired by the former Chief Justice Sophia Akuffo
