= José Filomeno dos Santos =

Angolan businessman (born 1978)

- Born: 9 January 1978 (age 48); Luanda, Angola
- Other name: Zenu
- Education: University of Westminster
- Parent(s): José Eduardo dos Santos and Filomena Sousa

Jose Filomeno de Sousa dos Santos (born 9 January 1978) is an Angolan businessman, and the son of Angola's former President José Eduardo dos Santos, who ruled the country from 1979 to 2017.

== Early life and education ==
Jose Filomeno de Sousa dos Santos was born 9 January 1978, and raised in Luanda, Angola's capital, son of Filomena Sousa and Angola's former President José Eduardo dos Santos, who was elected as President of Angola on 21 September 1979, and served under multiple mandates until 25 September 2017.

In 2003, Jose Filomeno de Sousa dos Santos completed his postgraduate studies in Information Management and Finance at the University of Westminster, in the United Kingdom.

== Career ==
In 2012, José Filomeno dos Santos was appointed to the board of the Fundo Soberano de Angola (FSDEA), Angola's sovereign wealth fund and in June 2013 he succeeded Armando Manuel as chairman. During his tenure, FSDEA underwent a substantial regulatory overhaul that defined its current organizational structure, investment strategy and regulatory obligations to the Angolan state.

On 5 August 2014, FSDEA became a member of the International Forum of Sovereign Wealth Funds, a multinational body of sovereign investors, co-founded by the International Monetary Fund to strengthen the global investment community through dialogue and self-assessment by adherence to the set of standards for governance, investment and risk management practices, referred to as the Santiago Principles.

Under Dos Santos leadership, FSDEA also reached the ranking of 8/10 in the Linaburg-Maduell Transparency Index, an assessment model developed by the Sovereign Wealth Fund Institute to encourage government-owned investment funds to disclose their goals and operations.

His chairmanship marked a period in which all FSDEA annual financial statements were independently audited by one of the big four international accounting firms and published on the official state newspaper, consistent with his assertions of the openness of the institution to public scrutiny.

After President João Lourenço was elected, he dismissed dos Santos from his position before the end of his term. Following Dos Santos' removal by Lourenço, on 10 January 2018 there ensued a prolonged period of lawfare, reportedly aimed to downplay or negative his prior record of note, and at times described as a character assassination attempt.

== Legal disputes ==
On 27 April 2018, the government of Angola attempted legal proceedings against Jose Filomeno dos Santos in the High Court of Justice of England and Wales. The allegations related to contractual issues related to management of the FSDEA. On 16 August 2018, the Court dismissed the proceedings due to insufficient grounds, and a subsequent application for permission to appeal was refused.

As a sign of disapproval of the High Court of Justice of England and Wales' judgment, the State Attorney of Angola placed Dos Santos under an investigative pre-trial detention in September 2018, while attempting to build a similar case against him in Angola. Nonetheless, the State Attorney of Angola discharged Dos Santos from detention in March 2019, after failing to bring such case before an Angolan court successfully.

Further to the lawfare unleashed under President Lourenço's rule, the State Attorney of Angola brought forward another legal case against Dos Santos and other officials to the Supreme Court of Angola on 9 December 2019. These separate proceedings related to the management of Angolan Central Bank's reserves, in spite of Dos Santos' never having worked or held any position at that institution. In relation to this separate case, On 4 April 2024, the Constitutional Court of Angola ruled in Dos Santos favor, by declaring all Supreme Court's rulings unconstitutional and nullifying the entire legal process. Following a lengthy legal process Angola's top court declared his 2002 conviction void and unconstitutional, stating the previous verdict breached "the principles of legality, adversarial proceedings, a fair and consistent judgment and rights to the defence.”

On December 26, 2024, President João Lourenço conceded to issuing an official pardon to José Filomeno dos Santos, which Dos Santos declined to accept because the sentencing in question had already been overturned by Angola's constitutional court earlier that year, wherein the judgement cleared all verdicts against Dos Santos in that legal case.

== Personal life ==
In August 2013, dos Santos was ranked at number 26 out of the top 100 wealth fund chiefs in the world. The rankings are an annual measurement process run by The Sovereign Wealth Fund Institute and display a desire to diversify the economy of a nation highly dependent on its petroleum exports. Dos Santos' father, former president José Eduardo dos Santos, died at the Teknon Medical Centre, in Spain, where he had been receiving medical treatment since his retirement from politics in 2019. Dos Santos was referenced in the media, during July 2022, lamenting the ban on witnessing his father's death abroad, due to measures he considered unlawful and inhumane.
