= Ghana Petroleum Funds =

Sovereign wealth fund of Ghana

The Ghana Petroleum Fund is a sovereign wealth fund of the Ghanaian government and comprises the Ghana Stabilization Fund (GSF) and the Ghana Heritage Fund (GHF). The Petroleum Fund receives 30 percent of Ghana's oil revenues, which are divided between the GSF and the GHF. The funds must be managed transparently and operated within their constitutional and legal framework.

== History ==
The Petroleum Revenue Management Act (PRMA) 2011, Act 815, was passed by Parliament and approved by the President on 11 April 2011, to regulate the management of petroleum revenues. The Act defines the framework for the collection, allocation, and management of petroleum revenues in a responsible, accountable, and sustainable manner for the benefit of Ghanaian citizens. The PRMA was amended by the Petroleum Revenue Management Amendment Act 2015, Act 893.

By the end of 2024, the fund's investments had reached US$1.4 billion.

== Memberships ==
The Fund is a member of the International Forum of Sovereign Wealth Funds (IFSWF) and has therefore also committed itself to the Santiago Principles for appropriate conduct and proper business practices..
