= Indigenius AI =

Nigerian AI technology company

- Formerly: CDIAL (Centre for Digitization of Indigenous African Languages)
- Type: Private
- Industry: Artificial intelligence
- Founded: 2021 in Lagos, Nigeria
- Founder: Olayinka Iyinolakan, Shona O. Oluwatola
- Headquarters: Lagos, Nigeria
- Key people: Olayinka Iyinolakan (CEO), Shona O. Oluwatola (COO)
- Products: Agents Studio, Creative Studio, Indigenius 2 models
- Website: indigenius.ai

Indigenius AI, formerly CDIAL (Centre for Digitization of Indigenous African Languages), is a Nigerian technology company that develops voice artificial intelligence for African languages. Its systems are used to automate customer service for banks and telecommunications operators, and operate in Nigerian Pidgin, Yoruba, Hausa and Igbo, among other languages. The company was founded in 2021 in Lagos, Nigeria, and later adopted the name Indigenius AI.

== History ==
The company was founded in 2021 in Lagos by Olayinka Iyinolakan and Shona O. Oluwatola, and worked initially on digitizing African languages.

In January 2023 the company released a dictionary translating modern terms into African languages. In May 2023 it released a multilingual keyboard covering 180 African languages.

== Technology ==
The company's approach centres on speech rather than text. Writing in TechCrunch in June 2024, Dominic-Madori Davis and Tage Kene-Okafor described it as a chatbot covering most African languages and dialects, built around "speech patterns rather than text". They presented it as a response to the limited coverage of the continent's 2,000-plus languages in widely used systems such as ChatGPT and Gemini.

The company's platform is divided into two products. Agents Studio provides voice agents that handle inbound and outbound telephone calls, for uses including customer support, sales and debt recovery, appointment booking and identity verification. Creative Studio converts written text into spoken African-language audio and transcribes African-language recordings, and is aimed at film, podcast and game production. Both run on the company's Indigenius 2 model family, which it says is trained on 25,000 hours of speech across 11 languages, four of them African.

== Recognition ==
In November 2023 the company received a $50,000 prize at the Black Ambition competition founded by Pharrell Williams.

In 2024 it received an award from the Federal Government of Nigeria as part of that year's MSME Day programme, was selected for the first cohort of the Accelerate Africa programme, and joined the eighth cohort of the Google for Startups Accelerator Africa.

In June 2026 the company received $250,000 from Cascador and a $10,000 innovation prize from the Nigeria Sovereign Investment Authority.
