= Fundo Soberano de Angola =

Sovereign wealth fund of Angola

Angola Sovereign [Wealth] Fund
- Native name: Fundo Soberano de Angola
- Type: Sovereign wealth fund
- Predecessor: Fundo Petrolifero de Angola
- Founded: 17 October 2012
- Headquarters: Luanda, Angola
- Area served: Worldwide
- Key people: Armando Manuel
- AUM: US$ 3.9 billion (2024)
- Owner: Government of Angola
- Website: fundosoberano.ao

The Fundo Soberano de Angola (lit. 'Angola Sovereign [Wealth] Fund', FSDEA) is the sovereign wealth fund of Angola. It is a member of the International Forum of Sovereign Wealth Funds, and therefore has signed up to the Santiago Principles on best practice in managing sovereign wealth funds. The FSDEA is meant to play an important role in promoting Angola’s social and economic development and generating wealth for its people. The fund was rated by the SWFI in February 2015 with a ranking of 8 out of 10.

== History ==
On November 20, 2008, Angola’s President, José Eduardo dos Santos, announced to establish a special commission to build the foundations for a new sovereign wealth fund "to promote growth, prosperity and social and economic development across Angola". In 2011, the fund was ratified and established as "Fundo Soberano de Angola". It replaced the former Fundo Petrolífero de Angola (Oil for Infrastructure Fund). At inception it was the second largest investment fund in Sub-Saharan Africa after Botswana's Pula Fund, having had an initial capital of US$5 billion. It is also envisaged that it will receive supplementary funding each year equivalent to the sales value of 100,000 barrels of oil per day (5.6% of the total daily petroleum output). The value of this volume may be about US$3.5 billion every year.

On January 12, 2018, João Lourenço, the current president of the Republic, elects the new administration of the Sovereign Fund of Angola, asking them to recover the "important role" of the institution in the country's economy, in order to guarantee "a more efficient and transparent use of the state's strategic resources ". In December 2024, the fund has US$ 3.9 billion in assets under management.

== Corporate Governance ==
The fund has pledged its adherence to the Santiago Principles and will aim to be rated on the Linaburg-Maduell Transparency Index in 2014. It will also be subject to an annual performance assessment by the Angolan Parliament. In November 2013, Deloitte was appointed as the independent external auditor.

Based on an investment policy that was approved in June 2013, the FSDEA aims to generate wealth for future generations and support Angola’s social and economic development. The FSDEA was also recognized as a transparent SWF sovereign wealth fund by the SWFI (Sovereign Wealth Fund Institute) in February 2015 with a ranking of 8 out of 10, which is a significant milestone for the fund. Fundo Soberano de Angola is committed to operate transparently, responsibly and in full compliance with the laws and regulations of Angola and the countries where it will make future investments. The fund was chaired by Armando Manuel until 2013, when José Filomeno dos Santos, the son of the then president of Angola, was appointed chairman. He was succeeded in 2018 by Carlos Alberto Lopes, who chaired the Fund until Armando Manuel's reappointment in December 2023.

=== Board of Directors ===
The Board of Directors is composed of the seven members listed below:

- Armando Manuel – Chairman
- Alcides Horácio Frederico Safeca – Executive Director
- Igor Ricardo de Pina Lima – Executive Director
- Gabriel Augusto da Silva – Executive Director
- Pedro Sebastião Teta – Executive Director
- Ismael Abraão Gaspar Martins – Non-Executive Director
- Rui Jorge Van-Dúnem Alves de Ceita – Administrador Executivo

=== Supervisory Board ===
- Helder da Costa Cristelo
- Andreia Vanessa de Sousa Simões – Voting Member of the Board
- Manuel da Rocha – Voting Member of the Board

=== Advisory Council ===
The FSDEA’s advisory council includes the Minister of Finance, the Minister of Economy, the Minister of Planning and Territorial Development and the Governor of the National Bank of Angola.

The council gives opinions on the FSDEA regarding issues such as corporate governance, portfolio development, investment strategy, overseas and local investment and regulatory policy issues, global economics and other key factors that impact the Fund’s business.

== Investments ==
Half of the funds will be invested in alternative investments mainly in agriculture, mining, infrastructure and real estate – with particular focus on hospitality – in Angola and the continent. The remainder of the portfolio will be allocated to high quality cash and fixed income instruments, issued by sovereign agencies, global and emerging equities as well as further alternative investments around the globe. A maximum of 7.5% of the portfolio may be used for social development projects in areas such as education, income generation access to clean water, health care and energy. A first project was Kamba Dyami that is part of One Laptop per Child.

On 30 March 2016 the FSDEA announced to be financing 10 projects in health, education, water supply and entrepreneurship in the provinces of Cabinda, Bengo, Huambo, Bié, Cunene, Benguela and Kwanza Norte valued at US$12 million. Also, the “Kijinga” programme has been launched, aimed at the reconstruction of the old “Super” soap factory.

FSDEA launched a Hotel fund for Africa with US$500 million in 2014.
