= Olusegun Alebiosu =

Nigerian business executive

- Born: OMUOOKE-EKITI
- Education: University of Lagos, London School of Economics, Harvard Kennedy School
- Occupation: Business executive
- Known for: CEO of First Bank of Nigeria Limited

Olusegun Alebiosu is a Nigerian business executive who serves as the managing director and chief executive officer of First Bank of Nigeria Limited.

== Education ==
Alebiosu holds a degree in Industrial Relations and Personnel Management and a Master of International Law and Diplomacy, both from the University of Lagos. He also earned a Master of Science degree in Development Studies from the London School of Economics and Political Science and is an alumnus of Harvard Kennedy School of Government.

He is affiliated with several professional bodies, including the Institute of Chartered Accountants of Nigeria, the Nigerian Institute of Management, the Chartered Institute of Bankers of Nigeria, and the Nigerian Institute of International Affairs.

== Career ==
Alebiosu began his banking career in 1991 at Oceanic Bank Plc (Now Ecobank Plc).

Prior to his current role, Alebiosu served as the Chief Risk Officer of Coronation Merchant Bank and later assumed the same position at First Bank of Nigeria Limited in September 2016. He has also held positions at the African Development Bank and United Bank for Africa.

In July 2020, he became the chairman of the CRC Credit Bureau.

In January 2022, Alebiosu was appointed to the board of First Bank of Nigeria Limited as executive director, Credit Risk Officer & Executive Compliance Officer until his appointment as the CEO in April 2024.
