= Ireland Strategic Investment Fund =

Sovereign wealth fund of Ireland

The Ireland Strategic Investment Fund (ISIF; Irish: An Ciste Infheistíochta Straitéisí d’Éirinn), managed and controlled by the National Treasury Management Agency (NTMA), is a sovereign wealth fund of Ireland. Its purpose is to invest the state's capital in order to promote economic activity and employment in Ireland. Its predecessor was the National Pensions Reserve Fund (NPRF).

In 2024, the fund was one of the 50 largest sovereign wealth funds in the world. By the middle of 2025, the fund had assets under management (AUM) of around $28 billion.

== History ==
The fund was established in 2014 as a strategic investor with strong connections in the public and private sectors.

When ISIF was established at the end of 2014 from the remnants of the National Pensions Reserve Fund, the state development fund was tasked with mobilizing €1 million in co-investments across its entire portfolio for every €1 million invested. Today, for every euro invested by the fund itself, around 1.6 million euros in co-investments typically flow into projects. Since its inception, ISIF has provided 6.5 billion euros for 188 investments, unlocking co-investment commitments of around 10.2 billion euros.

The ISIF consists of the discretionary portfolio and the managed portfolio. The managed portfolio is held by the ISIF under the direction of the Secretary of the Treasury. The discretionary portfolio pursues a "double bottom line" mandate to invest on a commercial basis to promote economic activity and employment in Ireland. ISIF primarily uses its capital and resources to address strategic challenges. ISIF focuses on transformative investments in its themes of climate, housing and supportive investments, scaling indigenous businesses, and food and agriculture. In addition, ISIF has the flexibility to invest in national and global assets in response to future macro events.

== Memberships ==
The Ireland Strategic Investment Fund is a member of the International Forum of Sovereign Wealth Funds (IFSWF) and has therefore also committed itself to the Santiago Principles for appropriate conduct and proper business practices.
