= Adesola Kazeem Adeduntan =

Nigerian business executive

Group Managing Director/CEO, First Bank of Nigeria Limited
- In office January 2016 – April 2024
- Preceded by: Bisi Onasanya
- Succeeded by: Olusegun Alebiosu

Director, Chief Financial Officer and Business Manager, Africa Finance Corporation
- In office November 2007 – June 2014

Senior Vice-President (General Manager) & Chief Financial Officer, Citibank Nigeria Limited
- In office September 2005 – October 2007

Senior Manager – Financial Services Industry, KPMG Professional Services
- In office June 2002 – October 2004

Personal details
- Born: Adeduntan Kazeem Adesola; 7 May 1969 (age 57) Ibadan, Oyo State, Nigeria
- Children: 3
- Education: University of Ibadan; Cranfield School of Management
- Profession: Banker; Accountant

Dr. Adesola Kazeem Adeduntan FCA, FCIB (born 7 May 1969) is a Nigerian banker, accountant and business executive whose career has centred on building and restructuring major financial institutions across Africa. He served as Group Chief Executive Officer of First Bank of Nigeria Limited from 2016 to 2024 the longest-serving chief executive in the modern history of Nigeria's oldest commercial bank, where he led a balance-sheet restructuring and digital-banking transformation credited with reducing the bank's non-performing loan ratio from a peak above 24 per cent to single digits and growing its digital customer base more than fourfold.

He was previously pioneer Chief Financial Officer and Business Manager of the Africa Finance Corporation (2007–2014), where he helped establish the finance and treasury architecture of what has since become one of Africa's highest-rated investment-grade development finance institutions.Earlier in his career he held senior finance roles at Citibank Nigeria and KPMG (formerly Arthur Andersen). Since leaving FirstBank in 2024, Adeduntan has founded Sequoia Financial Services Limited, an advisory and investment platform, and serves as Pro-Chancellor and Chairman of the Governing Council of Abiola Ajimobi Technical University, Ibadan. In 2026 he was named by the Alaafin of Oyo to hold the traditional title of Balogun of Oyo, succeeding the late Dr Victor Omololu Olunloyo; his installation was postponed following a security crisis in Oyo State. He also holds the traditional title of Apesinola of Ibadanland

== Early life and education ==
Adeduntan was born in Ibadan, Oyo State, into the Oriolowo family. He earned a Doctor of Veterinary Medicine (DVM) from the University of Ibadan in 1992, before moving into accounting and finance. He holds an MBA from Cranfield University in 2005, where he was a British Chevening Scholar, and was later named a Cranfield School of Management Distinguished Alumnus in 2020 and awarded an honorary Doctorate of Science in 2022. He has completed executive education at Harvard Business School, Stanford University and the Wharton School. He is a Fellow of both the Institute of Chartered Accountants of Nigeria and the Chartered Institute of Bankers of Nigeria.

== Career ==
Foundation Years: Arthur Andersen, KPMG and Citibank Nigeria (1995 – 2007)

Adeduntan began his career at Arthur Andersen in 1995, continuing at KPMG after Andersen's 2002 restructuring, where he rose to Senior Manager in the Financial Services division, working on strategy, audit, and mergers-and-acquisitions engagements for major Nigerian banks. He moved to Citibank Nigeria in 2005 as Senior Vice-President and Chief Financial Officer, where his responsibilities included the bank's recapitalisation to meet regulatory capital requirements. This decade across professional services and multinational banking established the finance, governance and risk expertise that underpinned his subsequent institutional roles.

Building the Africa Finance Corporation (2007 – 2014)

Adeduntan joined the Africa Finance Corporation (AFC) at its founding as pioneer Director, Chief Financial Officer and Business Manager, a position he held from November 2007 to June 2014.Building financial architecture, As pioneer CFO, he was responsible for building the corporation's finance and treasury systems from inception, at a time when AFC was newly established by African sovereign states to address the continent's infrastructure financing deficit. Capital formation and credit strength, AFC received its first long-term issuer credit rating an A3 rating from Moody's in 2014, the year of Adeduntan's departure; the rating has since been affirmed annually for over a decade and is described by Moody's and the World Economic Forum as among the highest investment-grade ratings of any African institution.

African Finance Corporation (2007 – 2014)

Adeduntan was the Director, Chief Financial Officer & Business Manager at the African Finance Corporation (AFC) from 2007 to 2014. He was responsible for the finance and treasury division and played a role in raising funds for the corporation during his tenure.

Transforming FirstBank (2014 – 2024)

Adeduntan joined First Bank of Nigeria in 2014 as Executive Director and Group Chief Financial Officer, becoming Group Managing Director/CEO in January 2016 and serving until April 2024 — a tenure of over nine years, the longest of any FirstBank chief executive in the bank's modern history.

Financial performance and balance-sheet restructuring, FirstBank's non-performing loan ratio fell from a peak of 24.7% in 2018 to 9.9% (2019), 7.7% (2020) and 6.1% (2021), following a restructuring of the bank's risk architecture and the write-off of legacy exposures. Total assets rose to roughly ₦8.5 trillion by end-2021, alongside sustained growth in profit before and after tax.Digital transformation and financial inclusion, Customer accounts grew from roughly 10 million in 2015 to over 36–42 million (including digital wallets) by 2021–2023, with FirstBank becoming the second-largest card issuer in Africa.The bank's FirstMonie agency banking network expanded significantly under his leadership as part of a wider financial-inclusion push.Leadership through sector-wide events, Adeduntan led FirstBank through the Central Bank of Nigeria's 2024 bank recapitalisation directive and the COVID-19 period, including the bank's role as a founding member of the Private Sector Coalition Against COVID-19 (CACOVID).

Under his leadership, First Bank implemented various digital initiatives, which included growing its digital customer base and expanding its agency banking network. He is also credited with overseeing efforts to reduce the bank’s Non-Performing Loans (NPLs) and improve its profitability.

Post-FirstBank Career: Sequoia Financial Services (2024–Present)

Following his departure from FirstBank, Adeduntan announced in February 2025 that he was founding Sequoia Financial Services Limited, describing it on LinkedIn as a new role as "President and Founder." Independent coverage describes the venture as a boutique advisory and investment platform focused on financial advisory, investment management and strategic consulting for high-net-worth individuals and businesses, and separately as "a boutique advisory platform focused on strategy, capital structuring, governance, and long-term value creation in emerging markets."

A Tribune Online report from July 2026 refers to Adeduntan as "Chairman of Sequoia Holdings," indicating the group may now operate under a broader holding structure beyond the original Financial Services entity.Claims that this structure extends into a minerals-exploration business ("Sequoia Minerals & Metals") or an upstream oil-and-gas operation (via Forte Upstream Services) could not be independently verified at the time of this draft and have been excluded — see the sourcing table at the end of this document.

Appointment as Pro-Chancellor and Chairman, Technical University, Ibadan

Board, Memberships and Associations

Adeduntan has served on the boards of various organizations, including:

- Chartered Institute of Bankers of Nigeria
- Nigeria Inter-Bank Settlement System Plc (NIBSS)
- Shared Agent Network Expansion Facilities (SANEF) Limited
- Lagos State Security Trust Fund
- Nigerian Economic Summit Group
- Africa Finance Corporation (AFC)
- FirstBank UK Ltd.
- FMDQ OTC Securities Exchange
- Sigma Educational Foundation

He is also a member of the Bretton Woods Committee, a nonpartisan network of individuals advocating for international economic cooperation.

== Awards and recognition ==
Adeduntan has received several awards throughout his career, including recognition from Global Finance Magazine, World Finance, Leadership Newspaper, and The Banker. His work in digital banking and retail banking has earned him awards in multiple categories, including Best Bank and Bank of the Year in various years. He has also received several honorary awards for his contributions to banking and economic development. Below is a timeline of major awards:

Major Awards Received by the Bank
Year	Award	Awarding Body
2016	Best Bank in Nigeria	Global Finance Magazine
2016	Best Private Bank	World Finance
2016	Digital Bank of Distinction	Global Finance Magazine
2017	Best Private Bank Nigeria	World Finance
2017	Most Innovative Bank Nigeria	International Finance Magazine
2018	Best Mobile Banking App Nigeria	Global Business Outlook Awards
2018	Most Innovative Bank in Nigeria	World Business Outlook Awards
2018	Bank of the Decade	Business Journal
2019	Bank of the Year Nigeria	International Investor
2019	Best Mobile Banking App Nigeria	Global Business Outlook
2020	Best Digital Bank in Nigeria	Digital Banker Africa
2020	Best Private Bank in Nigeria	Global Finance
2021	Best Banking Brand Nigeria	Global Brand Award
2021	Best Core Banking Implementation in Africa	Asian Banker Awards
2022	Retail Banking CEO of the Year	World Business Outlook
2022	Best Commercial Bank Executive	Capital Finance International
2022	Best Corporate Bank in Nigeria	Euromoney
2022	Best Corporate Bank in West Africa	Bankers Award
2023	African Bank of the Year	Africa Leadership Magazine
2023	Financial Institution of the Year	Afrexim Bank
2023	Best Private Bank in Nigeria	World Finance
2023	Best Corporate Bank in Nigeria	Euromoney

=== Honours ===
- Honorary Doctorate of Science (DSc), Cranfield University (2022)
- Honorary Doctorate of Science (DSc), University of Ibadan, conferred at the university's 77th Foundation Day and 2025 Convocation (17 November 2025), for contributions to Nigeria's financial sector

== Personal life ==
Adeduntan is married to Ameenat Adeduntan, with three children. He has spoken publicly of an interest in African folk music

== Traditional Leadership ==
Adeduntan was named by the Alaafin of Oyo, Oba (Dr) Abimbola Akeem Owoade I, to hold the title of Balogun of Oyo, succeeding the late Dr Victor Omololu Olunloyo. His installation, initially scheduled for 18 July 2026, was postponed by the Alaafin in deference to the abduction of 47 schoolchildren and teachers in Oyo State's Oriire Local Government Area.He also holds the traditional title of Apesinola (also rendered Apesin Ola) of Ibadanland.

== Philanthropy ==
Independently sourced philanthropic and civic involvement includes membership of the Sigma Educational Foundation, focused on tertiary education quality in Nigeria, and participation in the Private Sector Coalition Against COVID-19 (CACOVID) steering committee during his FirstBank tenure.
