= Michael Maduell =

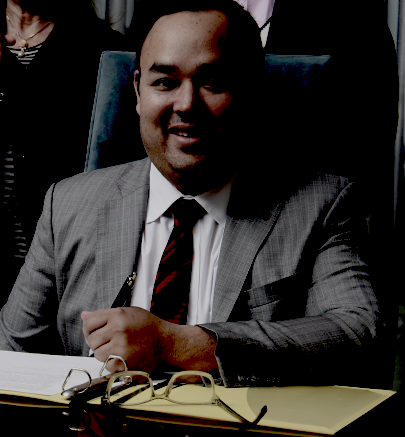
- Born: San Leandro, CA
- Education: California State University, Sacramento (BA); Saint Mary's College of California (MS)
- Occupations: Editor; Executive
- Known for: Entrepreneurship, sovereign wealth funds, media, pensions
- Title: CEO of Sovereign Wealth Fund Institute

Michael Maduell is an American business executive, financial researcher and commentator on sovereign wealth funds, he is the president of the Sovereign Wealth Fund Institute (SWFI).

== Early life and education ==
Michael Maduell was born in San Leandro, CA. His father, Robert (Bob) Maduell, was a procurement engineer at Hewlett Packard and his mother, Phuong (Linda) My Lam, is a Vietnamese war refugee who supported the U.S. as a language translator. Maduell went to high school at Rocky Mountain High School in Fort Collins, CO. Maduell is a graduate of California State University, Sacramento and has a Masters of Science in Finance from Saint Mary's College of California.

He is the grandson of Charles Edward Maduell, who founded Anamet Laboratories, Inc in Berkeley, California. He is a descendant of Carlos Maduell of Tortosa, Spain who immigrated to New Orleans in the 1800s working for the Avendano Brothers.

Michael interned at a low-income redevelopment agency located in Sacramento during college.

== Career ==
He has worked at the California Public Employees' Retirement System (CalPERS) and Reuters. He founded the Sovereign Wealth Fund Institute (SWFI). Maduell is a leading researcher, commentator, and advisor in the sovereign wealth fund, pension, and long-term institutional investor space.

== Economic and financial commentary ==
During the Libyan revolution in 2011, CNN Money interviewed Michael Maduell on Gaddafi's influence on sub-Saharan Africa and Libya's sovereign wealth fund. Maduell argued Gaddafi remained in power for so long because "Gadhafi is providing support where there is none."

In 2013, Michael Maduell commented on Temasek Holdings advancement of acquiring energy companies. He stated in CFO Insight, "This is a long-term investment in a major energy company that is currently discounted due to the YPF nationalisation [Repsol's subsidiary in Argentina, eds.]."

In 2013, policymakers and thinktanks were discussing ways to improve the U.S. economy, leading to the idea of creating a federal sovereign wealth fund. Maduell told CNBC in an article that creating a Norwegian-like wealth fund would trigger "a heated debate between the federal government vs. state governments over resources," Maduell added. "The politics would be paralyzing, which is why it hasn't been done yet."

In 2016, Michael Maduell was quoted in the LA Times saying, "Sovereign wealth funds are going to play a much bigger role now in tech", and, "They have the capital and are looking for the best returns."

He was a frequent contributor to CNBC.

Maduell is sought out on his expertise on sovereign wealth funds, including institutional investors in the Middle East and their influence on foreign policy.

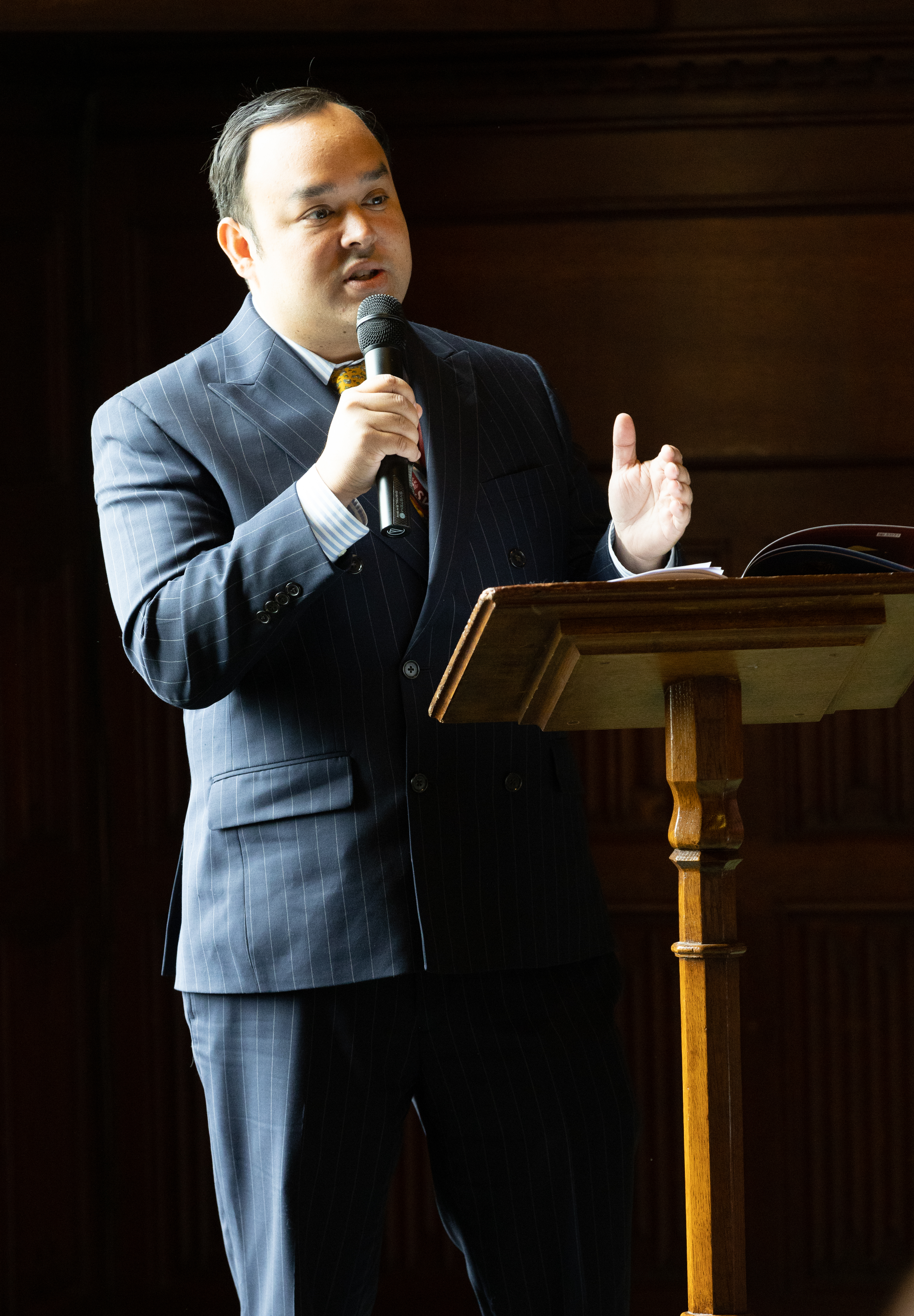
