= FBNQuest Merchant Bank =

Nigerian banking services company

- Type: Subsidiary
- Industry: Finance
- Founded: 1995; 31 years ago
- Headquarters: Lagos, Nigeria
- Key people: Bisi Onasanya (Chairman), Laoye Jaiyeola (MD & CEO)
- Products: Financial services
- Parent: EverQuest Acquisition LLP
- Website: fbnquest.com

FBNQuest Merchant Bank (previously known as Kakawa Discount House) is one of the five operational discount houses in Nigeria which serves as government financial tools and acts as a middle access points between all other banks in Nigeria and the Apex bank of Nigeria, the Central Bank of Nigeria (CBN).

In December 2025, EverQuest Acquisition LLP completed the acquisition of FBNQuest. As with all discount houses, trade in governments bonds and treasury bills are the primary business functions.

== History ==
=== Foundation of the discount houses ===
The Discount Houses sub-sector of the Nigerian financial services industry was born in 1995 and came as an offspring of the federal government of that country through CBN. These DH became the venue through which banks were able to channel excess liquidity and access same to and from the CBN.

A secondary market was created through the discount houses particularly for the trading of Treasury bills and other commercial bills. The name Kakawa comes from Kakawa Street, where the headquarters of the majority shareholder, First Bank of Nigeria (FBN), is located.

At that time, its shareholders at that time were FBN, Guaranty Trust Bank, Sterling Bank, First City Monument Bank, Skye Bank, and Unity Bank.

=== Expansion ===
Kakawa evolved from being primarily a mono-product institution into being the pioneer for the marketing of Treasury bills to individual investors through the introduction of its proprietary the Treasury Bill Backed Investment (TBBI) product in 1997. The following year, Corporate Finance identified Corporate Finance was identified and it established an advisory services unit (Wealth Management Unit).

Prior to its incorporation in 2004, Kakawa Asset Management (KAM) operated as a department of Kakawa for three years. It was primarily established out of the need to provide clients who had worked with Kakawa over time, with longer-term investment options in the financial services market. KAM was registered with the Securities and Exchange Commission (Nigeria) (SEC) as a portfolio/fund manager and Investment Adviser.

=== Acquisition by First Bank Of Nigeria ===
When FBNQuest acquired its remaining shares in 2015, Kakawa Discount House was renamed to FBNQuest Merchant Bank, the brand name of the merchant banking and the asset management businesses of FBN Holdings; it commenced merchant banking operations in November 2015.

=== Acquisition by EverQuest Acquisition LLP ===
In December 2025, it was announced that the Nigerian firm had been fully sold to EverQuest Acquisition LLP.
