= Laoye Jaiyeola =

Nigerian economist (born 1961)

Joseph Olaoye Jaiyeola (JOJ)
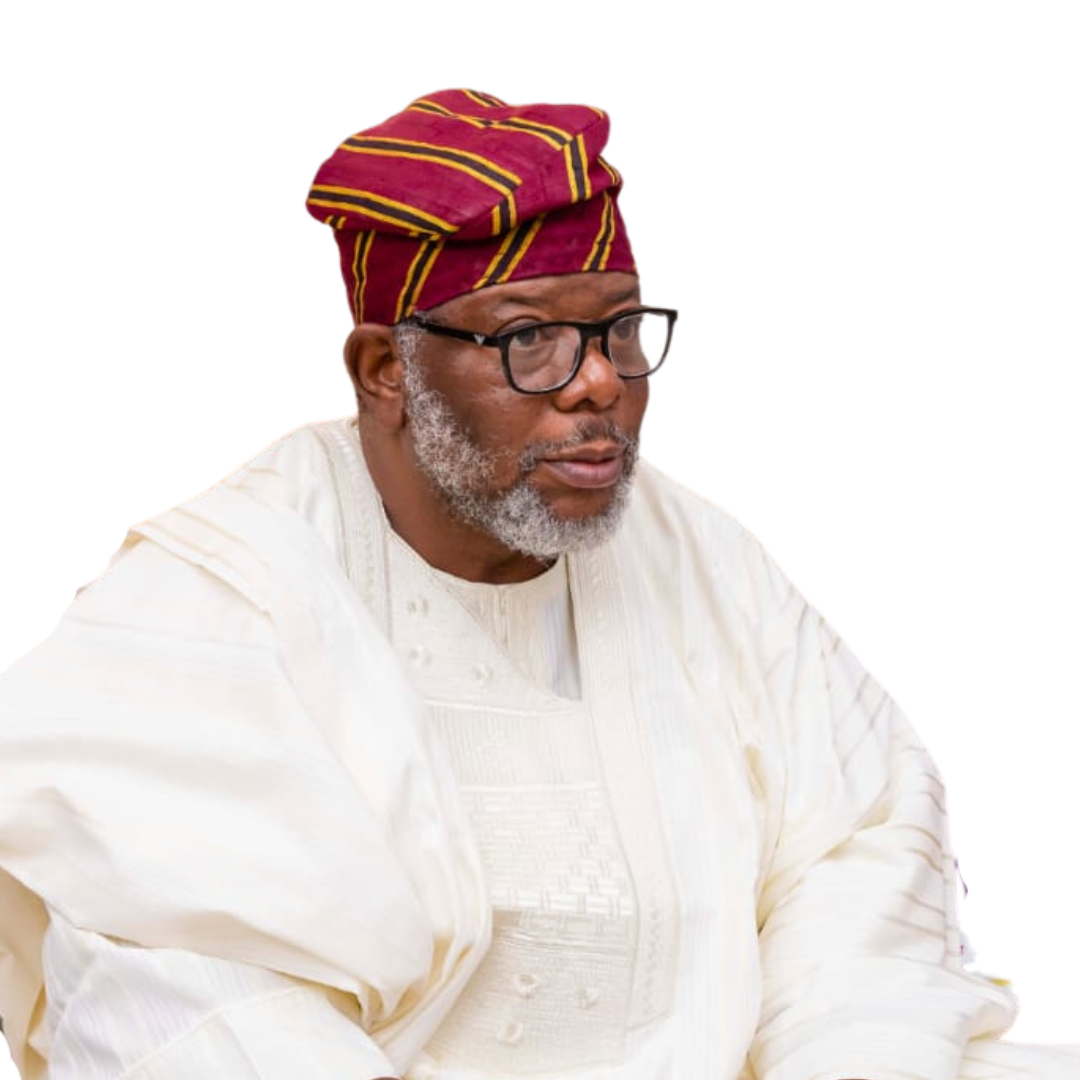
- Born: 16 June 1961 (age 65); Okemesi - Ekiti, Ekiti State.
- Education: Obafemi Awolowo University, Ile - Ife, Osun State.
- Occupation: Economist.
- Website: laoyejaiyeola.com

Laoye Jaiyeola is a Nigerian economist who is former the CEO of the Nigerian Economic Summit Group.

He is a policy expert for the Policy Center for the New South, Morocco focusing on Africa and its macro economic regulations. He contributed to the set up of the policy think tank namely the Policy Innovation Centre, a wing of the NESG which was funded by Bill and Melinda Gates Foundation.

He was the president and chairman of the Chartered Institute of Bankers of Nigeria (CIBN) and member of the CBN's Monetary Policy Committee from 2010–2012.

He is a fellow of the Chartered Institute of Bankers of Nigeria, the Institute of Chartered Accountants of Nigeria (ICAN), a member of the Chartered Institute of Bankers, Scotland; and a Fellow of the Senior Executive Program at Harvard Kennedy School of Government.

== Career ==
Jaiyeola began his corporate career working with the Central Bank of Nigeria for over fifteen years. Afterwards, he joined the Kakawa Discount House Limited in 1995, which later became the FBNQuest Merchant Bank. After ten years of service, he was appointed the CEO and Managing Director of Kakawa. He would hold this position for about a decade. In 2015, he was appointed as the CEO of the Nigerian Economic Summit Group under the Administration of President Muhammadu Buhari.

Jaiyeola is the Chairman of Kainos Edge Consulting Ltd, an economic research, environmental, social and corporate governance consulting firm. He also established the Hillside University of Science and Technology.

== Education ==
He holds a Bachelor's degree in Economics from Obafemi Awolowo University and a Master’s degree in Banking and Finance from the University of Lagos. He also holds a Master’s of Business Administration from Bangor University, Wales, United Kingdom.

== Personal life ==
He is married to Soledemi Olutoyin Jaiyeola, and has three children.
