= Kobina Bucknor =

Ghanaian animal scientist and painter (1925–1975)

- Born: 1925; Gold Cosast
- Died: 1975 (aged 49–50)
- Citizenship: Ghana
- Occupations: animal scientist; painter
- Notable work: Apofo Edodwir (The Arrival of the Fishing Fleet, Elmina Bay); Kadodo- Atsia (The spirit of the Agodzo Dances); At the Fish and Vegetable Market; Calabash Musiga

Kobina Bucknor (1925–1975) was a Ghanaian animal scientist and painter.

== Early life and education ==
He was born in 1925 in Gold Coast, now Ghana. He attended St. Augustine's College in Cape Coast at his secondary level and University College of the Gold Coast (now University of Ghana) where he acquired a Bachelor of Science degree in zoology. In 1965, he obtained a doctorate degree from Cornell University.

== Career ==
After his study, he joined the staff of the Ghana Academy of Sciences. He later left for Cornell University after which he came back to work with the Animal Research Institute in Ghana, and there he held the position of a director.

He held his first exhibition in Accra in 1966. He worked as a PhD trained research scientist in biology. He also served on the board directors of the Arts Council of Ghana as the chairman.

== Works ==
Bucknor used a style called "sculptural idiom" in his paintings which depicts life and culture in Ghana. This style, he claimed, was inspired by the silent wooden sculptures of Africa. To express his style, Bucknor said he captures the abstractions of the sculptural form, isolate the essence of the sculptural inspiration, digest what the inspiration presents and transform it into individual creative expression.

Some of his works include:

- Apofo Edodwir (The Arrival of the Fishing Fleet, Elmina Bay)
- Kadodo- Atsia (The spirit of the Agodzo Dances)
- At the Fish and Vegetable Market
- Calabash Musiga

== Personal life ==
His son was Ghanaian actor Charles Kofi Bucknor.
