= Adewale Laoye =

Nigerian poet and singer

Prince Adewale Laoye, popularly known as (Drummer of Peace) is a Nigerian singer, poet, thespian and pioneer of the modern art of African Talking drum. The Guardian newspaper described him as the Modern master of the African talking drum. Laoye is the founder of “Aafin Ilu” ( Palace of Drum), a cultural outfit designed to promote performing Arts and Cultural Events, through the infusing of the knowledge of Talking Drum, to celebrate African culture. He is also one of the progenitors of the late Oba Laoye, Timi of Ede, the drummer King.
