= Nigerian Economic Summit Group =

Budgeting, institution and economic performance in Nigeria

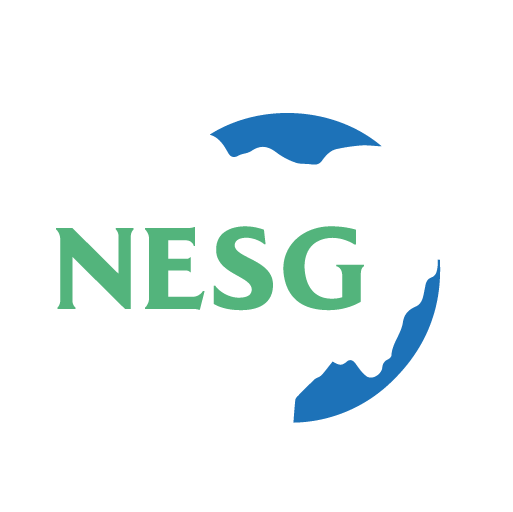
- NESG Logo
- Abbreviation: NESG
- Founder: Chief Ernest Shonekan GCFR; Mr Pascal Dozie; Alhaji Ahmadu Joda
- Type: Non-profit, Non-partisan think tank organization
- Headquarters: Lagos, Nigeria
- Location: No 6, Oba Elegushi Street, Off Oba Oyekan Avenue, Ikoyi, Lagos
- Chairman, Board of Directors: Olaniyi Yusuf
- CEO: Tayo Aduloju
- Key people: Laoye Jaiyeola, Olaniyi Yusuf, Tayo Aduloju
- Website: https://www.nesgroup.org

The Nigerian Economic Summit Group (NESG) is a non-profit, non-partisan, private sector organisation with a mandate to promote and champion the reform of the Nigerian economy into a modern, globally competitive, sustainable, inclusive, open economy.

== History ==
In 1993, a group of private sector leaders representing key economic sectors conceived the Nigerian Economic Summit (NES) and sustained it as a platform for bringing together private sector leaders and senior public sector officials to discuss and dialogue on the future of the Nigerian Economy.

Three years later, in 1996, the Nigerian Economic Summit Group (NESG) was established and incorporated as a non-profit, non-partisan private sector organisation with a mandate to promote and champion the reform of the Nigerian economy into an open, private sector-led globally competitive economy.

In 2022, the Nigerian Economic Summit Group appointed Olaniyi Yusuf as its new chairman. Mr Yusuf, who until his appointment was the first vice chairman of the NESG, took over from Asue Ighodalo, who was appointed in 2018 following the retirement of Mr Kyari Bukar.

In 2023, the NESG announced the appointment of Dr Tayo Aduloju as the new Chief Executive Officer (CEO) of the NESG, effective from 1 January 2024. Until his appointment, Tayo Aduloju was the Chief Operating Officer (COO) and Senior Fellow, Economic Policy, Strategy, and Competitiveness of the NESG.

== The Nigerian Economic Summit ==
The annual Nigerian Economic Summit (NES) is organised in collaboration with the Federal Ministry of Budget and National Planning. The Summit is a yearly gathering of high-level public and private sector leaders in Abuja, the nation’s capital, for dialogue on Nigeria’s economic management.

It brings together chief executives and top-level decision-makers from the private sector and the highest level policymaking officials from the public sector to discuss how best to grow the economy and to monitor the progress being made. Traditionally, the President of the Federal Republic of Nigeria (FRN), the Vice President, Ministers and other top-level government officials participate actively at the NES.

Summit Themes
Years	Themes
1999	Rebuilding the Nigerian Economy and Enhancing Productivity
2000	Breakthrough Economic Growth: An Action Plan
2001	Nigeria's Economic Priorities: How Do We Deliver?
2002	Nigeria: Putting the Economy First
2003	Nigeria: Partnering for Growth and Transformation
2004	
2005	Building Momentum for Economic Transformation and Growth
2006	Sustaining Reforms and Unlocking Nigeria's Potential
2007	Nigeria: Positioning for the Top 20 League
2008	The Race to 2020: The Realities. The Possibilities
2009	10 Years of Nigeria's Economic Progress: Bridging the Implementation Gaps
2010	Nigeria at 50: The Challenge of Visionary Leadership and Good Governance
2011	Attracting Foreign Direct Investment through Global Partnerships
2012	Deregulation, Cost of Governance and Nigeria's Economic Prospects
2013	Growing Agriculture as a Business to Diversify Nigeria's Economy
2014	Transforming Education Through Partnerships for Global Competitiveness
2015	Tough Choices: Achieving Competitiveness, Inclusive Growth and Sustainability
2016	Made-In-Nigeria
2017	Opportunities, Productivity, and Employment: Actualizing the Economic Recovery and Growth Plan
2018	Poverty to Prosperity: Making Governance and Institutions Work
2019	Nigerian 2050: Shifting Gears
2020	Building Partnerships for Resilience
2021	Securing Our Future: The Fierce Urgency of Now
2022	2023 and Beyond: Priorities for Shared Prosperity
2023	Pathways to Sustainable Economic Transformation and Inclusion
2024	Collaborative Action for Growth, Competitiveness and Stability

== Partnerships ==
=== NESG/NGF Economic Roundtable (NNER) ===
The NESG/NGF Economic Roundtable (NNER) roundtable is a partnership between the Nigerian Governors’ Forum and the NESG. The roundtable works with sub-nationals to promote economic cooperation in clusters capable of taking advantage of economic corridors to create jobs in logistics, agriculture, storage and others.

=== Nigeria Triple Helix Roundtable (NTHR) ===
The Nigeria Triple Helix Roundtable (NTHR) was launched on the 20th of September 2019 as a permanent platform for implementing the government-academia-industry collaboration towards fostering economic growth and national development in Nigeria. It is the first practical expression of the Triple-Helix model in the country, coming after the signing of an MoU between the National Universities Commission (NUC) (for academia) and the Nigerian Economic Summit Group (NESG) (for industry), and the interactive session and retreat which held thereafter.

=== Debt Management Roundtable (DMR) ===
The Debt Management Roundtable (DMR) on debt restructuring and social financing was instituted in March 2021 by the Nigerian Economic Summit Group (NESG) with the support of the Open Society Initiative for West Africa (OSIWA). The Roundtable is expected to provide recommendations on debt management and sustainability, with a view to engaging policymakers on debt restructuring and social financing in the West African region, using Nigeria as a case study. Public debts in ECOWAS have spiraled upwards more than four folds since the debt relief period (2005-2006).

=== NESG Bridge Fellowship ===
The NESG Bridge Fellowship was initiated in the year 2019 by the board of directors to celebrate the 25th Anniversary of the Nigerian Economic Summit (NES#25). The NESG, in collaboration with LEAP Africa, launched the NESG Bridge Fellowship.

== Interventions ==
=== National Agriculture Seeds Council Act ===
The NESG engaged in advocacy programs prior to the passage and signing into law of the National Agriculture seeds council Act 2019. The Act seeks to make the seeds market more structured and enables the National Agricultural Seeds Council (NASC) to regularly publish the National Seed Catalogues showing seed and price varieties eligible for certification in Nigeria.

=== Fertiliser Quality Control Act ===
The NESG and other stakeholders partnered to ensure the passage of the Fertiliser Quality Control Bill 2019 to help safeguard farmers against nutrient deficiencies that may occur as a result of the use of adulterated fertilisers. The Act also seeks to create an enabling environment for businesses in the fertiliser industry to thrive and Improve the productivity of the agriculture sector.

=== Plant Variety Protection (PVP) Bill ===
The NESG in partnership with the Partnership for Inclusive Agricultural Transformation in Africa (PIATA), together with AGRA, the Rockefeller Foundation, the Gates Foundation and USAID, collaborated with the National Agricultural Seed Council (NASC) to support the enaction of legislation that will provide a plant variety protection system for Nigeria. The PVP when passed into law is expected to incentivize national and multinational agribusiness investments and aid the development of Nigeria's Agriculture value chain.

=== National Food Safety & Quality Bill (Foodorado) ===
The Nigerian Economic Summit Group (NESG) in its drive to ensure safe, nutritious and affordable foods for all Nigerians is supporting the enactment and passage of a food safety and Quality Bill. Through the National Assembly Business Environment Roundtable (NASSBER), the Partnership for Inclusive Agricultural Transformation in Africa (PIATA), together with AGRA, the Rockefeller Foundation, Bill & Melinda Gates Foundation and USAID, the NESG has been collaborating with the Federal ministry of health and other relevant ministries and agencies of government to support the enaction of legislation that will support and enhance food safety and security for Nigeria.

== NASSBER ==
The National Assembly Business Environment Roundtable (NASSBER) is a partnership between the National Assembly, the Nigerian Economic Summit Group, and the Nigerian Bar Association’s Section on Business Law to initiate and review business, investment, and job creating laws in Nigeria. This collaboration established a platform for the private sector to support the legislature in its drafting, deliberations, discussions, and review of laws that will improve Nigeria’s business environment. It is expected that through this supportive work, and resulting legislation, Nigeria’s economy will achieve inclusive growth and sustainability, create jobs and generally cater to the wellbeing of Nigerians. The NESG serves as the secretariat of NASSBER.

== NESG Radio ==
The NESG Radio is a traditionally syndicated podcast that keeps Nigerians informed through localised content on economic policies and issues across sectors of the Nigerian economy. The radio aims at extending research-based advocacy and impactful policy-making to all Nigerians, including the urban technology inclined audiences, as well as rural dwellers. The radio has had guests from the private sector, public sectors, civil societies and donor communities speak on issues of national interests.

== Policy Innovation Centre (PIC) ==
The PIC is the first national institutionalized behavioural initiative in Africa and was conceptualized to support government and private stakeholders in making behaviourally informed decisions as well as generate evidence through behavioural studies for interventions in critical thematic areas. The PIC is an initiative of the Nigeria Economic Summit Group (NESG) and is supported by Rockefeller Philanthropy Advisors (RPA), with funding from the Bill and Melinda Gates Foundation (BMGF). The PIC support ongoing efforts on critical priorities such as the Sustainable Development Goals (SDGs) especially Gender Equality, No Poverty, Quality Education, Good Health and Wellbeing, Partnership for the Goals.

== Ernest Shonekan Centre for Legislative Reforms and Economic Development (ESC) ==
The Ernest Shonekan Centre for Legislative Reforms and Economic Development (ESC) is an initiative of the Nigerian Economic Summit Group (NESG). The Centre focuses on research, knowledge development, technical assistance, advocacy, and stakeholder engagement across key sectors of the economy. It seeks to collaborate with the National Assembly Legislative Transparency Forum (NALTF) in areas of mutual interest, with the aim of supporting effective governance and contributing to Nigeria’s economic development.
