= Elsie Addo Awadzi =

Ghanaian lawyer

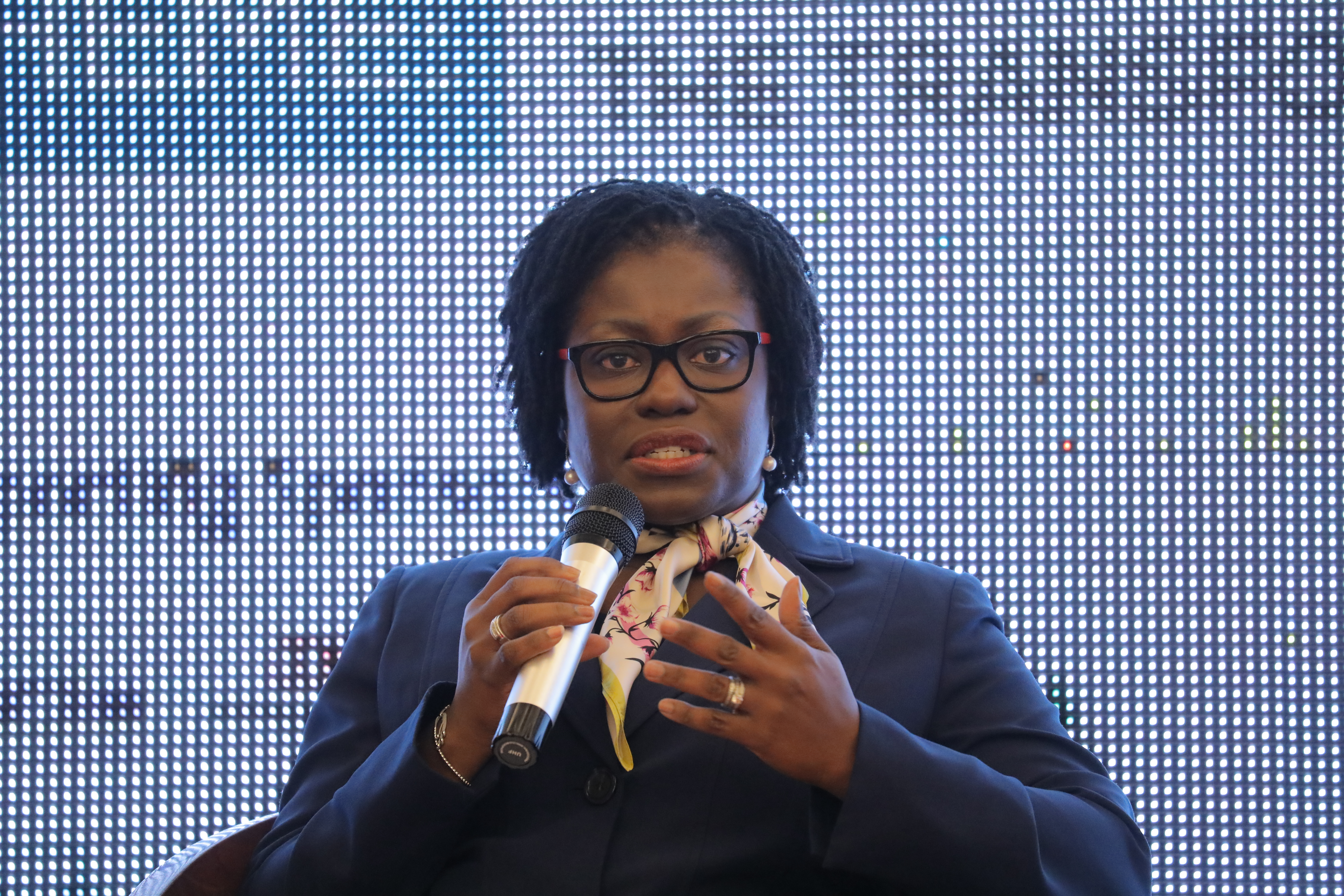
- Addo speaking at the Ghana Securities Industry Association Summit during their 2018 Capital Market Week.
- Born: Ghana
- Occupations: Lawyer, economist, author
- Known for: 2nd deputy governor of Bank of Ghana
- Notable work: Designing Legal Frameworks for Public Debt Management

Mrs. Elsie Addo Awadzi is a Ghanaian economic and financial lawyer. She was appointed by Ghana's President, Nana Addo Dankwa Akuffo Addo, as the 2nd deputy governor of the Bank of Ghana in February 2018. She is the second female to hold that position. She was elected as Chairperson of the Alliance for Financial Inclusion's Gender Inclusive Finance Committee in 2020.

== Education ==
Elsie Addo graduated from the University of Ghana Business School and University of Ghana Faculty of Law with degrees in L.L.B (1993) and an M.B.A. in Finance (2000). She then furthered her education at the Georgetown University Law Center, where she acquired a master of law degree in international business and economic law (2012).

She later proceeded to the Ghana School of Law and obtained her post-graduate Qualifying Certificate to practice Law in 1995.

== Career ==
Elsie Addo worked as a commissioner of Ghana's Securities and Exchange Commission for six years and then as a Senior Counsel of the IMF's Legal Department (Financial and Fiscal Law Unit), where she advised on financial sector reforms in the context of the IMF's surveillance, lending and technical assistance activities. She had over 25 years of experience working in various capacities in Ghana, Japan, South Africa, and the United Kingdom when she was the second female to be 2nd Deputy Governor of the Bank of Ghana. She was appointed in February 2018 by Nana Addo Dankwa Akufo-Addo

=== Deputy Governor of the Central Bank of Ghana ===
She is currently the Second Deputy Governor of the Bank of Ghana, becoming the second woman to occupy the position after 29 years when the first woman Vice-Governor, Nana Oye Mansa Yeboaa was appointed. President Nana Addo Dankwa Akufo-Addo's appointment was made after thorough consultations with the Council of State. She replaced Dr. Johnson Asiama who resigned from the position in January 2018. Prior to her appointment, there were multiple sources tipping Mrs. Josephine Anan-Ankomah, then Managing Director of Ecobank Gambia and now, Managing Director of Ecobank Kenya and Group Executive for the CESA region as a possible replacement for Dr. Johnson Asiama when he resigned.

In February 2022, President Nana Addo Dankwa Akufo-Addo re-appointed Elsie Addo for another 4-year term. Elsie Addo has oversight of the Bank of Ghana’s regulation and supervision of banks and other financial institutions, the macro-prudential function, and other key operational functions.

In March 2022, she gave a speech at the UNCDF International Women's Day.

In April 2022, she also gave a speech at the Ghana Employers' Association's first annual leadership conference.

=== Banking Sector Clean-up ===
Elsie Addo came onto the scene in February 2018 after the Central Bank of Ghana initiated measures in 2017 to clean up the banking sector. This led to the closure of two banks and the resolution of several other banks. She has reiterated that the Bank of Ghana does not collapse banks but its owner does and its responsibility is to license and supervise financial institutions and when they fail, take them out in a manner that does not affect the system. The second deputy Governor of the Bank of Ghana has indicated that the banking sector remains robust, solvent and liquid after the clean-up exercise and recapitalization of banks.

In the midst of declining inflation, she has appealed to banks especially Commercial Banks to cut down on lending rates to reflect inflation rate. According to the Second Deputy Governor of the Bank of Ghana, the banking sector clean-up exercise saved over 3,500 jobs.

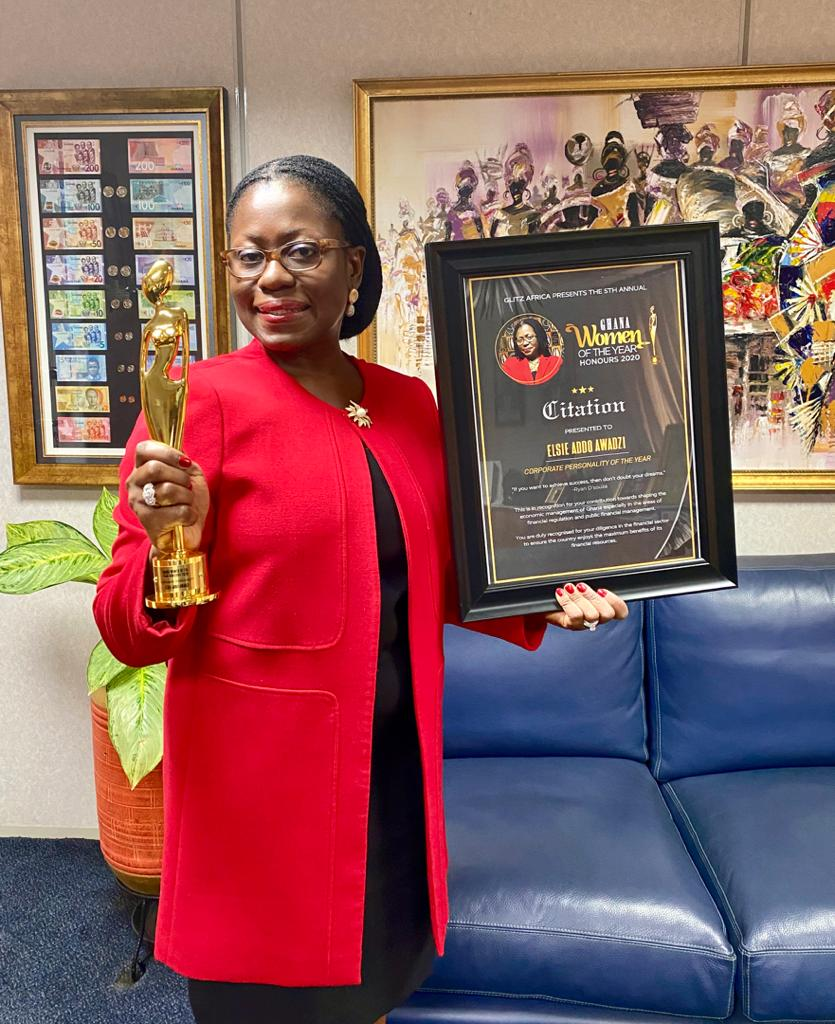

=== Awards ===
In 2020, she was awarded at the 5th Ghana Women of Excellence Awards because of her contribution to Ghana's economic development which was part of the 2020 International Women's Day celebrations.

Mrs. Elsie was also awarded the Glitz Africa Corporate Personality of the Year Award at the 2020 edition of the Ghana Women Honours event. At that event, she was honored for her sterling contribution towards shaping the economic management in Ghana, especially in the area of financial Regulations and Public Financial Management.

== Works ==
She is the author of the following works:

- Designing Legal Frameworks for Public Debt Management
- Resolution Frameworks for Islamic Banks
- Private law underpinnings of public

== Hobbies ==
Elsie Addo enjoys spending time with her family and her friends. She also likes reading and listening to music.
