= International Forum of Sovereign Wealth Funds =

Nonprofit international organisation

- Abbreviation: IFSWF
- Formation: 2009; 17 years ago
- Type: International organisation
- Purpose: Sovereign wealth funds
- Headquarters: London, UK
- Location: St Clements House
- Members: 37 (2023)
- CEO: Duncan Bonfield
- Website: ifswf.org

The International Forum of Sovereign Wealth Funds (IFSWF) is a nonprofit international group of sovereign wealth funds managers which was established in 2009. It is based in London, England.

== History ==
In 2009, a group of 23 leading state-owned international investors from around the world established the IFSWF's precursor, the International Working Group of Sovereign Wealth Funds, following discussions with global groups such as the G20, IMF, and the U.S. Department of Treasury in 2007 and 2008. The Working Group created a set of Generally Accepted Principles and Practices, better known as the "Santiago Principles", for sovereign wealth funds' institutional governance and risk-management frameworks. Following the Kuwait Declaration in 2009, the International Working Group became the IFSWF with the mandate of helping members implement the Principles.

== Overview ==
As of February 2026 IFSWF had 38 members, including some of the world's largest sovereign wealth funds, like the China Investment Corporation, Kuwait Investment Authority, and the Abu Dhabi Investment Authority. It was set up by the funds, so they could come together and create an organisation to promote best practice within their field. Its focus is "to exchange views on issues of common interest and to facilitate an understanding of sovereign wealth funds' activities and of the Santiago Principles".

The 24 Santiago Principles are a voluntary standard of best practice principles and practices endorsed by the IFSWF members for the management of the Sovereign Wealth Funds. Its member funds collectively have about $5.5 trillion under management, representing 80% of assets managed by sovereign funds globally.

When established the IFSWF formalized a limited number of partnerships with world-leading financial and academic partners. The inaugural meeting of IFSWF was held in Baku, Azerbaijan, and it was hosted by the State Oil Fund of Azerbaijan and the government of Azerbaijan. In 2016, the IFSWF and Standards Board for Alternative Investments establish a mutual observer relationship to share knowledge and experience with the objective to raise Standards in the financial industry.

Looking at the most recently published accounts at Companies House, IFSWF Limited made a net profit of £176,758 GBP as of December 31, 2015. This included a nonrefundable capital transfer from the IMF in relation to accumulated membership fees of £884,194 GBP. The accounts are generated in accordance with the International Financial Reporting Standards.

== Members ==
As of February 2026, there were 39 full members and seven associate members of IFSWF.

Name	Government	Member Type
Abu Dhabi Investment Authority	United Arab Emirates	Full
Agaciro Development Fund	Rwanda	Full
Alaska Permanent Fund	Alaska, USA	Full
Bpifrance	France	Full
Budgetary Income Stabilization Fund	Mexico	Full
CDP Equity	Italy	Full
China Investment Corporation	China	Full
Compañía Española de Financiación del Desarrollo	Spain	Full
Fondo de Ahorro de Panamá	Panama	Full
Fonds de Réserve Constitutionnel	Monaco	Full
Fonds Souverain dʻInvestissements Stratégiques	Senegal	Full
Fundo Soberano de Angola	Angola	Full
Future Fund	Australia	Full
Ghana Petroleum Funds	Ghana	Full
GIC	Singapore	Full
Growthfund	Greece	Full
Indonesia Investment Authority	Indonesia	Full
Intergenerational Trust Fund for the People of the Republic of Nauru	Nauru	Full
Investment Corporation of Dubai	United Arab Emirates	
Ireland Strategic Investment Fund	Ireland	Full
Ithmar Capital	Morocco	Full
JSC National Investment Corporation of the National Bank of Kazakhstan	Kazakhstan	Full
Khazanah Nasional	Malaysia	Full
Korea Investment Corporation	South Korea	Full
Kuwait Investment Authority	Kuwait	Full
Libyan Investment Authority	Libya	Full
Mubadala Investment Company	United Arab Emirates	Full
New Zealand Superannuation Fund	New Zealand	Full
Nigeria Sovereign Investment Authority	Nigeria	Full
Oman Investment Authority	Oman	Full
Palestine Investment Fund	Palestine	Full
Qatar Investment Authority	Qatar	Full
State Oil Fund of Azerbaijan	Azerbaijan	Full
The Heritage and Stabilization Fund	Trinidad and Tobago	Full
Pula Fund	Botswana	Full
The Sovereign Fund of Egypt	Egypt	Full
Timor-Leste Petroleum Fund	Timor-Leste	Full
Türkiye Wealth Fund	Turkey	Full
Ethiopian Investment Holdings	Ethiopia	Associate
Fórum de Fundos Soberanos Brasileiros	Brazil	Associate
Future Heritage Fund	Mongolia	Associate
Maharlika Investment Corporation	Philippines	Associate
National Investment and Infrastructure Fund	India	Associate
Natural Resource Fund	Guyana	Associate
Sarawak Sovereign Wealth Future Fund	Malaysia	Associate
Danantara	Indonesia	Full

== See also ==
- International standard
- Standards organization
- Sovereign Wealth Fund Institute
