= Jephthah Comprehensive Secondary School =

Location
- Ozuoba, Port Harcourt, Rivers State; Nigeria
- 4.87086°N 6.96399°E

Information
- Type: mixed
- Motto: Knowledge, Truth and Light
- Religious affiliation: Christian
- Established: 1995 by Mrs Ifeoma Chukwuogo Campus = Boarding
- Enrollment: Representative. Must come to school
- Colours: Blue, White, Black and Red
- Mascot: soldier
- Website: www.jcss.ng

Jephthah Comprehensive Secondary School is located in Ozuoba, Port Harcourt, Nigeria. It was formed by Mrs Ifeoma Chukwuogo on 6 October 1995.
