= Bisi Onasanya =

Group Managing Director/CEO, First Bank of Nigeria Limited
- In office June 2009 – December 2015
- Preceded by: Sanusi Lamido Sanusi
- Succeeded by: Adesola Kazeem Adeduntan

Managing Director, First Pension Custodian Limited
- In office October 2005 – December 2008
- Succeeded by: Kunle Jinadu

Personal details
- Born: Stephen Olabisi Onasanya; August 18, 1961 (age 65) Ibadan, Oyo State, Nigeria
- Profession: Banker

Olabisi “Bisi” Stephen Onasanya (born August 18, 1961) is a former Group Managing Director and Chief Executive Officer of First Bank of Nigeria Limited. Before this appointment, he served as Managing Director and Chief Executive Officer of First Pension Custodian. He began his career with Arthur Young, an American audit firm. A chartered accountant, Onasanya is credited with pioneering initiatives in Nigeria’s nascent pension custody industry that helped define best industry practices.

At First Bank Nigeria Limited, where he held diverse portfolios before he was appointed Group Managing Director, he coordinated the bank’s Century 2 Enterprise Transformation Project, widely acknowledged as one of the most important phases of the bank’s early transformation initiatives in response to an increasingly competitive financial services landscape.

A Fellow of the Institute of Chartered Accountants of Nigeria, a Member of the Chartered Institute of Bankers of Nigeria, and an Associate Member of the Nigerian Institute of Taxation, Onasanya has served as a member of the Chartered Institute of Bankers’ Sub-Committee on Fiscal & Monetary Policies, and of the Presidential Committee on Reduction of Interest Rates.

== Early life ==
Born in Ibadan, the Oyo State capital, Onasanya hails from the Onasanya Family in Ijebu Land, Ogun State. He grew up in Lagos, Nigeria’s commercial capital, where he attended St Paul’s Anglican Primary School (Mushin), Eko Boys High School (Mushin), and the then Lagos State College of Science and Technology. He is the eldest of four children from his mother, and the third of his father’s children.

== Career ==
=== Wema Bank ===
Onasanya joined Wema Bank as a senior accountant in 1985, and over nine years, he rose to become Head of Accounts.

=== First Pension Custodian ===
Onasanya spent three years (October 2005 to December 2008) as Managing Director/Chief Executive Officer of First Pension Custodian. Incorporated by the First Bank Group in response to reforms to the Nigerian pension industry which saw the actuarial system move from a “defined benefit” to a "defined contribution" basis, Onasanya took First Pension Custodian from the application stage through authorisation by the industry regulator. Thereafter, he successfully established it as the sector leader in the Nigerian pension custody market.

The company broke even with almost N400 billion in pension assets under management by the time he left in 2008.

=== First Bank ===
Onasanya spent 21 years with First Bank of Nigeria Limited until his retirement in December 2015 (barring the 3 years when he helped set up First Pension Custodian). Joining First Bank as a Senior Manager, he then held several positions, including that of Group Head, Finance and Performance Management Department. From his period as Chief Executive at First Pension Custodian, he returned to First Bank as an Executive Director, Banking Operations & Services, then rose to become Chief Executive Officer, the position he held until his retirement.

Onasanya retired as Group Managing Director/CEO, First Bank of Nigeria Limited, on 31 December 2015. He is currently the chairman/CEO of his real estate business, the Address Homes Limited.
