= Nigeria Sovereign Investment Authority =

Sovereign wealth fund of Nigeria

- Industry: Institutional investment (sovereign wealth fund)
- Founded: 2011
- Headquarters: Abuja, Nigeria
- Key people: Aminu Umar-Sadiq – Managing Director & Chief Executive Officer; Olusegun Ogunsanya – Chairman of the Board of Directors
- Total equity: US$2.4 billion (December 2024)
- Divisions: Stabilisation Fund; Future Generations Fund; Nigeria Infrastructure Fund
- Website: https://nsia.com.ng

The Nigeria Sovereign Investment Authority is a Nigerian establishment which manages the Nigeria sovereign wealth fund, into which the surplus income produced from Nigeria's excess oil reserves is deposited. This sovereign wealth fund was founded for the purpose of managing and investing these funds on behalf of the government of Nigeria. The fund was established by the Nigeria Sovereign Investment Authority (Establishment, etc.) Act 2011, signed in May 2011, and commenced operations in October 2012 . It is intended to invest the savings gained on the difference between the budgeted and actual market prices for oil to earn returns that would benefit future generations of Nigerians. The fund was allocated an initial US$1 billion in seed capital, and, an additional $0.60billion has been contributed to date by the current administration. In December 2024, the fund has US$2.4 billion in assets under management.

== History ==
Nigeria is the most populous country on the African continent with an estimated 203,452,505 million people. It is also one of the largest producers of oil, on which the majority of its economy relies. Petroleum exports account for approximately 90 percent of its foreign revenue and 80 percent of government revenue. Given Nigeria's dependence on oil, its economy is susceptible to shifts in oil prices.

Excess oil reserves were previously allocated to the Excess Crude Account (ECA), which was set up in 2004 as a stabilisation fund to meet the country's yearly budget deficits and to contribute to the development of local infrastructure. The constitutionality of the ECA has been brought into question.

Nigeria's SWF was brought into law in 2011 via the Nigeria Sovereign Investment Authority Act and is expected to replace the ECA. The act authorized the establishment of the Nigeria Sovereign Investment Authority, giving it jurisdiction over the country's excess petroleum reserves. The fund is intended as security against future economic instability, to contribute towards the development of the country's infrastructure and as a savings mechanism for future generations, using the country's excess oil revenues. It is also expected that managing these reserve funds will help to protect Nigeria's economy from external shocks. With an initial financing of US$1bn USD from the Nigerian government, the fund is the third largest in Sub-Saharan Africa, after Botswana and Angola.

In 2014, NSIA established the subsidiaries NSIA Motorways Company Limited, NSIA Power Investment Company Limited, NSIA Health-care Investment Company Limited and NSIA Real Estates Investment Company Limited.

Mr. Aminu Umar-Sadiq was appointed managing director and chief executive officer of the NSIA on Friday, 30 September 2022. He replaces Mr. Uche Orji, the pioneer managing director and chief executive officer who served out two terms in office, leading the NSIA for a decade. The new managing director will be supported by Mrs. Olubisi Makoju who was appointed executive director, Operations and Corporate Service and Mr. Kolawole Owodunni, appointed executive director, Investments. The new management team began their tenure at the expiration of the tenure of the former Executive Management with effect from 20 September 2022.

Prior to the current Management team, Uche Orji was appointed as the pioneer managing director and chief executive officer of the NSIA on 2 October 2012. He was appointed alongside Alhaji Mahey Rasheed who served as the chairman of the inaugural board of directors, Mrs Stella Ojekwe Onyeji as executive director and Chief Risk Officer (later expanded to Chief Operating Officer) and Mr. Hanspeter Ackermann, the Chief Investment Officer. The inaugural board was inaugurated on 9 October 2012. The firm, JP Morgan, was appointed as the custodian of the funds.

The second board of the Authority led by Mr. Jide Zeitlin as its Chairman operated from 12 May 2017 to 11 May 2021 while the current Board is led by Mr. Farouk Gumel who assumed the Chairmanship on Wednesday 1 September 2021.

The NSIA was invited to request observer status at the International Forum of Sovereign Wealth Funds (IFSWF), with the intention of eventual membership. The Authority was due to present its credentials at an October 2013 meeting in Oslo, Norway. As a member of the IFSWF the fund has signed up to the Santiago Principles on best practices for managing Sovereign Wealth Funds and publishes a self-assessment on how it adopts and implements the principles within its governance procedures. In 2020 the fund had US$3.56 billion in assets under management.

== Three funds ==
The fund is composed of three distinct funds or windows, each with specific investment and development objectives. Of the initial $1bn, 85 percent of the funds will be distributed among the three windows with an initial 15 percent or $150 million remaining unallocated, to be assigned to either of the three funds as needed in the future. The funds will be invested in various securities. The Stabilisation Fund was allocated an initial 20 percent, while 32.5 percent each went to the Future Generation and the Nigeria Infrastructure funds.

The Stabilisation Fund is intended to safeguard against budgetary deficits. It would be a last resort from which government may withdraw annually to meet shortfalls in the budget brought about by falls in oil prices or other budgetary constraints.

The Future Generation Fund is a savings fund that will seek investment in long-term investments and assets to provide savings for future generations of Nigerians.

The Nigeria Infrastructure Fund is expected to secure investments in the infrastructural development of the country in areas such as agriculture and other government directed projects.

== Board of Directors ==
The NSIA is governed by a Board of Directors that manages the business of the Authority. Since its establishment, it has adopted several strategies to maintain the knowledge, skills, and experience necessary to achieve this.

The board of directors is composed of the members listed below:

- Farouk Mohammed Gumel – Chairman
- Aminu Umar-Sadiq – Managing Director & Chief Executive Officer
- Prof Chikolo Vandu – Non-executive Director & Chairman of the Investments Committee
- Mallam Ali Goni Kadugum – Non-executive Director & Chairman of the Finance & General-Purpose Committee
- Kabir Suleiman Oniyangi – Non-executive Director
- Ogechi Paschal-Ejiogu – Non-executive Director
- Babatunde Emmanuel Sobamowo – Non-executive Director
- Olubisi Makoju – Executive Director of Operations and Corporate Services
- Kola Owodunni – Executive Director of Investments

== See also ==
- List of countries by sovereign wealth funds
- Sovereign wealth fund § Largest sovereign wealth funds
