= Sovereign Wealth Fund Institute =

American financial services company

Sovereign Wealth Fund Institute, Inc.
- Company type: Private
- Founded: 2008; 18 years ago
- Headquarters: US
- Number of locations: Worldwide
- Area served: Global
- Key people: Michael Maduell (CEO); Karen Maduell (COO); Lakshmi Narayanan (Chairman)
- Products: Research and Data Subscriptions, Publications, Datafeeds, APIs, Events, Consulting
- Website: www.swfinstitute.org

The Sovereign Wealth Fund Institute (also SWF Institute, or simply SWFI) is an American corporation that analyzes public asset owners such as sovereign wealth funds and other long-term governmental investors. Initially focused solely on sovereign wealth funds, the Sovereign Wealth Fund Institute has branched out to cover all types of public institutional investors. The institute sells its subscription and API/datafeed services as a financial data vendor but provides information to the media as well.

Incorporated in 2008, it was founded by Michael Maduell and shortly he brought in Carl Linaburg, who then left the organization in 2017. In late 2022, Lakshmi Narayanan of the Patel Family Office was named Chairman of SWFI.

SWFI sells its research and data via subscriptions to asset managers, banks, researchers, universities, governments, institutional investors, asset owners, corporations, law firms and other entities.

In 2020, SWFI started to initiate coverage over family office sector and wealth management firms.

== Transparency ratings ==
The SWFI came out with the Linaburg-Maduell Transparency Index in 2008. It is a 10-point scale based on ten principles of transparency, each adding one point to the index rating. The index is used by sovereign wealth funds in their annual reports.

== Data ==
The SWFI tracks direct deals in sovereign wealth funds, pensions, asset owners, and other entities. The value of global direct deals by sovereign-wealth funds hit $50.02 billion in the first half of 2014.

SWFI tracks the assets of the following types but not limited:

- sovereign wealth fund
- pension
- endowment
- family office
- wealth manager
- financial holding company
- foundation
- central bank
- bank
- venture capital
- asset manager
- other entities

Norway's sovereign wealth fund crossed $1 trillion in assets in 2017.

== See also ==
- International Forum of Sovereign Wealth Funds
