= First Bank of Nigeria =

Nigerian multinational bank

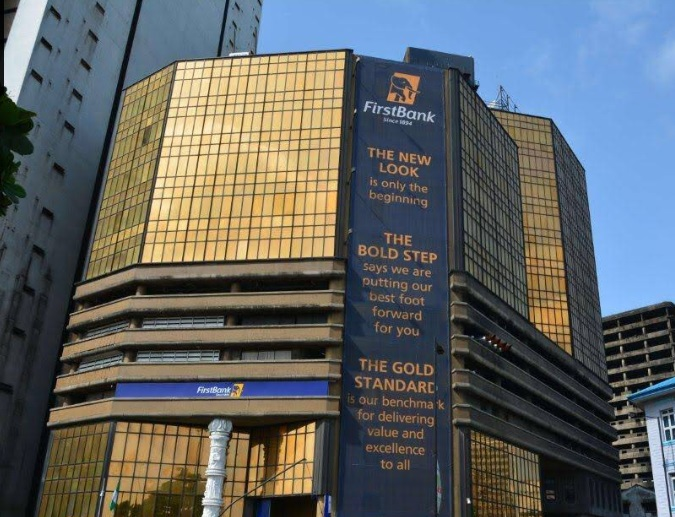
- Headquarters of the bank
- Type: Private bank
- Industry: Finance
- Founded: 1894 (as Bank of British West Africa); 1979 (renamed First Bank of Nigeria)
- Founder: Sir Alfred Jones, K.C.M.G
- Headquarters: 35 Marina, Lagos, Lagos State, Nigeria
- Number of locations: Over 820 business outlets (2024)
- Key people: Olusegun Alebiosu, CEO
- Products: Financial services
- Revenue: ▲₦70.8 billion
- Operating income: ₦294.4 billion
- Net income: ₦62.7 billion
- Total assets: ₦27.4 trillion
- Number of employees: 16,000
- Website: www.firstbanknigeria.com

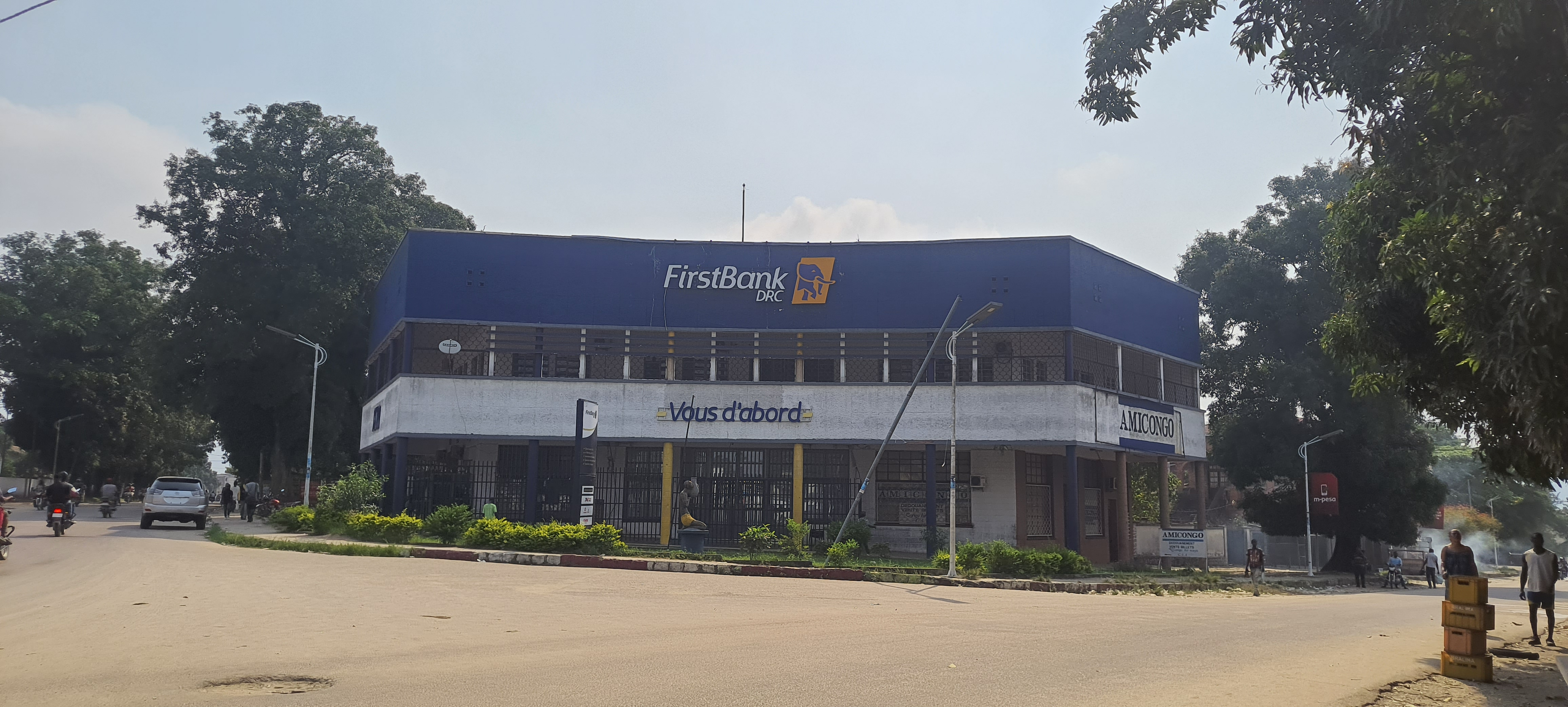
Branch in D.R. of Congo

First Bank of Nigeria is a multinational bank and financial services company with headquarters in Lagos, Nigeria. First Bank was founded in 1894 by Sir Alfred Jones and is currently owned by First HoldCo PLC, which in itself has diversified ownership with over 1.3 million shareholders.

== Overview ==
The First Bank Group has over 820 business locations across Africa and has an agent banking network with over 233,500 locations across Nigeria as of 2024. The bank specializes in retail banking, with a client base in West Africa of over 42 million customers.

First Bank, as a group, employs over 16,000 staff. It operates four key strategic business units: retail banking, corporate banking, commercial banking, and public sector banking.

As of 2024, the bank which is a part of the holding company FirstHoldCo has an asset size of N27.4 trillion. The bank as at September 2024, released its financial statement for 9M of the year, reporting a pre-tax profit that stood at N610.9 billion

== Subsidiaries ==
The subsidiaries of First Bank of Nigeria include the following:

- FirstBank (DRC), Formerly Banque International de Credit (BIC) – Kinshasa, Democratic Republic of the Congo (75% shareholding), is a subsidiary of First Bank of Nigeria Limited and was until September 2014 called BIC, which was founded in April 1994
- FBN Bank (China)—Beijing, China—representative office
- FirstBank (Ghana) – Accra, Ghana – 100% shareholding
- FirstBank (Guinea) – Conakry, Guinea – 100% shareholding
- FBN Bank (Senegal) – Dakar – 100% shareholding
- FirstBank (Sierra Leone) – Freetown, Sierra Leone – 100% shareholding
- FBN Bank (South Africa): Johannesburg, South Africa – representative office
- FBN Bank (UAE) – Abu Dhabi, United Arab Emirates – representative office
- FirstBank (UK) – London, United Kingdom – 100% shareholding – savings products sold under FirstSave brand
- FBN Bank (UK/Paris)—Paris, France—a branch of the subsidiary in the UK
- First Pension Custodian Nigeria Limited
- FBN Mortgages Limited
- FirstBank (Gambia)

== FBN Holdings ==
In 2010, the Central Bank of Nigeria revised the regulation covering the scope of banking activities for Nigerian banks. The universal banking model was discontinued, and banks were required to divest from non-core banking businesses or adopt a holding company structure. FirstBank opted to form a holding company, FBN Holdings Plc., to capture synergies across its already established banking and non-banking businesses. The new structure resulted in a stronger platform to support the group's future growth ambitions domestically and internationally.

FBN Quest is the brand name of the merchant banking and asset management businesses of FBN Holdings Plc, which comprises FBNQuest Merchant Bank, FBN Quest Capital Limited, FBN Quest Securities Limited, FBN Quest Capital Asset Management Limited, FBN Quest Trustees Limited, FBN Quest Funds Limited, and FBN Capital Partners Limited.

== History ==
The bank was founded in 1894 and is Nigeria's oldest bank. It converted to a public company in 1970 and was listed on the Nigerian Stock Exchange (NSE) in 1971. However, as part of the implementation of the non-operating holding company structure, it was delisted from the NSE and replaced with FBN Holdings Plc. in 2012.

It was previously structured as an operating holding company before the implementation of a non-operating holding company structure (FBN Holdings) in 2011/2012.

=== Pre-independence ===
First Bank commenced business in 1894 in what were then British-controlled areas as the Bank of British West Africa. The bank originally served British shipping and trading agencies in Nigeria. The founder, Alfred Lewis Jones, was a shipping magnate who originally had a monopoly on importing silver currency into West Africa through his Elder Dempster shipping company. According to its founder, without a bank economies were reduced to using barter and a wide variety of mediums of exchange, leading to unsound practices. A bank could provide a secure home for deposits and also a uniform medium of exchange. The bank primarily financed foreign trade, but did little lending to indigenous Nigerians, who had little to offer as collateral for loans.

=== Post-independence ===
After Nigeria's independence in 1960, the bank began to extend more credit to indigenous Nigerians. At the same time, citizens began to trust British banks since there was an independent financial control mechanism and more citizens began to patronize the new Bank of West Africa.

In 1965, Standard Bank acquired the Bank of West Africa and changed its acquisition's name to Standard Bank of West Africa. In 1969, Standard Bank of West Africa incorporated its Nigerian operations under the name Standard Bank of Nigeria. In 1971, Standard Bank of Nigeria listed its shares on the Nigerian Stock Exchange and placed 13% of its share capital with Nigerian investors. After the end of the Nigerian Civil War, Nigeria's military government sought to increase local control of the retail-banking sector. In response, Standard Chartered Bank reduced its stake in Standard Bank Nigeria to 38%. Once it had lost majority control, Standard Chartered wished to signal that it was no longer responsible for the bank and the bank changed its name to First Bank of Nigeria Limited in 1979. By then, the bank had re-organized and had more Nigerian directors than ever.

In 1991 the bank changed its name to First Bank of Nigeria Plc following listing on the Nigerian Stock Exchange. In 2012, the Bank changed its name again to First Bank of Nigeria Limited as part of a restructuring resulting in FBN Holdings Plc, having detached its commercial business from other businesses in the First Bank Group, in line with the requirements of the Central Bank of Nigeria. The bank had 1.3 million shareholders globally, was quoted on the Nigerian Stock Exchange (NSE), where it was one of the most capitalized companies and also had an unlisted Global Depository Receipt (GDR) programme, all of which were transferred to its holding company FBN Holdings in December 2012.

In 1982 the bank opened a branch in London, which it converted into a subsidiary, FBN Bank (UK), in 2002. Its most recent international expansion was the opening in 2004 of a representative office in Johannesburg, South Africa. In 2005 it acquired FBN (Merchant Bankers) Ltd. Paribas and MBC International Bank Ltd, a group of Nigerian investors, had founded MBC in 1982 as a merchant bank, and it became a commercial bank in 2002.

In June 2009, Stephen Olabisi Onasanya was appointed group managing director/chief executive officer, replacing Sanusi Lamido Sanusi, who had been appointed governor of the Central Bank of Nigeria. Onasanya was formerly executive director of banking operations & services. He retired on 31 December 2015 and Adesola Adeduntan took over as managing director/chief executive officer, effective 1 January 2016, with Gbenga Shobo as deputy managing director.

In April 2021, the Central Bank of Nigeria fired the whole board of the First Bank of Nigeria which was in a «grave financial condition».

=== Key milestones ===
- 1894 – Incorporated and headquartered in Marina, Lagos, Nigeria, West Africa's commercial nerve centre.
- 1912 – Calabar branch, the second branch in Nigeria, was opened by King Jaja of Opobo; Zaria branch was also opened as the first branch in northern Nigeria.
- 1947 – FirstBank advanced the first long-term loan to the then colonial government, followed in 1955 by a partnership with the government to expand the railway lines.
- 1971 – First listing on the Nigerian Stock Exchange (NSE).
- 1991 – First Automated Teller Machine (ATM) introduced at 35 Marina as part of convenient, online real time banking.
- 1994 – Launched first university endowment programme in Nigeria.
- 2002 – Established FBN UK regulated by the FSA, the first Nigerian Bank to wholly own a full-fledged bank in the UK.
- 2004 – Launched a new brand identity which introduced substantial changes in the look and feel of the FirstBank brand.
- 2007 – Introduced Finnone credit administration software as the first bank in Africa to pioneer the service.
- 2011 – Launched the first biometric ATM and cash deposit ATM in Nigeria.
- 2012 – Became a subsidiary group of FBN Holdings Plc.
- 2013 – Completed the acquisition of ICB asset in Guinea, Gambia, Sierra Leone and Ghana as part of an ongoing Pan African expansion program.
- 2014 – Initiated, at 120 years, the launch of a new corporate identity.
- 2016 – Launched FirstLounge, the first landside lounge at Murtala Muhammed International Airport.

=== Awards ===
- “Best Private Bank in Nigeria” by World Finance Magazine seven times
- "Best Retail Bank in Nigeria" (2011–2018) by The Asian Banker
- 21 on the list of "The Best 100 Companies to Work For" by Jobberman Nigeria
- 5 on the list "Best Workplace in the Large Corporates Category"

== Leadership ==
- Chairman – Ebenezer Olufowose
- Managing Director/CEO – Olusegun Alebiosu
- Deputy Managing Director - Ini Ebong
- Executive Director, Corporate Banking – Oluwatosin Adewuyi
- Executive Director – Patrick Iyamabo.
- Executive Director, Retail Banking (South) Division – Oluseyi Oyefeso

== See also ==
- List of banks in Nigeria
- Economy of Nigeria
- International Commercial Bank
