= Santiago Principles =

Guidelines for sovereign wealth funds

The Santiago Principles or formally the Sovereign Wealth Funds: Generally Accepted Principles and Practices (GAPP) are designed as a common global set of 24 voluntary guidelines that assign best practices for the operations of Sovereign Wealth Funds (SWFs). They are a consequence of the concern of investors and regulators to establish management principles addressing the inadequate transparency, independence, and governance in the industry. They are guidelines to be followed by sovereign wealth fund management to maintain a stable global financial system, proper controls around risk, regulation and a sound governance structure.

As of 2016 30 funds have formally signed up to the Principles and joined the IFSWF representing collectively 80% of assets managed by sovereign funds globally or US$5.5 trillion.

The principles are maintained and promoted by the International Forum of Sovereign Wealth Funds (IFSWF) and whose membership have to either have implemented or aspire to implement the principles.

== History ==
In 2008, there was growing concern by investors and regulators about SWFs, partially about their visibility, accountability, and governance structure. To address these concerns, a joint effort between the International Monetary Fund (IMF) and the "International Working Group of Sovereign Wealth Funds" (IWG-SWF) which represented the coming together of 14 principle funds including some of the largest, such as GIC Private Limited and Abu Dhabi Investment Authority. The IWG-SWF then drafted the 24 Santiago Principles, to set out common international standards regarding transparency, independence, and governance which SWFs might follow. These were made public after being presented to the IMF International Monetary Financial Committee on 11 October 2008.

The working group was then replaced by a permanent body on the 6 April 2009, the "International Forum of Sovereign Wealth Funds" to maintain and promote the new standards going forward and encourage other sovereign wealth fund to sign up.

Natural resource-rich developing economies are typically encouraged to adopt good governance standards for sovereign wealth funds, such as the Santiago Principles, which emphasize transparency, accountability, and sound investment practices. This approach is often preferred over local content policies, which can foster corruption and rent-seeking behavior in contexts with weak governance.

== Overview ==
According to the IFSWF, the creation of the Santiago Principles was driven by the following goals for SWFs:

- To help maintain a stable global financial system and free flow of capital and investment;
- To comply with all applicable regulatory and disclosure requirements in the countries in which they invest;
- To ensure that SWFs invest on the basis of economic and financial risk and return-related considerations; and
- To ensure that SWFs have in place a transparent and sound governance structure that provides adequate operational controls, risk management, and accountability.

== 24 principles ==
The Santiago Principles state that SWFs need to have the following:

1. A sound legal framework,
2. A well-defined mission,
3. Domestic activities coordinated with fiscal and monetary authorities,
4. Clearly defined rules for drawdowns,
5. Transparency to the owner,
6. Clear division of roles,
7. Governing bodies appointed in a predetermined manner,
8. Governing bodies that act in the best interest of the SWF,
9. Independence,
10. Formal definition of accountability,
11. Annual reporting,
12. Independent auditors,
13. Ethics and professionalism,
14. Rules-based outsourcing,
15. Ability to abide by rules of foreign countries,
16. Operational independence from the owner,
17. Public transparency,
18. Clear investment policies,
19. Commercial orientation,
20. Restrictions against using privileged information,
21. Shareholder rights policies,
22. Effective risk management,
23. Proper reporting of performance,
24. And regular reviews to ensure its compliance with the foregoing Santiago Principles.

== See also ==
- International standard
- Standards organization
