= 2015 in Angola =

- Centuries: 20th; 21st
- Decades: 1990s; 2000s; 2010s; 2020s
- See also: List of years in Angola

This article lists events from the year 2015 in Angola.

== Incumbents ==
- President: José Eduardo dos Santos
- Vice president: Manuel Vicente

== Events ==
- Opening of the Calueque Dam.
- Opening of the Luau International Airport.

=== Sport ===
- 2015 C.D. Primeiro de Agosto season

== Deaths ==
- March – Raúl Correia Mendes, television journalist and filmmaker (b. 1949).

== Links ==
Media related to 2015 in Angola at Wikimedia Commons
