= Corruption in Angola =

Corruption in Angola refers to the pervasive and long-standing issue of corruption within the country's government and public institutions. The aftermath of the 30-year civil war and the influence of the Soviet command economy have resulted in significant institutional damage and the emergence of a centralized government with authoritarian tendencies. This has allowed the president and his associates to exert control over the nation's resources, enabling them to exploit the economy for personal gain through legal and extra-legal means.

== Background ==
Angola's former president, José Eduardo dos Santos (1979-2017), has been accused of creating one of the most corrupt countries in Africa. He had relatively weak response to the everyday needs and concerns of citizens and has instead leveraged the country's oil wealth to accumulate a massive fortune for himself and his family. The president's children, leading government officials and military officers have become incredibly wealthy, while much of the country's people live in poverty lacking access to basic services.

In Angola's early post-independence history, most of these strategies involved the oil sector or the spending revenues legally derived from the oil sector, over time corruption evolved into a variety of schemes involving companies controlled by the party elite and their patronage networks that operate in all sectors of the economy. Systemic corruption is possible on this scale because all the vital organs of the state (military, police, judiciary, legislature, bureaucracy, and media) are operated by those who prioritize their private interests within the patronage system over the responsibilities of their public position.

== Corruption indices ==
1. Transparency International's 2025 Corruption Perceptions Index gave Angola a score of 32 on a scale from 0 ("highly corrupt") to 100 ("very clean"). When ranked by score, Angola ranked 120th among the 182 countries in the Index, where the country ranked first is perceived to have the most honest public sector. For comparison with regional scores, the best score among sub-Saharan African countries (Note: Angola, Benin, Botswana, Burkina Faso, Burundi, Cameroon, Cape Verde, Central African Republic, Chad, Comoros, Côte d'Ivoire, Democratic Republic of the Congo, Djibouti, Equatorial Guinea, Eritrea, Eswatini, Ethiopia, Gabon, Gambia, Ghana, Guinea, Guinea-Bissau, Kenya, Lesotho, Liberia, Madagascar, Malawi, Mali, Mauritania, Mauritius, Mozambique, Namibia, Niger, Nigeria, Republic of the Congo, Rwanda, Sao Tome and Principe, Senegal, Seychelles, Sierra Leone, Somalia, South Africa, South Sudan, Sudan, Tanzania, Togo, Uganda, Zambia, and Zimbabwe.) was 68, the average was 32 and the worst was 9. For comparison with worldwide scores, the best score was 89 (ranked 1), the average was 42, and the worst was 9 (ranked 181, in a two-way tie).
2. The 2009 World Bank Worldwide Governance Index, gave Angola very low scores on the six aspects of governance assessed. Political stability improved from 19.2 in 2004 to 35.8 (of 100) in 2009, but Angola scored much lower for accountability, regulatory standards, rule of law, and corruption (5.2).
3. The 2010 Ibrahim Index, Angola ranked 43rd out of 53 sub-Saharan African countries.
4. The 2010 Revenue Watch Institute’s Transparency Index ranked Angola 47th out of 55 countries: scoring 34 out of 100.
5. The 2010 Open Budget Index gave Angola a score of 26 (of 100) on fiscal transparency, a large improvement over its 2004 score of 3, but a far lower score than those of most of the other surveyed countries.
6. In 2008, The Heritage Foundation’s Index of Economic Freedom ranked Angola 161st out of 179 countries, making Angola the seventh least free economy in sub-Saharan Africa. The freedom from corruption score was 19 of 100.
7. Angola is listed on Global Integrity's Grand Corruption Watch List, only 15 other countries have weak enough anti-corruption safeguards to be on this list.

Ranking such as those above are based on perception surveys, their utility is generally questioned because: they measure perception, not occurrences of corruption; the survey questions imprecisely define corruption and provide little guidance about what constitutes high or low levels of corruption; people in different countries answer the previous questions in different ways, limiting the comparability across countries; and the ranking and numerical scale can make countries look further away from one another on the spectrum of corruption than they really are.

== Historical overview ==
Angola's colonial era ended with the Angolan War of Independence against Portugal which occurred between 1970 and 1975. Independence did not produce a unified Angola, however; the country plunged into years of civil war between the National Union for the Total Independence of Angola (UNITA) and the governing Popular Movement for the Liberation of Angola (MPLA). 30 years of war would produce historical legacies that combine to allow for the persistence of a highly corrupt government system.

=== Civil war (1975–1991) ===
The Angolan civil war was fought between the pro-western UNITA and the communist MPLA and had the characteristics typical of a Cold War era proxy war combined with a resource fueled struggle for control of the state apparatus between two rival strongmen. Regional countries were involved according to their Cold war alignment, the MLPA was even supported by Cuban troops. Oil production began to grow, but it was not a significant proportion of government revenue until towards the end of the period, most funding came from Soviet support. The Soviet influence produced a highly centralized and weakly institutionalized government system controlled by a small group of people close to the president. Angola's land, resources, and infrastructure were nationalized during this time, concentrating all of the countries wealth in the state. The war precluded economic development in most of the country, only the oil sector, military, and coastal cities were funded by the state. These consequences would have an enduring effect on Angola's political economy by centralizing the economy around the president and the military and regionalizing economic development. Appropriation of state assets is rumored to have been high during this period, although the limited connection to the international economy combined with an absence of transparency limits the knowledge of details and precision of estimates.

=== 1991–2002 ===
Withdrawal of foreign powers at the end of the Cold War and pressure from the international community led to the 1991 Bicesse Accord: a tentative peace process between the MLPA and UNITA. As a consequence, the Angolan government was forced to begin a process of economic liberalization and transition to democracy. Elections were held in 1992, however UNITA and their leader Jonas Savimbi refused to accept defeat and civil war ensued. The civil war that leveled what was left of the countryside and killed an estimated 1000 people per day between 1992 and 2002 - interrupted somewhat by the Lusaka Peace Protocol on 20 November 1994 - until war resumed in 1998.

While the elections did not bring peace, they did provide the MLPA with international political legitimacy. The MLPA continued to be the recognized government of Angola and maintained access to oil exports and financial markets which provided them with the resources necessary to consolidate control over the new democratic institutions and the newly opened economy. Oil revenues replaced Soviet support as Angola's main source of income during this time, growing to 1 million barrels per day in 2002.

The Cold War era had aggregated control of the Angolan State in a small group; simultaneously, nationalization during that era aggregated ownership of Angola's assets in the State. Combined with the chaos of the war, the MLPA was able to avoid a robust democratization process and instead create a system where the President has a high level of discretion and a low level of accountability with regards to government spending and appointing government positions. These factors allowed for very high levels of corruption during this period of time: direct appropriation of the government budget was common: the IMF estimates that approximately 1 billion dollars per year was appropriated from the state budget during this time. The economic liberalization process was abused to sell state assets (telecom companies, media outlets, large land concessions) to members of the presidential patronage network for a price below market value, such transactions were often funded by loans from the Angolan state or banks.

=== 2002–2018 ===
Peace was achieved in 2002 with the defeat of UNITA, the Luena Memorandum was signed and elections were held in 2008, and a new constitution took effect in 2010. The constitution was drafted without public consultation and implemented without a ratification referendum. The new constitution increased the powers of the president such that there is no true division of powers and he is able to rule by presidential decree.

Angola's oil production grew from 1 million to 2 million barrels per day, while the price of oil increased from the 20-30 dollar range to over $100 per barrel. Consequently, Angola became Africa's 3rd largest economy with a GDP of $120 billion in 2013. The high price of oil had a resource curse like effect: the large profits allowed for considerable appropriation to be obscured behind visible infrastructure projects.

Although oil wealth did insulate Angola from the international leverage, they did face pressure to increase public service provision, create anti-corruption legislation, and improve transparency in the oil and financial sectors. Angola did make such improvements to remain in formal accordance with international norms and maintain access to international markets. These changes were not enforced, however; so no substantial reduction in corruption occurred - it merely took on more complicated forms when international laws necessitated.

The legacies of the previous eras produced a centralized and entrenched patronage system that included all aspects of governance and the economy that have proven to be quite resilient. There are, however, some prospects for change have occurred in recent years. The Angolan government has faced mounting fiscal pressure since the collapse of the price of oil in 2014 reduced Angola's GDP to 89 billion in 2016. The reduced revenues have made debt an issue, created a foreign exchange shortage, caused a currency devaluation and 42% inflation in 2016. The reduction in income has exposed the weakness of the country and produced a growing domestic protest movement in response to deteriorating conditions and further international pressure in response to the increased risk of insolvency in the Banks and Sonangol. Political change also offers some prospect for reform: João Lourenço was elected President in 2017. He has since removed the dos Santos family and other close associates from high level positions and pledged to improve governance and reduce corruption.

== Modes of corruption ==
Corruption occurs when an actor uses a public position to divert resources from the state to private individuals - the practice is systemic in Angola. The president places associates in positions of power in state institutions and enterprises, then they make decisions in their public capacity to allow for a variety of legal and extra-legal opportunities to extract private profit from Angola's economy. Strategies have evolved over time from direct embezzlement of oil revenues, to a variety of schemes involving companies controlled by the party elite and their patronage networks that have consistently appropriated resources from the Angolan state via: control over loans made by state capitalized financial institutions; land and resource concessions; monopolization of business and import licences; granting un-tendered contracts to their own companies; and including unnecessary joint-venture partners and overpaid consultants in the contracts of state-owned enterprises and the government. The magnitude of appropriation was possible and sustainable over such a long period of time because of the centralization of authority in the economy and the vital organs of the state. The powerful actors in these institutions receive access to patronage and govern according to the private interests of the dos Santos Regime.

== Corruption of the state apparatus ==
Observers of Angola generally believe that corruption is endemic throughout the state system. There is much overlap, as well as intimate connections, between government officials and business figures in Angola - resulting in many conflicts of interest. While Angola technically has the institutional and legislative structures typical of a democracy, the normal logic of horizontal accountability and depersonalized decision making in the best interests of the public does not apply - rather, the system has been described as a facade for the international community, whereby the operators of all branches of government collude to allow each other opportunities for private gain.

=== Elections ===
Angola's elections are administered by two agencies: the CNE (Provincial Electoral Commission) is responsible for oversight; and the CIPE (Inter-ministerial Commission for the Preparation of the Elections) is responsible for administering the voting process. In theory there should be an element of horizontal accountability between the two institutions; however, at the federal level both institutions are operated by MLPA insiders and at the district level they are often represented by the same person.

Angola's first elections since the civil war were held in 2008. The Southern African Development Community and the European Commission described Angola's 2008 elections as generally fair, but other observers have cited irregularities and violence as factors that make the elections less than equitable. Registration was limited in rural areas due to the documentation requirements, Angolan expatriates were not able to vote at embassies (despite the Voter Registration Law), and there was an assassination attempt against the leader of the opposition in the months leading up to the election. There were also allegations that the MLPA used their influence over the media to distort public perception in their favour. Prior to the 2008 elections, the MLPA unveiled a series of major infrastructure projects with public events that had the characteristics of a campaign rally while the media simultaneously produced reports accusing UNITA of stockpiling weapons and planning a war.

In the months before the 2017 election, both State owned media outlets and those privately owned by party insiders were used to favorably portray the MLPA and criticize UNITA in a manner similar to the 2008 elections. The elections were subject to allegations of outright falsification. The CNE announced an MLPA victory with 65% of the vote; however, media reports cite anonymous inside sources and allege that this figure was released well before the local voting centers had reported their results. UNITA claimed that it had tabulated the real results based on the vote counts of the local locations and the real result was: 47.6% for the MLPA and 40.2% for UNITA.

=== Bureaucratic corruption ===
Angola's business environment has been described as “one of the most difficult in the world” because of pervasive corruption and cumbersome bureaucratic procedures. Angolan public servants routinely demand bribes, known as “gasosas.”; paying such bribes is an ordinary part of doing business in Angola. The 2018 World Bank Ease of Doing Business Index ranked Angola 175th out of 190 countries. The 2010 World Bank & IFC Enterprise survey found that 75% of firms found corruption to be an impediment to business and that they expected to pay bribes in approximately 50% of their interactions with Angolan officials. Angolan citizens often must also pay bribes to access basic public services such as healthcare, education, vehicle registration, and business permits. Police officers often extort payments at checkpoints.

Interviews with members of the Angolan business community suggest that earning government contracts or acquiring business licences is impossible without connections. This is particularly true where Import Licences are concerned: they are tightly controlled and restricted to the upper levels of the dos Santos network, the MLPA, or the military elite. Angola imports most of its finished products because it has a small manufacturing sector and an export oriented agricultural sector. The consequence of not developing local production capacity and allowing the import of goods to be a protected monopoly is that Angolan cities are among the most expensive in the world, pricing ordinary Angolans out of being able to access products that would otherwise be significantly cheaper.

=== Judicial corruption ===
The function of a judiciary is to impartially enforce the laws of the country and investigate potential violations; however, the Angolan judiciary is known to collaborate with the regime. The President appoints judges, many of whom are or were members of the MLPA or the military. Judges have been known to ignore or creatively interpret laws in situations where they hold a conflict of interest. The system is underfunded, understaffed and inefficient. There is a large backlog of cases and rural Municipal courts are not even operational, obliging citizens to turn to informal, traditional court systems.

The courts have also been used as instruments of repression against political opponents on numerous occasions. Notable examples include: the cases against journalist Rafael Marquis de Morais; a 6-year sentence to Cabindan activist José Marcos Mavungo in 2015; and the book club raids in 2015.

== Sonangol and the oil sector ==
Oil has been Angola's core asset since independence. It has provided the government with a reliable and steadily increasing source of funds (other than instances of oil price volatility). Production rose from 150 000 barrels per day in 1980, to 645 000 bpd in 1995, to 2 million bpd in 2008. Oil currently provides approximately 80% of government revenue, as such it is also a major vehicle for appropriation.

Sonangol, the Angolan state oil company, was created and granted a monopoly over the country's offshore oil by the MLPA in 1976. By 1980, Sonangol had divided Angola's coastal waters into exploration blocks and opened the exploration rights for bidding by international companies. Sonangol then entered into joint ventures with a consortium of companies in each block to extract the oil. Sonangol did not have any offshore oil exploration or extraction capacity, the company simply collected rents by selling the rights to the oil during this time. Sonangol leveraged these partnerships to quickly accumulated wealth and capacities. By 1991, the company had expanded to include many subsidiaries with interests in every aspect of oil production. Despite its opaque finances and relationship to the regime, Sonangol was consistent in its external relationships and had cultivated a reputation as a competent and reliable business partner among the MNCs that are active in the country.

The Angolan oil sector is an archetype of an enclave economy: it is physically removed from Angola, and not dependent on the country for labour, capital, infrastructure or demand. Sonangol and the MLPA managed it like a textbook example of a Rent-seeking Gatekeeper state that is a facade for a presidential patronage network. A proportion of Sonangol's revenue was consistently embezzled each year: rather than move from Sonangol to the Angolan government, billions of dollars simply disappeared. This was possible because: Angola's laws were ignored; the transparency of Sonangol and the government's budget was very low; and, Sonangol had many vaguely defined responsibilities beyond the oil sector that were used as an explanation. Based on a comparison of Angola's oil production against the total state budget the IMF estimates that $32 billion was appropriated in this way between 2007 and 2010.

In addition to direct embezzlement, Sonangol facilitates indirect modes of private appropriation, including: mandating joint ventures with low value added patronage companies; preferential treatment of favored companies during the awarding of exploration and extraction contracts; preferential treatment of its own subsidiaries in the awarding of ancillary service contracts; allowing companies to over charge for services; including unnecessary consultants in their contracts and paying them large fees.

Government policy also enables corruption in the oil sector. The "Angolanisation policy", which began in the 1980s, mandated the employment of Angolans in the Oil sector. In the 1990s it expanded to mandate the participation of Angolan companies in the ancillary aspects of the oil sector, namely well servicing, construction, and general procurement of goods and services. This is widely understood as a mode of rent seeking, as the Angolan companies rarely ever add value to the project or create any jobs. They are simply owned by Angolan officials close to the President that are making use of a law put in place for this purpose.

Another more subtle form of corruption related to Sonangol involves its decision not to develop local refining capacity. Only one refinery is under construction, The Lobito Refinery, and its cost has tripled during the course of the project due to corruption and mismanagement. As a country with so much oil, it is likely that a competitive refining market or an efficient State Owned refiner could provide petroleum derivatives to the Angolan economy at a lower cost than it takes to import them, while simultaneously keeping the profits from this activity in the hands of the government. Instead, Angola has no refining capacity and a joint-venture between Trafigura, a Swiss MNC, and Cochan, a company owned by Vice-President Manuel Vicente (CEO of Sonangol from 1999-2012), General Manuel Dias (“Kopelipa”) and General Leopoldino Fragoso do Nascimento “Dino” has a monopoly on the import of petroleum derivatives. Angola spends approximately $170 million a month importing petroleum derivatives.

The 2014 collapse in oil price revealed the major problems at Sonangol. The dramatic reduction in income put the company in a position where it struggled to meet its financial obligations, and its corruption and questionable accounting practices were exposed. Since 2011 they had been showing a positive balance sheet, but only because they had been re-valuing their assets to obscure poor cash flow. In 2015, the former chairman of Sonangol's board of directors, Francisco Lemos, stated publicly that he believed Sonangol to be bankrupt. They maintained a 300 million dollar outstanding debt with Chevron throughout 2015 and in 2016, the China Development Bank suspended Sonangol's line of credit after they failed to deliver a shipment of oil.

In June 2016, President dos Santos appointed his daughter, Isabel dos Santos, as a CEO of Sonangol. This presented a tremendous conflict of interest as she was politically connected and in control of other companies that were shareholders, debtors, creditors, suppliers, and customers of Sonangol. She engaged in number of corrupt activities during her tenure. She prioritized a $1 billion loan repayment to the Trafigura-Cochane joint venture that she is party to over other obligations. She also used her position to grant an exclusive supply contract for Sonangol's food purchases to her supermarket - Candando. She also made her company a preferred supplier for most other products. The contracts awarded by Sonangol to Candando are worth several hundred million dollars a year.

== Financial sector corruption ==
Mismanagement and appropriation are a serious problem in the Angolan banking system: by 2013, approximately $3.5 billion dollars of defaulted loans existed in Angola's banks. Angolan banks have historically operated according to similar appropriation strategies: banks capitalized by the Angolan State are operated by individuals associated with the President that then invest the funds in complicated networks of companies that are ultimately controlled by members of the presidential patronage network. The investments are either: in the form of unsecured loans to companies registered in tax havens that default on the loan and launder the money through the international financial system; or, the money goes towards a real project in Angola, but the project is operated by a patronage company that gained the contract through an un-tendered process and will appropriate the investment over the course of the project.

=== BNA ===
In the largest financial fraud in Angola at the time, the Central Bank of Angola (also known as BNA) was the location of an alleged fraud case of about $160 million transferred to overseas accounts in 2009. Several money transfers were discovered from the Angolan treasury account at Banco Espírito Santo in London to bank accounts abroad controlled by the suspects. When the bill reached the minimum values of the BNA, it was the BES London itself that warned the authorities of Angola of the successive outflows of money. The case of fraud was revealed by the Portuguese newspaper Diário de Notícias in June 2011. Several key employees of the Angolan Finance Ministry and the BNA in Luande were sentenced to up to eight years in prison in 2011. There are still investigations going on in Portugal and Angola. In 2010, 18 low-level employees of the central bank and finance ministry were arrested for embezzling roughly US$137 million.

In 2010, a US senate corruption investigation committee reported that, "Aguinaldo Jaime, who served as the governor of the National Bank of Angola from 1999 to 2002, initiated a series of suspicious US$ 50 million transactions with US banks. For each attempt, the banks, concerned about the likelihood of fraud, ultimately rejected the transfer or returned the money shortly after receiving it. The government could not account for approximately US$ 2.4 billion over the period of Jaime’s three-year tenure as central bank governor.”

=== FSDEA ===
The Angolan sovereign wealth fund (Fundo Soberano De Angola) was created in 2011 with an initial capitalization of US$5 Billion. The President appointed his son, José Filomeno dos Santos, as chief executive, who then appointed long-time associate Jean Claude Bastos as the funds manager. The fund has since been used according to the standard appropriation strategies for financial institutions. In 2017, the paradise papers revealed that Jean-Claude Bastos was paid $90 million in management fees between 2014 and 2015. The money went to a variety of his companies registered in the Virgin Islands and Mauritius. During his tenure, the fund also invested in several projects where Mr. Bastos had a conflict of interest, including a deep sea port in the province of Cabinda and a hotel in Luanda.

=== BESA ===
The Banco Espirito Santo Angola was created in 2002 by the Banco Espirito Santo, a Portuguese family owned bank. In 2009 a company controlled by Manuel Vicente, General Manuel Dias Júnior (also the minister of State and President's Security Chief), and General Leopoldino Fragoso do Nascimento acquired 24% ownership of the bank for $375 million. The transaction was financed by a loan of 400 million from the Angola Development Bank (BAI), the purpose of the additional 25 million was not stated and its eventual use is unclear. Manuel Vicente was Vice President of the board of directors of the BAI at the time, presenting a conflict of interest. Isabella dos Santos has also owned 19% of the bank since 2006. Audits of BESA by KPMG and Deloitte show that between 2009 and 2013 the BESA lost over $5 billion to unsecured loans made to asset-less internationally registered companies. These revelations prompted corruption investigations in Portugal against the Santo family, BES employees, and members of the Angolan Elite. BESA collapsed in 2014.

=== BDA ===
The Angolan Development Bank (Banco de Desenvolvimento de Angola) was created in 2006. In 2016, the BDA revealed that it had $400 million of losses due to unsecured loans that had not been repaid, and that approximately 70% of the loans ever issued by the BDA were without collateral. Paixão Franco Júnior was the bank's chairman between 2006 and 2013, by 2010 he had inexplicably become one of Angola's 50 wealthiest people. Reports emerged in 2013 linking him to corruption.

== Infrastructure corruption ==
There has been a high level of infrastructure corruption in Angola since the early 2000s. High oil prices provided the funds and access to credit necessary to rebuild the country's infrastructure after the civil war, and a major construction boom ensued. Many major infrastructure contracts were issued to firms owned by regime insiders without competitive bidding processes. The magnitude of corruption was such that, according to the Portuguese newspaper Expresso, President Dos Santos awarded over $14 billion of public contracts to his children's companies between 2006 and 2016.

The general process of appropriation from infrastructure projects involves pricing the project above what it should cost, then sub-contracting the construction to a foreign firm for less money. Additionally, the Angolan government and Angolan Banks often ultimately assume most of the financial costs, while allowing the patronage company to retain a disproportionate share of ownership.

The construction of the deep water port of Cabinda illustrates the details of the above strategy. In 2011, Caioporto S.A., a newly created company owned by Mr. Bastos de Morais, was granted the contract through an un-tendered process. The initially stated plan was for the $500 million project to be entirely funded by private sector loans to Caioporto, however: such investment was not forthcoming. In an effort to attract investment, the President amended the contract such that the Angolan government would guarantee all loans made to Caioporto, and also guarantee the company a minimum profit - effectively assuming all the risk while allowing Caioporto to retain full ownership of the port. Four years later the project had still not received any private investment, so President dos Santos changed the deal again. The cost increased to $890 million: the government would use a loan from China to cover 85% of the cost and the Angolan Sovereign Wealth Fund (FSDEA) would pay the remaining 15% in exchange for 50% ownership of the port. Construction was to be done by the China Road and Bridge Corporation (CRBC). The result is effectively that Mr. Bastos de Morais acquired 50% ownership of the port without contributing any of the necessary investment or doing any of the work. Additionally, José Filomeno dos Santos collected consulting fees from the China Road and Bridge Corporation for helping them secure the deal.

Other notable cases of corruption related to the ownership and construction of infrastructure include: the 2015 Caculo Cabaça Hydroelectric Project; the 2013 Luachimo Dam renovation; the IMOB business tower in Luanda; and the Lobito refinery.

== Media corruption ==
The State and MLPA insiders have a near monopoly on Angola's media: it is used for propaganda and competitors are repressed. Although a press law passed in 2006 ended the government's monopoly on television, it still owns the principal TV station, as well as the nation's only daily newspaper and radio station; and the first purportedly private TV station, established in 2008, is owned by a company with close ties to the president. Corruption is present in the government's formation and use of law against critical journalists and opposition media. Angola's State security and government secrecy laws create the threat of imprisonment for journalists and have been used to prosecute investigative journalists.

=== Costa case ===
In April 1999 Gustavo Costa, a journalist for Expresso, wrote an article entitled Corruption Makes Victims, accusing José Leitāo, the chief presidential advisor, of embezzling government revenue. Police arrested Costa and charged him with difamação and injúria. The Angolan Supreme Court found him guilty, sentencing him to eight-months imprisonment, suspended for two years, and fined him $2,000.

=== Rafael Marques de Morais ===
Rafael Marques de Morias, a journalist and human rights activist, wrote "The Lipstick of the Dictatorship", an article criticizing corruption in the Angolan government and President dos Santos, on July 3, 1999. The National Criminal Investigation Division (NCID) questioned him on October 13 for several hours before releasing him. Later that day Morais gave an interview with Rádio Ecclésia and repeated his criticism of the dos Santos government. Twenty armed members of the Rapid Intervention Police arrested him along with Aguiar dos Santos, the publisher of Agora, and Antonio José Freitas, Agora staff reporter, on charges of defamation on October 16, 1999. Marques said dos Santos bore responsibility for the "destruction of the country... for the promotion of incompetence, embezzlement and corruption as political and social values."

In 2015, Rafael Marques de Morais received a 6-month suspended sentence for slander and defamation for publishing a report about human rights abuses in Angolan diamond mines. The accusation was that two senior Army Generals that held mining concession had been using the police and private security forces to violently displace competing diamond miners.

Rafael Marques de Morais stood trial again in April 2016 for "insulting a public authority" under Angola's State Security Law. He had published a report that accused the attorney general, General João Maria de Sousa, of changing the designation of a 3-acre beachfront property to "rural land" so that he could buy it from the state for $3500 and then re-designate it and build a condominium development. There was also a second charge for "committing an outrage against a body of sovereignty" because the report included an accusation that president dos Santos protects corrupt actors. Mariano Brás, the director of the weekly newspaper O Crime was also charged with the same crimes for publishing the report.

== Domestic anti-corruption ==
Despite the fact that President dos Santos began to publicly advocate a “zero tolerance” approach to corruption in 2009, domestic enforcement of existing law is minimal and the investigative capacity of control agencies is weak. Domestic anti-corruption policy in Angola remained a facade throughout dos Santos' presidency because he was the main source of government policy as well as the operator and primary beneficiary of corruption in Angola.

There are some prospects for future reform, however. João Lourenço became leader of the MLPA and was elected President on August 23, 2017. He has pledged to combat corruption and improve governance; however, the pervasive culture of corruption and the entrenched interests in the legislature, bureaucracy, Judiciary, military, and business community create a significant barrier. Although it is not unprecedented for an otherwise highly corrupt regime to pursue corruption reform in specific sectors of the economy if it is in the interest of the regime (such as in the Philippines and Indonesia). The continuation of low oil prices and international pressure could prompt reform in core areas like banking oversight, tax collection, or infrastructure contracts. Doing so would require the creation of anti-corruption agencies that are sufficiently funded and empowered to investigate and persecute corruption in an efficient and independent way.

If the political will were to become present, Angola would require improvement to its transparency and oversight mechanisms such that the existing institutions that are meant to combat corruption have the capabilities to perform that function. Doing so would require a dramatic increase in funding and re-design of their powers. Given Angola's starting position, doing so would amount to a comprehensive reform of the civil service.

== Political change ==
João Lourenço was elected President on August 23, 2017. He has been a member of the MLPA since he joined as a teenager during the colonial war. He followed a typical MLPA career trajectory: he received military training and education in the Soviet Union; then was a member of the military through the 1980s; then he served as secretary-general from 1998–2002; a member of the national assembly from 2002-2014 until he became the minister of defense. Despite his long history with the MLPA, his corruption record is surprisingly clean and his wealth and business interests - although significant - are not nearly on the same level as those closest to president dos Santos.

President Lourenço has presented himself as a reformer. Since his election he has stated that he intends to: improve government probity and increase transparency and accountability; diversify the economy; nurture and autonomous civil society; and reduce censorship of the media. João Lourenço's opposition to the status quo is uncertain, however; there is a rumor that there was a deal between Lourenço and dos Santos prior to the transfer of power whereby Lourenço agreed to protect the legal, economic and political interests of dos Santos' inner circle. In contradiction to this reported agreement, however: President Lourenço did remove the inner circle of corrupt actors (Manuel Vicente, General Helder ‘Kopelipa’ Vieira Dias, Isabel dos Santos, Eduardo dos Santos, Jean Claude Bastos de Morais) from their appointed positions; specifically targeted their economic interests; and has initiated legal proceedings.

He has also targeted their economic interests and sources of appropriation. In his inaugural address, he specifically mentioned the monopolies on Angolan cement and telecommunications, both controlled by Isabel dos Santos. He then shut down GRECIMA, the propaganda bureau of the President's office, in late 2017. GRECIMA had been accused of diverting hundreds of millions of dollars to a company, Semba Comunicação, owned by Isabel and Jose Filomeno dos Santos over the past decade. In 2011, this amount totaled 110 million. In March 2018, the Attorney General's office indicted Jose Filomeno dos Santos and Valter Filipe for their role in an attempt to send $500 million from the National Bank of Angola (BNA) to an account in London. British authorities detected the fraud and froze the funds. These actions suggest that President Lourenço has the political will to take real action against corruption, but the case is ongoing (at the time of writing) so it is too early to tell if it will yield results or if the new president will continue persecuting corruption beyond dos Santos' inner circle.

In November 2017, President Lourenço's invited IMF staff to Angola to make preparations for a formal Article IV consultation mission that was completed in March 2018. The preliminary IMF report on the mission portrays the Lourenço government favorably and implies that they may be inclined to pursue reform at SOEs, the banks and governance (and that they might have to if oil prices remain low). The full report on the consultation mission will be released in May 2018.

President Lourenço's decisions have been generally praised, even by those traditionally critical of the government. He has maintained the support of the MLPA and the military so far; but it remains unclear whether or not he is a true reformer, or if he is merely seeking to remove the network of his predecessor, consolidate his own power, and garner some much needed domestic and international legitimacy by presenting himself as acting against corruption. Even if President Lourenço would like to be a reformer, it seems unlikely that the MLPA will allow significant change to the status quo. Although he has removed dos Santos' inner circle, the remaining party elite have entrenched interests throughout the economy and it is unlikely that they would accept major reform that affects their privileged position in Angola's political economy. Although it is possible that the entrance of a new president - in the context of an economic crisis and growing protests, international reform pressure, and assistance from foreign legal entities - could create some space for progress. The need for credibility and efficient government finances could lead to a compromise between the entrenched interests and the new regime, whereby control agencies are empowered to deal with lower level corruption or with specific components of the economy whose integrity is deemed essential to the long run viability of the regime.

There is also some evidence against the probity of President Lourenço. In February 2018, he was accused of being involved in a transaction where he had a conflict of interest and gained personal benefit. 5 passenger aircraft were sold by the Angolan state to three companies connected to the president: SJL-Aeronautica, owned by his brother; Sociedade Agropecuária de Angola, owned by General Higino Carneiro, the Deputy Chairman of the parliament; and, Air Jet, owned by a former Air Force officer, António de Jesus Janota Bete. The planes were sold for an undisclosed sum and without any bidding process.

== Legislation ==
Angola does have a reasonably comprehensive set of anti-corruption laws, however, they are rarely enforced. The laws below are the main anti-corruption laws in Angola, their combination technically prohibits most corrupt actions, however; violations are dealt with through the normal judiciary and there are no dedicated agencies that have the capacity to investigate and persecute violations.

=== Public Contracting Law (2006) ===
The Public Contracting Law governs the government contracting process and contains provision that affect both public and private actors. Its provisions effectively prohibit corrupt actions; however, it also lacks enforcement mechanisms beyond a clause stipulating that any contract made in violation of the law is automatically nullified.

=== Public Probity Law (2010) ===
The public probity law governs the behavior of public actors in Angola. It provides decent coverage for prohibiting corrupt actions, but there are some notable omissions and it does not include mechanisms for investigation and enforcement. It allows individuals to report violations to the courts, who then decide whether or not to pursue an investigation. The process is not transparent and leaves complainants with no further recourse if the case is ignored by the underfunded and politically influenced judiciary. The law also contains an anti-libel clause that has been used to sue journalists for making corruption allegations. In the context of low trust in institutions and a history of violence these factors make it unlikely that complaints will be made and progress to trial.

The Public Probity Law contains some potential loopholes. The law allows for exceptions when public officials can accept gifts (i) goods that can be transferred to the State or public entities; (ii) gifts that conform to normal protocols and are not detrimental to the good image of the State; (iii) gifts on festive occasions, such as birthdays, weddings and New Year. The public probity law prohibits a substantial list of items that cannot be given to a public official, but there are some notable exceptions such as jewelry and shares of stocks.

The public probity law also states that all government officials must declare their wealth every two years, but the information is not made public and can only be access by a court order if it is relevant to an investigation. There is no real audit mechanism so the reporting requirements can easily satisfied dishonestly.

=== Money laundering laws ===
Angola's anti-money laundering legislation includes: the Law on Combating Money Laundering and the Financing of Terrorism; and, the Law on Designation and Enforcement of International Legal Acts. The law makes the expected prohibitions, including reporting requirements for financial institutions.

There is also the 2015 Law on the Criminalization of Infractions related to Money Laundering contains many more provisions than its name implies. It contains prohibits against a variety of criminal activities and was produced so that Angola could conform to the international treaties that the country has ratified. The law has been criticized for having relatively light penalties that can be further reduced if the money is returned.

== Control agencies ==
An effective control agency has: autonomy from political interference; full jurisdiction (no immunity for positions in government); the power and capacity to investigate and prosecute cases of corruption; a court system that is also autonomous and equipped to handle cases in an efficient manner (ideally as a court separate from the main court system that is specialized for corruption); competent staff and decentralized leadership; procedures to have its performance evaluated.

While Angola does have some anti-corruption agencies, they are generally lacking in the above characteristics. Although, the core legislative and institutional structures of typical control agencies do at least exist. Angola's anti-corruption institutions are:

1. There is a specialized corruption bureau within the office of the Attorney General, but this position is appointed by the president and cases are prosecuted in the mainstream court system, so the effectiveness of the bureau is dependent on top-down political will and the competence of the courts.
2. The Office of the Ombudsman was formed in 2005. Its purpose is to receive human rights complaints from citizens and produce reports that make recommendations. It submits bi-annual reports to the Commission of the National Assembly; the reports receive superficial attention but have not produced any actions. The Ombudsman is chosen by 2/3 vote in the legislature; the political independence of the office has been questioned.
3. The Court of Accounts, whose director is appointed by the President, is responsible for auditing government spending. The institution has the power to investigate, but then must refer their report to the judiciary, where a decision to prosecute or investigate further is made. The audits are not publicly disclosed.
4. The Financial Information Unit was created in 2011 and is responsible for auditing Angolan banks. They receive legally mandated reports and are responsible for collaborating with law enforcement and the financial control agencies of other countries. In 2013 the Financial Action Task Force (FATP) criticized Angola's Anti-money laundering laws (AML) and FIU for not sufficiently: criminalizing money laundering and terrorist financing; establishing and implementing an adequate legal framework for the confiscation of funds related to money laundering and the identification and freezing of terrorist assets without delay; ensuring an effectively functioning Financial Intelligence Unit; and ensuring that appropriate laws and procedures are in place to provide mutual legal assistance. In 2016, however, the FATP stated that Angola had made sufficient progress to no longer require monitoring - although they continue to work with the State to improve AML policy and institutions.

== Media, civil society and resistance ==
A critical media, active civil society and the presence of protests can contribute to the likelihood that reform will occur. It can gradually spread awareness, change culture, and keep reform on the government's agenda. In the case of Angola, these factors have been consistently been repressed such that their size and effect have been limited. The existence of protests and need for repression could have some consequences for regime stability if excessive repression and further deterioration of the economic situation prompts enduring large scale protest that disrupt the status quo (a similar logic to the Arab Spring).

A Protest movement emerged in 2011 following a call for demonstrations by Angolan musician and anti-corruption advocate Luaty Beirao; however, only a few small protests occurred that year and they were quickly shut down by police. The scale of protest increased somewhat in the months before the election, but un-uniformed men would arrive to assault the protesters. The scale of protests has been limited such that no unified organization has emerged from the protest movement, although they refer to themselves as the Revoluciona´ria (Revolutionary Youth) and have some social media presence. Members also commonly engage with opposition groups as individuals.

Protests continued to occur sporadically through 2017 in response to political and economic grievances, and against instances of repression. Notably in response to the arrest and hunger strike of Luaty Beirao in 2015, a 2013 leak regarding the extrajudicial killing of two former presidential guards in 2012, and the subsequent revelations of extrajudicial killings under the dos Santos regime through 2016. The scale of the protests has increased, although not to a mass scale; it remains to be seen whether the protest movement will influence the policies of President Lourenco, or if they will be met with continued repression.

== International anti-corruption ==
Angola has faced mounting pressure to conform to international governance norms. Treaties have played an important role in mandating the creation of laws and institutions in Angola. Among others, Angola has signed and ratified the African Union Convention on Preventing and Combating Corruption, in 2004 the African Peer Review Mechanism and the UN Convention against Transnational Organised Crime. In 2010, Angola ratified the United Nations Convention Against Corruption (UNCAC) - the most comprehensive international corruption treaty. In order to comply with these treaties, Angola has implemented reasonably comprehensive anti-corruption legislation. Domestic enforcement has been minimal so far, but international treaties continue to mandate further reform that will at least provide Angola with a framework of anti-corruption legislation.

International institutions and foreign legal institutions can also mitigate Angolan corruption to some extent. Their policies focus on ensuring that their loans are not appropriated, and ensuring that multi-national corporations are not involved in bribery. Legal action is limited to cases where individuals, companies, and the money involved in corruption leaves Angola and violates foreign law, then the actors involved could face legal consequences in foreign courts. There have been cases where the regulatory agencies of foreign countries have detected the money laundering of Angolan actors and initiated their own legal proceedings, such as the BESA case and the related bribery and judicial interference case against Manuel Vicente. Further suspicion of Angolan transactions could increase scrutiny and create a barrier to their ability to use their illicit profits, prompt asset recovery attempts or potentially even the sanction of specific individuals. Aggressive international intervention has not occurred thus far, as major nations have thus far remained strategically indifferent to support their interests in stability, continued access to oil and the interests of their MNCs in Angola.

Intervention by international actors generally requires that the country in question invite the intervention. For specific cases, assistance with regard to the costs involved, investigation, human capital, asset recovery, extradition, and collaboration with foreign legal systems is theoretically available. Similarly for institution building, the knowledge, logistics, and training required to establish effective control agencies could be provided, but again this is dependent on Angola's political will.

=== Cases of foreign institutions affecting Angolan corruption ===
In 2017, Manuel Vicente incurred numerous charges related to his bribery of a Portuguese prosecutor during the BESA investigation in 2013. The investigation uncovered that BESA (partially owned by Mr. Vicente) had lost $6.8 billion in a pattern of unsecured loans, however; inexplicably, the prosecutor Orlando Figueira, decided that there was not enough evidence to proceed. Portugal's Judicial Police investigated this suspicious decision: they found that Figueira had received 400,000 Euros from a company linked to Sonangol, and had also breached court confidentiality by providing Vicente's lawyer with all of the relevant documents during the investigation. Mr Vicente remains under investigation.

The March 2018, indictment of Jose Filomeno dos Santos and Valter Filipe was made possible by British oversight agencies that recognized the transaction as suspicious, froze the funds and referred the information to Angolan authorities.

As of 2013 there are three Angolan money laundering cases being investigated in Portugal. Two of which involve funds of suspicious origin that seem to have passed through multiple jurisdictions and from businesses to 3rd party individuals before being used to buy real estate in Portugal. In these cases the investigations have stalled because Angola did not provide financial information. The third case was incidentally discovered during a tax crime investigation of a Swiss company. The company was also the recipient of funds from an offshore account controlled by a Portuguese company that exports food products to an Angolan supermarket chain owned by a high ranking Angolan military officer. Funds flow from the Angolan company to the offshore account, then most of the funds proceeded to the Portuguese company, but a portion was diverted to the Swiss company and then distributed to accounts controlled by other Angolan officials. $2 million was distributed in this way between 2006 and 2010.

In 2017, the United States also launched an investigation regarding collaboration between Angolan actors and American corporations to launder money and conceal bribe payments.

=== The limits of international money laundering and bribery law ===
The idea that international law can constrict the financial flows of corrupt actors and provide opportunities for them to be charged in foreign courts is dependent on the participation of the countries involved. In practice these laws are avoidable: Angolan actors have been known to use tax havens where financial oversight is weak and such laws are not robustly enforced. International financial oversight is dependent upon collaboration between domestic financial oversight agencies; if the trail of money passes through an uncooperative jurisdiction (such as Angola), it can become impossible to get the information necessary to satisfy the evidence requirements of a court case.

The preferred investment destination of wealthy Angolans is Portugal, surprisingly there have not been any bribery or money laundering convictions related to these transactions. A recent OECD report has accused Portugal of neglecting to investigate money laundering and bribery according to its treaty obligations. Only 15 foreign bribery cases have occurred in Portugal since 2001, 8 were closed before trial and the other 7 remain in the investigative phase. The report raises the possibility that Portugal's economic interests in Angola influence the country to neglect the issue and that Angola has influenced the Portuguese judicial system to ignore specific cases of corruption.

=== The influence of China ===
China has become Angola's largest trading partner. The relationship began with growing purchases of oil (63% of Angolan output in 2016) and expanded with Chinese loans and direct investment in oil exploration and infrastructure construction (totaling over $20 billion since 2003). China has completed projects in every sector of the Angolan economy and their projects tend to be completed on time and on budget, and at a much lower cost than Angolan firms would have been able to provide. This has been criticized as providing insulation from international pressure for reform, as the Chinese are known for being willing to ignore the corruption and human rights issues of its international partners. While the details of the relationship between Angola and China are not transparent, there is no evidence to suggest that China behaves any differently than Western countries or MNCs have in the past.

It is possible that Angola's relationship with China could have a negative effect on the appropriation of state resources and a positive effect on Angola's development. Since 2014, China has become more cautious with their investments due to corruption complaints from Chinese construction firms and revelations that SINOPEC was losing money on its Angolan operations, and the decline in the price of oil and the consequent growth of Angola's national debt. China's method of investment makes it difficult for Angolan actors to mismanage or appropriate capital: lines of credit are secured by oil; and the investments are used for specific projects that are operated mostly by Chinese firms and workers, so there are fewer points of contact with rent seeking Angolan firms or bureaucrats. China could be a barrier to corruption if it is diligent with its investment and continues to buy the majority of Angolan output and provide the majority of foreign investment to Angola; although if this not the case, then an indifferent dominant trading partner could provide insulation from the international pressure and financial constraints that might otherwise prompt reform.

== See also ==
- International Anti-Corruption Academy
- Group of States Against Corruption
- International Anti-Corruption Day
- ISO 37001 Anti-bribery management systems
- United Nations Convention against Corruption
- OECD Anti-Bribery Convention
- Transparency International
- July 2025 Angolan protests
