= 2026 in Angola =

- Centuries: 20th; 21st
- Decades: 2000s; 2010s; 2020s
- See also: List of years in Angola

Events in the year 2026 in Angola.

== Incumbents ==
- President: João Lourenço
- Vice President: Esperança da Costa

== Events ==
=== March ===
- 28 March–14 April: Floods kill 71 people and displace 1956 others.

=== April ===
- 18–21 April – Pope Leo XIV visits Angola.

=== May ===
- 24 May – 2026 Angola gold mine landslide: A landslide strikes an illegal gold mining site in Bengo Province, killing at least 28 people. Four people are rescued.

=== July ===
- 23 July – Two Russian nationals are convicted of terrorism and espionage and sentenced to eight and 11 years' imprisonment, respectively, for plotting a coup and attempting to influence the 2027 Angolan general election.
- 24 July – The United States imposes a 12.5% tariff on Angola, citing the presence of alleged forced labor in the supply chain.

== Holidays ==
- 1 January – New Year's Day
- 4 February – Liberation Day
- 3-4 March – Carnival
- 8 March – International Women's Day
- 23 March – Day of the Liberation of Southern Africa
- 4 April – Peace Day
- 18 April – Good Friday
- 1 May – Labour Day
- 17 September – National Heroes' Day
- 2 November – All Souls' Day
- 11 November – Independence Day
- 25 December – Christmas Day

== Deaths ==
- 1 January – Serafim Shyngo-Ya-Hombo, 80, Roman Catholic prelate, auxiliary bishop of Luanda (1990–1992) and bishop of Mbanza Congo (1992–2008)
