= 2027 in Angola =

- Centuries: 19th; 20th; 21st
- Decades: 2000s; 2010s; 2020s
- See also: List of years in Angola

Events in the year 2027 in Angola.

== Incumbents ==
- President: João Lourenço
- Vice President: Esperança da Costa

== Events ==
=== Scheduled ===
- Before August: 2027 Angolan general election

== Holidays ==
- 1 January – New Year's Day
- 4 February – Liberation Day
- 3-4 March – Carnival
- 8 March – International Women's Day
- 23 March – Day of the Liberation of Southern Africa
- 26 March – Good Friday
- 4 April – Peace Day
- 1 May – Labour Day
- 17 September – National Heroes' Day
- 2 November – All Souls' Day
- 11 November – Independence Day
- 25 December – Christmas Day
