= 2022 in Angola =

- Centuries: 20th; 21st
- Decades: 2000s; 2010s; 2020s
- See also: List of years in Angola

Events in the year 2022 in Angola.

== Incumbents ==
- President: João Lourenço
- Vice President: Bornito de Sousa (until 14 September); Esperança da Costa onwards

== Events ==
Ongoing — COVID-19 pandemic in Angola

27 July - The Lulo Rose, a pink diamond, the largest in 300 years, is discovered at the Lulo mine in Lunda Norte Province, Angola.

24 August - 2022 Angolan general election: Angolans vote to elect their president in a tight race between incumbent leftist candidate João Lourenço and center-right candidate Adalberto Costa Júnior.

25 August - The electoral commission announces that President João Lourenço's MPLA has won the general election.

24 September - Thousands of people protest in Luanda, Angola, accusing incumbent president João Lourenço of electoral fraud in the latest election,

== Deaths ==
- 22 February - Jesús Tirso Blanco, 64, Argentina-born Roman Catholic prelate.
- 18 May - Fernando Guimarães Kevanu, 85, Roman Catholic prelate.
- 4 July - José Eduardo dos Santos, 79, politician.
- 17 July - Miguel Maria N'Zau Puna, 90, politician and diplomat.
- 19 August - Gustavo Costa, 63, journalist, stroke.
- 31 October - José Nambi, 73, Roman Catholic prelate.
- 18 November - Nagrelha, 36, Kuduro musician.
- 12 December - Assunção dos Anjos, 76, Angolan diplomat, minister of external relations, heart attack.
