= 2020 in Angola =

- Centuries: 20th; 21st
- Decades: 2000s; 2010s; 2020s
- See also: List of years in Angola

Events from the year 2020 in Angola.

== Incumbents ==
- President: João Lourenço
- Vice President: Bornito de Sousa

== Events ==
Ongoing – COVID-19 pandemic in Angola

=== January ===
- 17 January – Italian oil company Eni begins production at the offshore Agogo oil field with an initial extraction of 10,000 barrels per day.
- 19 January – Isabel dos Santos, the daughter of former President José Eduardo dos Santos, is accused in a report by the International Consortium of Investigative Journalists of embezzling much of her estimated $2.2 billion fortune from Angolan public money through nepotism and corruption. dos Santos refutes the allegations, calling them an "orchestrated attack" by the Lourenço government.

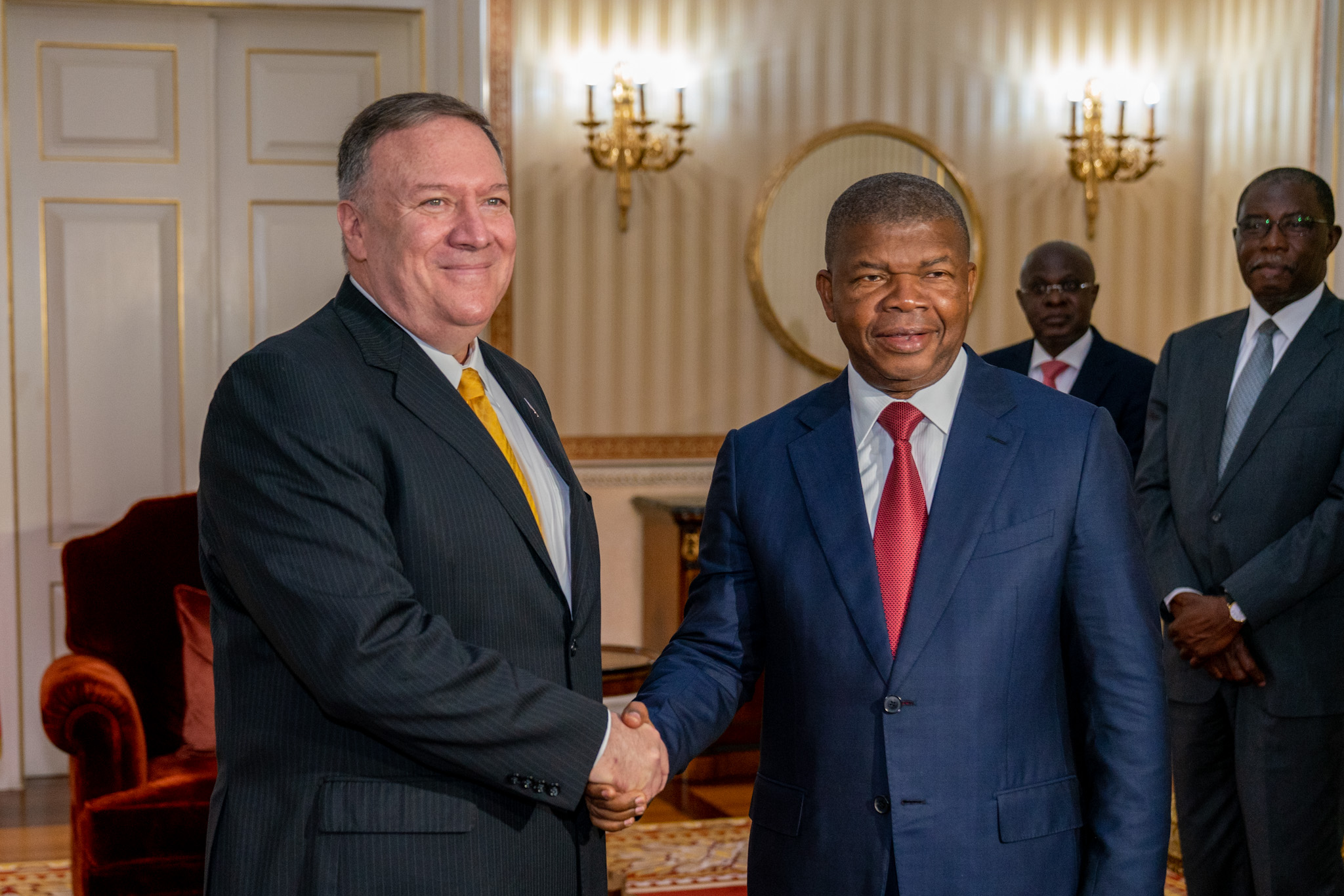
17 February: President João Lourenço meets with United States Secretary of State Mike Pompeo

=== February ===
- 17 February – A visit by United States Secretary of State Mike Pompeo takes place in Luanda, in which Pompeo commends government efforts to reduce corruption within the country.

=== March ===
- 17 March – The Jornal de Angola reports that a debt of $100 million owed to Angola by Chad is to be paid in cattle, with a total of 75,000 cows valued at $1,333 each to be transferred to the Angolese government over the next ten years.
- 21 March – Health Minister Silvia Lutucuta confirms the country's first two cases of COVID-19 after two citizens returning from Portugal days earlier test positive for the virus.
- 23 March – Schools and universities across the country close for a period of fifteen days to limit the spread of COVID-19.
- 29 March - Health Minister Silvia Lutucuta announces Angola's first fatalities from the COVID-19 pandemic – a 37-year old and a 59-year old who had both returned from Portugal more than two weeks prior – with the total number of confirmed cases in the country rising to seven. The country's first recorded recovery from the virus is announced the following day.

=== May ===
- 11 May – President João Lourenço announces a fifteen-day extension of the national state of emergency, warning that an easing of restrictions would place the country "in serious danger of evolving to community transmission". A total of 43 cases of COVID-19 have been reported in Angola as of this date, with 13 recoveries and two deaths.
- 25 May – The Cabinet announces that the national state of emergency is to end the following day, to be replaced by the lesser "state of calamity" until the provisional date of 9 June.

=== June ===
- 9 June – In an interview with newspaper Valor Económico, Isabel dos Santos confirms that four of the eight Candando supermarket stores in the country will close with the loss of approximately 1,000 jobs, blaming her inability to pay suppliers on the freezing of her assets in December 2019.
- 11 June – The Finance Ministry reports a 48% drop in the value of the country's oil exports for May compared to April, a result of reduced international demand for oil from worldwide COVID-19 lockdowns and lower domestic production in line with other OPEC countries.
- 13 June – The Secretary of State for Public Health, Franco Mufinda, reports the number of cases of COVID-19 in Angola has increased to 138 and the number of recoveries has risen to 19. As of this date six people have died from the virus and 549 remain in quarantine.
- 23 June – The Universal Church of the Kingdom of God of Angola splits from the central management in Brazil after local demands to tackle financial irregularities and discrimination within the organisation go unheeded. The church has approximately 500,000 adherents in Angola.

=== July ===
- 7 July – The government agrees to OPEC demands to further reduce national oil production until September after exceeding previously agreed quotas in May and June by at least 60,000 barrels per day.

=== August ===
- 14 August – José Filomeno dos Santos, the son of former President José Eduardo dos Santos, is sentenced to five years in prison for misappropriating $500m from the nation's sovereign wealth fund during his tenure as the fund's head.
- 15 August – Prosecutor-General Alvaro Da Silva Joao announces the closure of seven properties across Luanda owned by the Universal Church of the Kingdom of God over claims of corruption and tax fraud.

== Deaths ==
- 26 May – Oscar Lino Lopes Fernandes Braga, Roman Catholic prelate (b. 1931).
- 20 June – Pedro Lima, actor and Olympic swimmer (1988, 1992) (b. 1971).
- 24 July – Kundi Paihama, politician (b. 1944).
- 10 August – Waldemar Bastos, musician (b. 1954).
- 11 October – Fernando Lopes, 55, Olympic swimmer (1980).

== See also ==
- List of years in Angola
- 2020 in Angola
