= 2004 in Angola =

- Centuries: 20th; 21st
- Decades: 1980s; 1990s; 2000s; 2010s; 2020s
- See also: List of years in Angola

Events from the year 2004 in Angola

== Incumbents ==
- President: José Eduardo dos Santos
- Prime Minister: Fernando da Piedade Dias dos Santos
- President of the National Assembly: Roberto Francisco de Almeida

== Events ==
=== January ===
- January 20: Angola establishes diplomatic relations with Slovenia.

=== February ===
- February 23: Angola establishes diplomatic relations with Sri Lanka.

=== May ===
- May 12: President George W. Bush welcomes President Jose Eduardo dos Santos of Angola to the Oval Office.

=== July ===
- July 15: Angola establishes diplomatic relations with Jordan.

=== August ===
- August 6: FAO/WFP Crop and Food Supply Assessment Mission to Angola.
- August 13 to 29: Angola at the 2004 Summer Olympics
- August 28: NASA satellite image of fire and smoke in Angola.

=== October ===
- October 28: Angola establishes diplomatic relations with Yemen.

=== November ===
- November 20: The Angola national football team defeats Zambia to win the 2004 COSAFA Cup tournament.

=== Full date unknown ===
- The Angola International Airport site is selected.
- The Foundation of Science and Development is created.

== Deaths ==
- April 19: Julião da Kutonda, 39, Angolan footballer
- June 19: Óscar Ribas, 94, Angolan writer
- July 2: Mfulupinga Nlando Victor, 59, Angola National Assembly member, mathematics teacher, and political party founder.
- July 25: Francisco Romão, 61, Angolan deputy foreign minister, suicide
- August 8: Henrique Abranches, 71, Angolan writer and anthropologist

== See also ==
- Angola at the Olympics
