= 2023 in Angola =

- Centuries: 20th; 21st
- Decades: 2000s; 2010s; 2020s
- See also: List of years in Angola

Events in the year 2023 in Angola.

== Incumbents ==
- President: João Lourenço
- Vice President: Esperança da Costa

== Events ==
Ongoing — COVID-19 pandemic in Angola

- 20 January - The Angola Central Bank cuts interest rates from 19.5% to 18%, the steepest cut since 2018.
- 10 March - Angola announces that it will deploy troops to the Democratic Republic of the Congo, following the failure of a ceasefire between government forces and M23 rebels in North Kivu.
- 21 December - Angola leaves OPEC after disagreements about crude oil production quotas. The price of oil falls by over $1 as a result.

== Deaths ==
- 26 February – Mário Lucunde, 65, Roman Catholic prelate, bishop of Menongue.
- 15 April – Francisco Viti, 89, Roman Catholic prelate, bishop of Menongue, archbishop of Huambo.
- 12 June – Reggie Moore, 42, American-born basketball player (men's national team)
- 31 July – Idegarda Oliveira, 92, singer and composer.
- 15 October – Henrique Onambwé, 83, engineer, military officer, politician, co-designer of the national flag.
