= 1992 in Angola =

- Centuries: 20th; 21st
- Decades: 1970s; 1980s; 1990s; 2000s; 2010s
- See also: List of years in Angola

== Incumbents ==
- President: José Eduardo dos Santos
- Prime Minister: Fernando José de França Dias Van-Dúnem (until December 2), Marcolino Moco

== Events ==
- March 24 - United Nations Security Council Resolution 747 to enlarge United Nations Angola Verification Mission II
- August 27 - abolition of the People's Republic of Angola and creation of the Republic of Angola
- September 29–30: 1992 Angolan general election
- October 30 - November 1: Halloween Massacre, also known as the Three Day War.
- November 30 - United Nations Security Council Resolution 793 to extend the mandate of the United Nations Angola Verification Mission II

== Deaths ==
- November 1 - Aliceres Mango
- November 2
  - Jeremias Chitunda
  - Elias Salupeto Pena
