= 2018 in Angola =

- Centuries: 20th; 21st
- Decades: 1990s; 2000s; 2010s; 2020s
- See also: List of years in Angola

Events in the year 2018 in Angola.

== Incumbents ==
- President: João Lourenço
- Vice President: Bornito de Sousa

== Events ==
=== Sexual Orientation and Gender Identity ===
Iris Angola, the country's only gay rights lobby group established in 2013, was given legal status in June. Due to the lack of recognition by the state governments, members of this group had faced discrimination accessing health and education services. This "historic moment" allowed homosexuality rights to be defended in Angola.

=== Treatment of Migrants ===
Over 400,000 Congolese migrants were expelled from Angola in October. President Lourenço claimed this was to reduce diamond smuggling, but was backed up with nonexistent evidence. Nonetheless, migrants were killed, looted, and forced out of the country, expressing fear and intimidation after the expulsion.

== Deaths ==
- 1 April – Almerindo Jaka Jamba, politician (UNITA) (b. 1949).
- 16 October – Jonas (1972–2018) - Carlos Emanuel Romeu Lima, footballer
- 20 October – Pedro Luís Guido Scarpa, Roman Catholic prelate, Bishop of Ndalatando ( b. 1925).
