= 2021 in Angola =

- Centuries: 20th; 21st
- Decades: 2000s; 2010s; 2020s
- See also: List of years in Angola

Events in the year 2021 in Angola.

== Incumbents ==
- President: João Lourenço
- Vice President: Bornito de Sousa

== Events ==
Ongoing — COVID-19 pandemic in Angola

== Deaths ==
- 8 May – Raul Danda, politician, MP (born 1957).
