= Worldwide Governance Indicators =

Measurement of quality of governance

Based on a long-standing research program of the World Bank, the Worldwide Governance Indicators capture six key dimensions of governance (Voice & Accountability, Political Stability and Lack of Violence, Government Effectiveness, Regulatory Quality, Rule of law, and Control of Corruption) between 1996 and present. These indicators measure the quality of governance in over 200 countries, based on close to 40 data sources produced by over 30 organizations worldwide and are updated annually since 2002.

The governance indicators contribute to the growing empirical research of governance which have provided activists and reformers worldwide with advocacy tools for policy reform and monitoring. The indicators, and the underlying data behind them, are part of the current research and opinions that have reinforced the experiences and observations of reform-minded individuals in government, civil society, and the private sector, that good governance is key for development. Their growing recognition of the link between good governance and successful development, as empirical evidence suggests, has stimulated demand for monitoring the quality of governance across countries and within individual countries over time. Virtually all of the individual data sources underlying the aggregate indicators are, along with the aggregate indicators themselves, publicly available.

The Worldwide Governance Indicators are a compilation of the perceptions of a very diverse group of respondents, collected in large number of surveys and other cross-country assessments of governance. Some of these instruments capture the views of firms, individuals, and public officials in the countries being assessed. Others reflect the views of NGOs and aid donors with considerable experience in the countries being assessed, while others are based on the assessments of commercial risk-rating agencies.

A complementary vision of the macro-level Worldwide Governance Indicators are the World Bank Governance Surveys, which are country level governance assessment tools developed by the World Bank Institute.

== Criticisms ==
The Worldwide Governance Indicators offer a useful snapshot of some perceptions of a country's quality of governance but researchers have pointed out significant problems in their construction. These critiques have been extensively rebutted by the WGI authors in several publications.

These critics have claimed that users often fail to take into account or are not aware of their limitations. Criticisms include:

- Too complex: The WGI "Control of Corruption" uses 24 different sources in varying combinations for different countries. The sheer number and diversity of indicators, produced by others, in a single WGI make it very difficult to understand.
- Arbitrary: For example, WGI use the indicator "Environmental regulations hurt competitiveness" from the World Economic Forum's Executive Opinion Survey, but ignore that Survey's several questions that give high ratings to countries with a high standard of environmental protection.
- Absence of an underlying theory of "good" governance: no normative concept or unifying single theory to distinguish between good or bad governance. When are taxes, labour or environmental regulatory protection desirable and when are they excessive?
- Hidden biases: Low weight given to household surveys relative to the weights of expert assessments and firm surveys. For example, Gallup's World Poll that asks citizens about their exposure to crime gets zero weight for "Rule of Law", but Global Insight Business Risk and Conditions, a U.S. commercial business information provider that measures the crime risk to businesses, gets the third highest weight.
- Lack of comparability over time and space: For example, the WGI "Control of Corruption" for Eastern Europe and Central Asia has 23 different combinations of sources, but only four pair of countries ratings are based on a common set of sources.
- Lack of actionability: WGI offers little guidance to concrete actions to improve the quality of governance. For example, an indicator for Rule of Law "how secure business people feel about their property" not why they feel that way.
- Over-selling: The World Bank Institute advertises its WGIs as "reliable measurements of governance", but for example gives the misleading impression that the views of ordinary citizens are well represented, making the indicators particularly attractive to donor agencies concerned about the poor. WBI heavily stressed inclusion of the Gallup World Poll, a cross-country household survey available for a large number of countries, but Gallup's World Poll gets zero weight on two WGIs, marginal weight on two other WGIs and provides no data for the remaining two.
- Lack of conceptual clarity: "[T]he six governance indicators measure a broad underlying concept of 'effective governance' … they appear to say the same thing, with different words … the six indexes do not discriminate usefully among different aspects of governance. Rather, each of the indexes – whatever its label – merely reflects perceptions of the quality of governance more broadly. An implication is that they may have limited use as guides for policymakers, and for academic studies of the causes and consequences of 'good governance' as well… their availability may well have crowded out efforts at measuring the impact of institutions as they really exist in a particular place on real outcomes."

== Strengths ==
Despite the above noted limitations and concerns recent econometric research looking at how reliable some of these indicators are, vis-a-vis data collected from natural experiments and other observational surveys, have actually concluded that the Good Governance Indicators do in fact seem to be measuring, albeit imperfectly, levels of corruption and government effectiveness. Concepts like corruption are inherently illicit and therefore difficult to measure. While including multiple sources can make these indicators confusing, it can also avoid the potential for bias or influence over any single source. The weighting process for these indicators attempts to improve on issues of uncertainty present in other indices like the Corruption Perceptions Index. These indicators are also well correlated with other indicators of good governance indicating that any issues present may be present in all governance indicators.

These indicators also have credibility due to their wide use in academia, international development, and business. They are used by a range of credit rating agencies such as Moody's, Standard & Poor's, and Fitch to determine sovereign bond ratings. A number of bilateral foreign assistance agencies, such as the US Government's Millennium Challenge Corporation condition aid on a country's performance on these indicators. These uses are often justified by reference to the connection between these indicators and development outcomes such as growth and poverty reduction as well as technical features of this dataset such as the broad country coverage and consistent, annual updates.

== See also ==
- Good governance
- Government effectiveness index
- Regulatory reform
- Ibrahim Index of African Governance
- World Justice Project
