= 2026 Angola floods =

Natural disaster in Angola

- Location of Benguela Province
- Date: February–April 2026
- Location: Angola
- Type: Flooding
- Cause: Heavy rainfall
- Deaths: 71
- Property damage: Tens of millions of USD
- Displaced: 1,956

Deadly floods affected different parts of Angola in 2026. Floods first struck Cunene Province in February, destroying at least 306 houses and causing widespread crop destruction. Later, havy rainfall triggered widespread flooding across several provinces in March–April, most severely affecting Benguela Province, Luanda Province, and Cuanza Sul Province. Flooding also reported in several other provinces in western, central, and southern Angola. Damage caused by the April floods are estimated to be in the tens of millions of USD.

== Flooding and impacts ==
Riverine flooding triggered by heavy rainfall struck Cunene Province in late February, particularly affecting the municipalities of Cuvelai, Cuanhama, and Mupa. Flooding destroyed at least 306 houses, with 500 families affected by the destruction of crops.

Heavy rainfall began in late March and continued into April. In Luanda Province, Luanda recorded 83.2 mm of rainfall in 24 hours between 4 and 5 April, and Camama recorded 97.2 mm of rainfall in the same period. In Benguela Province, Lobito recorded 180.4 mm of rain over a 24 hour period. Dikes along the Cavaco River in Benguela collapsed in at least three locations on 12 April, flooding entire neighborhoods of the town. Two bridges were destroyed, one railway and one pedestrian. An estimated 50,000 people were impacted in Luanda and Benguela. GDACS reported that there were 71 fatalities and 1,956 displaced persons during the broader incident from 28 March through 14 April. American insurance company Arthur J. Gallagher & Co. estimated that the April flood event caused economic losses in the tens of US dollars.

== Response ==
President of Angola João Lourenço mourned the deaths caused by the floods. He declared that government assistance would be provided to flood victims through state agencies mobilized for relief response.

The Benguela provincial government stated that temporary accommodation centers had been set up in public and religious facilities, including the Ombaka National Stadium. Up to 16,000 households were sheltered in emergency shelters. The World Health Organization provided psychosocial support to 200 families following the floods. The governor of Benguela Province announced the construction of social housing for affected families beginning in June. Local activist Tiago Ngana accused the government of failing to distribute aid equitably.

== See also ==
- 2026 in Angola
- List of floods
