= 2019 in Angola =

- Centuries: 20th; 21st
- Decades: 1990s; 2000s; 2010s; 2020s
- See also: List of years in Angola

Events in the year 2019 in Angola.

== Incumbents ==
- President: João Lourenço
- Vice President: Bornito de Sousa

== Events ==
=== January to June ===
Cunene Province (highlighted) was particularly affected by the year's drought

- 23 January – The National Assembly agrees a new criminal code, the country's first since independence in 1975. Among the new provisions passed, according to Human Rights Watch, are the decriminalisation of same-sex activity and the outlawing of discrimination based on sexual orientation.
- 13 March – A site holding between 450 and 600 million barrels of oil is discovered off the Angolan coast by Italian company Eni.
- 22 March – The Angola national football team qualifies for the 2019 Africa Cup of Nations finals following a 1–0 victory over Botswana in Francistown.
- 30 April – A UNICEF report reveals that drought in the first three months of the year has caused a three-fold rise in the number of Angolans in the southern Cunene Province needing humanitarian assistance to more than 800,000. The report also states that approximately 2.3 million people in the country are now at risk of food insecurity, with severe malnutrition affecting 2,500 children under the age of five in six provinces.
- 8 May – President João Lourenço dismisses Carlos Saturnino from his role as Chief Executive of the state oil company Sonangol after fuel shortages cause power cuts and long lines at petrol stations in the capital Luanda.

=== July to December ===
- 2 July – The Angola national football team is eliminated from the Africa Cup of Nations after a 1–0 defeat to Mali ends their chances of progressing beyond the group stage of the competition.
- 15 August – Former transport minister Augusto da Silva Tomas is found guilty by the Supreme Court of charges including embezzlement, fraud, and abuse of power committed during his tenure in office from 2008 to 2017. He is sentenced to fourteen years in prison.
- 21 August – Presidents Paul Kagame of Rwanda and Yoweri Museveni of Uganda sign an agreement in Luanda to cool tensions between their respective nations after recent accusations of espionage, murder, and disruptions to trade.
- 8 September – The men's national basketball team ends its participation at the 2019 FIBA World Cup in China with one win and four losses from five games.
- 1 November – Aristofanes dos Santos, the provincial commander of the national police, announces that national disarmament campaigns over the past eleven years have resulted in the forfeiture of more than 100,000 firearms, most of which can be traced to the Angolan Civil War.
- 5 December – The International Monetary Fund authorises a $247 million loan to Angola after deeming the government's efforts to reduce state expenditure and diversify the national economy beyond oil as sufficient.
- 31 December – The assets of Isabel dos Santos, the daughter of former President José Eduardo dos Santos, are frozen by the government after she is accused of failing to repay $1 billion in state funds.

== Deaths ==
- 9 January – Filipe Abraão, basketball player (b. 1979).
- 15 January – Jerónimo Neto, handball coach (b. 1967).
- 15 April – Joaquim Alberto Silva, footballer (b. 1974).
- 22 November – Eduardo Nascimento, singer (b. 1943).
