= 2007 in Angola =

- Centuries: 20th; 21st
- Decades: 1980s; 1990s; 2000s; 2010s; 2020s
- See also: List of years in Angola

Events from the year 2007 in Angola

== Incumbents ==
- President: José Eduardo dos Santos
- Prime Minister: Fernando da Piedade Dias dos Santos
- President of the National Assembly: Roberto Francisco de Almeida

== Events ==
=== June ===
- June 28: A TAAG-Angola Airlines Boeing 737 crashes in northern Angola resulting in the death of at least five passengers on the same day the European Union bans the airline from European airspace.

=== August ===
- August 21: The governments of Angola and the Democratic Republic of the Congo are negotiating over a line demarcating each nation's respective rights to petroleum in the Atlantic Ocean. The DRC is expected to gain exploration rights to billions of untapped barrels worth of oil.

=== September ===
- September 21: Angolan police arrest Jomo Gbomo, the head of the Movement for the Emancipation of the Niger Delta, a rebel organization in Nigeria.

== Deaths ==
- August 2: Holden Roberto, 84, founder and leader of the FNLA (1962–1999), after long illness.
