= Public holidays in Angola =

Angola has twelve public holidays that can be increased by bridge holidays if a holiday falls on a Tuesday or Thursday. 2022 has fifteen national holidays.

Date	English name	Angolan Name	Remarks
January 1	New Year's Day	Dia de Ano Novo	
February 4	Liberation Day	Dia da Libertação	Celebrates the beginning in 1961 of the Angolan War of Independence
Tuesday before Lent; February or March	Carnival	Carnaval	
March 8	International Women's Day	Dia Internacional da Mulher	
March 23	Day of the Liberation of Southern Africa	Dia da Libertação da África Austral	Celebrates the Battle of Cuito Cuanavale
Friday of Holy Week; March or April	Good Friday	Sexta Feira Santa	Crucifixion of Jesus
April 4	Peace Day	Dia da Paz	Celebrates the end of the Angolan Civil War
May 1	Labour Day	Dia do Trabalhador	
September 17	National Heroes' Day	Dia do Fundador da Nação e do Herói Nacional	Birthday of Agostinho Neto, first president
November 2	All Souls' Day	Dia de Finados	
November 11	Independence Day	Dia da Independência	From Portugal, 1975
December 25	Christmas Day	Dia de Natal	Birth of Jesus
