= 1999 in Angola =

- Centuries: 20th; 21st
- Decades: 1970s; 1980s; 1990s; 2000s; 2010s
- See also: List of years in Angola

The following lists events that happened during 1999 in Angola.

== Incumbents ==
- President: José Eduardo dos Santos
- Prime Minister: Dr. Fernando José de França Dias Van-Dúnem (until 29 January), vacant (starting 29 January)
- President of the National Assembly: Roberto Victor de Almeida

== Events ==
=== January ===
- January 7 - Zimbabwe says its military intervention in the Democratic Republic of the Congo is being funded by France, Libya and Angola.
