= 1998 in Angola =

- Centuries: 20th; 21st
- Decades: 1970s; 1980s; 1990s; 2000s; 2010s
- See also: List of years in Angola

The following lists events that happened during 1998 in Angola.

== Incumbents ==
- President: José Eduardo dos Santos
- Prime Minister: Dr. Fernando José de França Dias Van-Dúnem
- President of the National Assembly: Roberto Victor de Almeida

== Events ==
=== August ===
- August 29 - The rebels are reported to have evacuated the port city of Matadi, Democratic Republic of the Congo. Angolan troops are reported to have arrived supporting Kabila without fighting in the city.
- August 31 - Angola admits to sending troops to DRC.

=== September ===
- September 3 - South Africa now says it supports the intervention of the Democratic Republic of the Congo by Namibia, Zimbabwe and Angola, supporting Kabila.

=== December ===
- December 5 - The rebel leader said that Angolan and Zimbabwean troops have launched a counter-offensive against his troops in the northwest of the Democratic Republic of the Congo.
