= 2025 in Angola =

- Centuries: 20th; 21st
- Decades: 2000s; 2010s; 2020s
- See also: List of years in Angola

Events in the year 2025 in Angola.

== Incumbents ==
- President: João Lourenço
- Vice President: Esperança da Costa

== Events ==
=== January ===
- 31 January – A court in Switzerland convicts the commodity firm Trafigura of corruption in a bribery case involving a former executive of an Angolan state-owned distribution company in exchange for ship chartering and bunkering contracts and sentences the company to pay 3 million Swiss francs ($3.2 million) in fines and prison sentences to three individuals.

=== March ===
- 14 March – Angola denies entry to senior African political figures, including Botswana's former president Ian Khama, Tanzanian opposition leader Tundu Lissu, and Mozambique's Venâncio Mondlane.

=== May ===
- 20 May – A fire breaks out on Chevron’s offshore Benguela-Belize Lobito-Tomboco Platform (BBLT) during maintenance near Cabinda Province, killing three people and injuring 17 others.

=== June ===
- 10 June – The European Union adds Angola to its list of high risk jurisdictions for money laundering and terrorism financing.

=== July ===
- 28 July – A three-day strike is launched by taxi drivers in Luanda in protest against increased fuel prices, resulting in violent demonstrations in the capital and in Huambo that leave 22 dead.

=== August ===
- 12–24 August – FIBA AfroBasket 2025: Angola wins its 12th AfroBasket title after defeating Mali 70-43 in the final at the Kilamba Arena in Luanda.

=== September ===
- 27 September – Quiçama National Park is designated as a biosphere reserve by UNESCO.

=== December ===
- 16 December – US President Donald Trump issues a proclamation imposing partial travel restrictions on Angolan nationals travelling to the United States.

== Holidays ==
- 1 January – New Year's Day
- 4 February – Liberation Day
- 3-4 March – Carnival
- 8 March – International Women's Day
- 23 March – Day of the Liberation of Southern Africa
- 4 April – Peace Day
- 18 April – Good Friday
- 1 May – Labour Day
- 17 September – National Heroes' Day
- 2 November – All Souls' Day
- 11 November – Independence Day
- 25 December – Christmas Day

== Deaths ==
- 18 December – Fernando da Piedade Dias dos Santos, 75, prime minister (2002–2008), vice president (2010–2012) and twice president of the National Assembly
