= Nagrelha =

Angolan musician (1986–2022)

- Birth name: Gelson Caio Manuel Mendes
- Born: 1986; Luanda, Sambizanga, Angola
- Died: November 18, 2022 (aged 36)
- Genres: Kuduro

Gelson Caio Manuel Mendes, better known as Nagrelha (1986 – November 18, 2022), was an Angolan musician. He was a pioneer of the kuduro genre and one of its best-known stars.

Born in the Luanda neighbourhood of Sambizanga, Nagrelha grew up in a tough environment, where he experienced gang violence, drug abuse, and stints in jail. His group, Os Lambas, released their first major hit, 'Comboio', in 2006, and proceeded to become one of the most renowned of all kuduro acts. According to Kalaf Epalanga, founding member of the Portuguese group Buraka Som Sistema, the video for 'Comboio' "marks a before and an after in music video production in Angola"; it is said to have "defined kuduro’s visual esthetics".

Nagrelha was a lifelong supporter of the MPLA, the political party that has ruled Angola since independence, and frequently performed at party functions. José Eduardo dos Santos, president of Angola from 1979 to 2017, was also from Nagrelha's neighborhood of Sambizanga.

Nagrelha died in 2022 from lung cancer at the age of 36. His funeral was attended by over 20,000 people; there were a number of looting incidents and at least one death, and mourners were dispersed by police using tear gas. Many reports contrasted the massive outpouring of grief for Nagrelha with the relatively subdued funeral of ex-president dos Santos just a few months before.
