= 2013 in Angola =

- Centuries: 20th; 21st
- Decades: 1990s; 2000s; 2010s; 2020s
- See also: List of years in Angola

Events in the year 2013 in Angola. The country had a population of 19,183,590.

== Incumbents ==
- President: José Eduardo dos Santos
- Vice President: Manuel Vicente
- President of the National Assembly: Fernando da Piedade Dias dos Santos

== Sports ==
- 19 July to 4 August - The country competed at the 2013 World Aquatics Championships
- 10–18 August - The country competed at the 2013 World Championships in Athletics
- 20–28 September - The country hosted the 2013 FIRS Men's Roller Hockey World Cup, in Luanda and Namibe (now Moçâmedes)
- 15 November - Start of the 2013–14 BAI Basket season
- 16–23 November - Inaugural edition of the Angola Second Division Basketball Championship, won by Sporting Clube de Benguela
