= Raúl Correia Mendes =

Angolan journalist and filmmaker (1949 – 2015)

- Born: 3 September 1949; Luanda
- Died: March 2015 (aged 65); Luanda
- Citizenship: Angolan
- Occupations: TV journalist; Filmmaker; director; producer; Editor; Cameraman
- Years active: 1972-2015
- Known for: Algodão, Sahara a coragem vem no vento, Bom Dia Camarada, O Ouro branco de Angola, Louanda Luanda, O Encontro, O Legado do Gigante

Raúl Augusto Leiro Correia Mendes (1949 – 2015) was an Angolan television journalist and filmmaker. He worked for Televisão Pública de Angola (TPA) as a cameraman, editor, producer and director.

== Life ==
Raúl Correia Mendes was born on September 3, 1949, in Luanda. He started his professional career as a television producer at TVA in 1972, working on sport, music and news programs. In 1974 he joined Televisão Pública de Angola, and was part of the team who made the first official television broadcast in Angola.

== Death ==
He died in Luanda in March 2015. The Angolan Minister of Social Communication, José Luís de Matos, issued a public statement in his memory.

== Films ==
- Algodão, 1977
- Sahara a coragem vem no vento. Short documentary, 1977.
- Bom Dia Camarada, 1978
- O Ouro branco de Angola, 1978
- Louanda Luanda, 1980
- O Encontro, 1980
- O Legado do Gigante, 1980
- A Nossa Musica, 1980
- Kitala, 1982
- Jidanti Jimba, 1982
