= 2016 in Angola =

- Centuries: 20th; 21st
- Decades: 1990s; 2000s; 2010s; 2020s
- See also: List of years in Angola

This article lists events from the year 2016 in Angola.

== Incumbents ==
- President: José Eduardo dos Santos
- Vice president: Manuel Vicente

== Events ==
- 20 January – 2016 Angola and DR Congo yellow fever outbreak

=== Sport ===
- 5-21 August – Angola at the 2016 Summer Olympics: 25 competitors in 7 sports

== Deaths ==
- 27 February – Lúcio Lara, politician (b. 1929).
- 3 June – Henrique N'zita Tiago, separatist politician (b. 1927).

== Links ==
Media related to 2016 in Angola at Wikimedia Commons
