= Jonas (footballer, born 1972) =

Angolan footballer

Personal information
- Full name: Carlos Emanuel Romeu Lima
- Date of birth: 22 September 1972
- Place of birth: Angola
- Date of death: 16 October 2018 (aged 46)
- Position: Midfielder

Senior career*
| Years | Team | Apps | (Gls) |
| 1996–2004 | Petro Atlético | | |
| 2005–2006 | Primeiro de Maio | | |

International career
| 1998–2001 | Angola | 17 | (0) |
- * Club domestic league appearances and goals

Carlos Emanuel Romeu Lima (22 September 1972 – 16 October 2018), better known as Jonas, was an Angolan footballer who played for the Angola national team.

== National team statistics ==
Appearances and goals by national team and year
| National team | Year | Apps | Goals |
|---|---|---|---|
| Angola | 1996 | 2 | 0 |
| Angola | 1998 | 6 | 0 |
| Angola | 1999 | 7 | 0 |
| Angola | 2001 | 1 | 0 |
| Angola | 2002 | 1 | 0 |
| Total | | 17 | 0 |
