= Mass media in Angola =

The mass media in Angola is primarily controlled by Angola's dominant political party, the People's Movement for the Liberation of Angola (MPLA).

== Journalism ==
The country's official news agency is the government-owned Angola Press Agency (ANGOP), founded in 1975, and formerly allied with the official news agency of the Soviet Union, the Telegraph Agency of the Soviet Union (TASS). "The press was nationalized in 1976."

=== Print ===
Recent publications also include magazines such as Deebs, founded in 2023.

Angolan newspapers include:

- Agora
- Angolense
- O Apostolado
- A Capital
- Folha 8
- Jornal de Angola
- Novo Jornal
- O Pais
- Semanário Angolense

== Telecommunications ==
=== Television and radio ===
TV Zimbo in a rival privately owned channel in Angola. On December 16, 2015, a new private TV station, Palanca TV, began broadcasting from the South African satellite subscription TV provider DStv.

== See also ==
- Quem Quer Ser Milionário? (Angolan TV show)
- Telephone numbers in Angola

== Bibliography ==
- "Angola: Directory: the Press". Africa South of the Sahara 2004. Regional Surveys of the World. Europa Publications. 2004. p. 62+. ISBN 1857431839.
- Historical Dictionary of Angola (2nd ed.), USA: Scarecrow Press, 2011-05-05, ISBN 9780810871939 (Includes information about newspapers, radio, tv)
- Rita Figueiras; Nelson Ribeiro (2013). "New Global Flows of Capital in Media Industries after the 2008 Financial Crisis: The Angola–Portugal Relationship". International Journal of Press/Politics. 18 (4): 508. doi:10.1177/1940161213496583. S2CID 146997968.
- Toyin Falola; Daniel Jean-Jacques, eds. (2015). "Angola: Media". Africa: an Encyclopedia of Culture and Society. ABC-CLIO. ISBN 978-1-59884-666-9.
- "Angola", Freedom of the Press, USA: Freedom House, 2016, OCLC 57509361
