= Aliceres Mango =

Angolan politician (1953–1992)

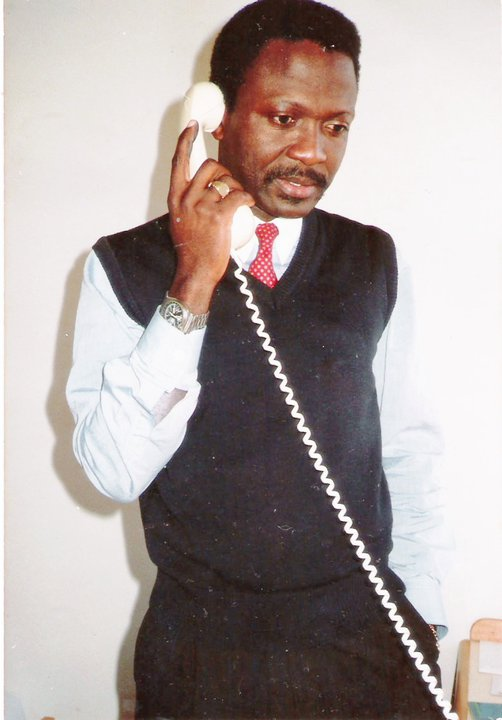
Adolosi Mango at his desk in Bonn

Aliceres Mango (died 1992) was an Angolan politician and general secretary for UNITA.

He was killed in the Halloween massacre.
