= July 2025 Angolan protests =

The July 2025 Angolan protests were sparked by the governments' decision to increase fuel prices and cut fuel subsidies, resulting in a wave of strikes, marches, and riots across the country. The protests began with a strike of taxi drivers in the capital city of Luanda, that quickly spread into nationwide protests. The protests turned violent, causing property damage, that brought strong police response and loss of lives. This marked the deadliest civil unrest in the country, since the end of the civil war.

== Background ==
Even though Angola is one of the biggest oil producers in Africa, a large part of its population lives in poverty. In the last few decades the government maintained fuel subsidies, to help keep transport and living cost relatively low. The government led by President João Lourenço decided in mid-2025 to implement fiscal reforms, which reduced subsidies that meant a raise of 33% in the price of diesel. This price increase had a great effect on the transport sector, mainly minibus taxi drivers who are a key factor in public transportation. This came despite warnings from the Taxi association that this move would cause an increase in fare prices, adding to the hardship of the low-income population. The decision came at a time when people were already unhappy about high unemployment, rising prices, and inequality.

== Protest outbreak ==
On July 12, 2025, low-scale demonstrations organized by youth and civil society groups were held in Luanda. It was reported that these demonstrations were broken up by the police using tear gas and rubber bullets. On the 28 of July 2025, the National Association of Taxi Drivers of Angola (ANATA), called a three-day strike in Luanda. The strike escalated very fast, sparking protests in other provinces such as Benguela, Huambo, and Huíla. While some protests remained peaceful, others escalated into violent riots with looting, property damage and clashes with police.

== Government and police response ==
As the protest grew violent, security forces including police and army men came into action to restore order to the streets. They used tear gas, smoke grenades, rubber bullets and in several cases live ammunition. These measures, according to official figures of 22 people killed, nearly 200 injured, and more than 1,200 arrested during the protest.

Human rights groups claimed that security forces used too much force, but the government said it was needed to stop violence and vandalism. Despite the government's claims, Amnesty International and Human Rights Watch criticized the authorities for arbitrary arrests and called for independent investigations into the use of force. Human rights activist Laurinda Manuel Gouveia publicised the case of Inácio Pessela, a 15-year-old boy who had been paralysed after being shot by police officers during the protests.

== Political and social impact ==
Reports claim that the protests reflected the ongoing frustration of the people of Angola with the current government, ruled by the People's Movement for the Liberation of Angola (MPLA), since 1975. experts say the unrest was a sign that the public was losing support for the government, especially with the 2027 elections coming up. While Civil society groups said the protests were about more than just high fuel prices. They also reflected problems like unemployment, bad public services, and inequality.

=== Chinese in Angola ===
In August 2025, shortly after the protests began, dozens of Chinese-owned retail shops were looted and thousands of Chinese nationals fled the country.

== Reactions ==
Government

The Angola government defended its decision about the subsidy cuts calling it fiscally necessary, while condemning the violence, and promised investigations into alleged abuses.

Opposition parties

The opposition accused the government of mismanagement and called for accountability.

Human rights organizations

Amnesty International and Human Rights Watch called for a transparent investigations and condemned the brutal use of force.

International community

Several foreign governments expressed concern over the loss of life and urged restraint by security forces.

== See also ==
- 2025 in Angola
