= Óscar Ribas =

Angolan writer

Oscar Bento Ribas
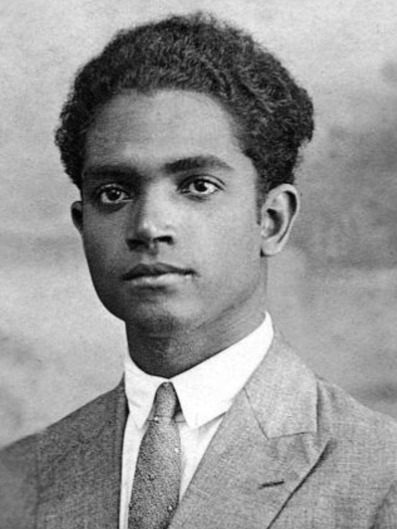
- Born: 17 August 1909; Luanda, Angola
- Died: 19 June 2004 (aged 94); Lisbon, Portugal
- Writing career
- Language: Portuguese

Oscar Bento Ribas (17 August 1909 – 19 June 2004) was an Angolan writer.

Ribas was born in Luanda, the son of Arnaldo Gonçalves Ribas (who was Portuguese) and Maria de Conceição Bento Faria (Angolan). His first publications were two novels: Nuvens que passam (Clouds that pass) in 1927 and Resgate de uma falta (Rescue of a lack) in 1929.

Ribas suffered from gradual loss of eyesight in his 20s. Nevertheless, he continued to research and write. In 1950 he published: Flores e espinhos (Flowers and Thorns) and Uanga ( Magic ) and in 1952 Ecos da minha terra (Echoes of my land). Together with Echoes Of My Land and The Evil Spell (1951), Ribas's writings took on a distinct African character. The Evil Spell is about the marriage of an African man and woman. It is interwoven with Mbundu fables, songs, and folklore. In 1969, Ribas published an expanded edition of the novel.

== Researches ==
Ribas also conducted and published seminal researches. In 1958 Ribas published Ilundo: Angolan Divinations and Rites, his 18-year study of Mbundu culture and religion. His second publication on Angolan culture was Missosso: Traditional Angolan Literature. This three-volume work was published in 1961. It was a linguistic work that also contained a vernacular dictionary and Portuguese translations of Angolan tales. The fascination Ribas had for Angolan culture and his affection for the country received in-depth treatment in his autobiography All of This Happened (1975).

He was awarded the Medal Gonçalves Dias for the National Library of Rio de Janeiro in 1968.

Ribas died on 19 June 2004 in Lisbon, Portugal.
