= Idegarda Oliveira =

Angolan composer and singer (1931–2023)

Idegarda Oliveira (February 20, 1931 – July 31, 2023) was an Angolan singer and composer also known as Hildegarda Oliveira or Garda. She was the first Angolan to record a vinyl record released in her home country: 1958's Maria Candimba.

== Biography ==
Idegarda Oliveira was born to a mulata mother and white father in Luanda, Angola, in 1931. She studied violin at the Academy of Luanda until the sixth grade.

Oliveira started her career working as a telephone operator for customs and for the Bank of Angola, but she pursued music on the side. In 1956, she founded the musical act "Garda e o seu conjunto"—"Garda and Her Ensemble"—alongside Horácio Júnior, Alberto de Oliveira and Fernando Perez do Amaral. The following June, she was invited to sing at a private festival of new artists in Azeitão, Portugal, that was attended by various aristocrats. Her successful performance at this event led to opportunities to perform at the Casino Estoril and on television.

Alongside her Ensemble, in 1958, Oliveira recorded the EP Maria Candimba (also known as Madya Kandimba). She composed several of the numbers on the record herself. Produced by the label Valentim de Carvalho, it was the first vinyl record by an Angolan artist, and the first Portuguese-recorded one to be released in Luanda. It was never marketed in Portugal.

After this, at age 29, Oliveira decided to follow her musical passion and settle permanently in Portugal. In 1962, she enrolled in the National Conservatory of Lisbon, where she studied solfège and violin. However, after injuring her hand in a household accident, she had to let go of her goal of becoming a classical violinist, although she continued to teach music. She married and had a son with a Portuguese soldier, José Joaquim Löfgren Rodrigues, born in Pedroso, Vila Nova de Gaia in 13 Set 1934, who in 17 Fev 1973 died in Angola during the Portuguese Colonial War.

In this period, Oliveira stopped playing music and lived in Spain and Switzerland, where she worked as a cook, as a housekeeper, and in child and elder care.

Oliveira resumed singing at festivals, bars, and restaurants in her later years, but she could not support herself economically as a musician, relying instead on her pension from the Bank of Angola. Fifty years after the release of her first record, she returned to the Valentim Carvalho studios to record a self-titled album, a mix of covers and original compositions, which was released on CD in 2010.

Idegarda Oliveira died in Faro, Portugal on July 31, 2023, at the age of 92.
