= 2017 in Angola =

- Centuries: 20th; 21st
- Decades: 1990s; 2000s; 2010s; 2020s
- See also: List of years in Angola

This article lists events from the year 2017 in Angola.

== Incumbents ==
- President: José Eduardo dos Santos (until 26 September), João Lourenço (starting 26 September)
- Vice President: Manuel Vicente (until 26 September), Bornito de Sousa (starting 26 September)

== Links ==
Media related to 2017 in Angola at Wikimedia Commons
