= 2014 in Angola =

- Centuries: 20th; 21st
- Decades: 1990s; 2000s; 2010s; 2020s
- See also: List of years in Angola

Events in the year 2014 in Angola. The country had a population of 19,813,180.

== Incumbents ==
- President: José Eduardo dos Santos
- Vice President: Manuel Vicente
- President of the National Assembly: Fernando da Piedade Dias dos Santos

== Event ==
=== October ===
- October 16 - New Zealand, Malaysia, Angola, Spain and Venezuela have been elected to sit on the United Nations Security Council for two years from 2015.
