= Mfulupinga Nlando Victor =

- Born: 15 December 1944; Maquela do Zombo, Angola
- Died: 2 July 2004 (aged 59); Luanda, Angola
- Occupation(s): Politician, professor of Universidade Agostinho Neto.
- Children: 5

Mfulupinga Nlando Victor (15 December 1944 – 2 July 2004) was a member of the Angola National Assembly and a teacher of mathematics. He was distinguished as the founder and president of the political party PDP-ANA. On 2 July 2004, 60-year-old Victor died as a result of an assault by a fatal gunshot wound.

== Biography ==
Mfulupinga Nlandu Victor was born on 15 December 1944 in Maquela do Zombo, Uíge province, Angola. Due to colonial repression, he was in exile in what was then Congo Leopoldville. During his time here, he focused on devoting himself to his studies and mobilizing Angolan students outside the country. Later, he was elected president of the Angolan college students in the Democratic Republic of the Congo.

He organized and directed the first congress of Angolan students in exile, which was held in Kinshasa (DRC) and hosted about 500 participants from various continents.

He returned to Angola after independence in 1975 and became a member of the Interim Board of the Association.

Mfulupinga Victor created a focus group that culminated on 17 March 1991 with the constitution of the PDP—ANA, where he served as president.

He was a professor at Agostinho Neto University, where he taught mathematics and held the positions of head of the Mathematics Department at the Faculty of Economics and Head of the Department of Mathematics and Engineering in the College of Geographical Sciences.

After founding the PDP-ANA and serving as president, he was elected deputy to the National Assembly in the legislature from 1992 to 1996. From 1996 to 2004, he was a member of the 6th Commission and the Council of the Republic.

Mfulupinga Nlandu Victor was killed on 2 July 2004 in Luanda, hours after attending a meeting of the Council of the Republic. He was hit by gunfire from a machine gun, it was speculated to be that of an AK, while driving his car outside the headquarters of his party around the Cassandra, Maianga district neighborhood. The politician received treatment at the Clinic Endiama on Luanda Island, where he eventually succumbed to his injuries. The perpetrators fled with the vehicle's deputy and still have not been caught decades later.

The politician left behind a widow and five children.
