= 2024 in Angola =

- Centuries: 20th; 21st
- Decades: 2000s; 2010s; 2020s
- See also: List of years in Angola

Events in the year 2024 in Angola.

== Incumbents ==
- President: João Lourenço
- Vice President: Esperança da Costa

== Events ==
=== January ===
- Prosecutors formally charge Isabel dos Santos, daughter of former President José Eduardo dos Santos, with fraud, embezzlement, and money laundering.

=== March ===
- Protests break out in Lunda Norte Province over the alleged killing of an artisanal diamond miner.
- 26 March – Angola is officially awarded hosting rights for FIBA AfroBasket 2025, defeating Egypt, Morocco, Senegal, and Tunisia in the process.

=== April ===
- A Luanda court acquits 33 pastors and workers of the Universal Church of the Kingdom of God (IURD) detained during a peaceful protest.

=== June ===
- 5 June – A magnitude 5.1 earthquake strikes Benguela Province, injuring 33 people.

=== July ===
- 25 July – Angola competes at the Paris Olympics with 24 athletes in seven sports. No medals are won, and the women's handball team finishes 5th.
- 30 July – President João Lourenço announces that the Democratic Republic of the Congo and Rwanda have agreed to a ceasefire following Angola-mediated talks. However, the ceasefire collapses before it formally begins on 4 August amid advances by M23 rebels.

=== August ===
- 29 August – President João Lourenço signs two laws restricting media, expression, and assembly: the Crimes of Vandalism law and the National Security law.
- 31 August – Miss Grand Angola 2024 takes place at Centro Cultural Paz Flor, Luanda. Nacira Amaral wins among 13 contestants.

=== November ===
- 23 November – Thousands attend the “For a Hunger-Free Angola” march in Luanda, organized by the United Patriotic Front (FPU).

=== December ===
- 3–4 December – US President Joe Biden conducts his only presidential visit to Angola and sub-Saharan Africa, to advance the Lobito railway project.
- 27 December – President João Lourenço issues pardons for 50 prisoners including José Filomeno dos Santos, a son of former president José Eduardo dos Santos who was convicted of fraud.

== Holidays ==
- 1 January – New Year's Day
- 4 February – Day of the Armed Struggle
- 12–13 February – Carnival
- 8 March - International Women's Day
- 23 March - Southern Africa Liberation Day
- 29 March – Good Friday
- 4–5 April – Angolan Peace Day
- 1 May – Labour Day
- 16–17 September – National Heroes Day Holiday
- 2 November – All Souls' Day
- 11 November – Independence Day
- 25 December – Christmas Day

== Deaths ==
- 4 January - Ruy Mingas, 84, Angolan composer (national anthem), musician, diplomat and politician, deputy (2017–2021).
- 12 June - Fernando José de França Dias Van-Dúnem, 89, politician, president of the National Assembly (1992–1996) and prime minister (1991–1992, 1996–1999).
