= Almerindo Jaka Jamba =

Angolan politician (1949–2018)

Deputy Speaker of the Angolan National Assembly
- In office 2002–2004

Personal details
- Born: 21 March 1949
- Died: 1 April 2018 (aged 69)

Colonel Almerindo Jaka Jamba (21 March 1949 – 1 April 2018) was an Angolan politician and former rebel leader in UNITA.

Jaka Jamba studied in Portugal where he received a degree in philosophy. He was a member of the Angolan National Assembly with UNITA and Angolan ambassador to UNESCO. He was previously the deputy speaker of the Angolan parliament from 2002 to 2004. In 1975, Jamba was named Secretary of State by Jonas Savimbi under UNITA in the "transition government" that operated from January 1975 to July of the same year in accordance with the Alvor Agreement. He was the oldest living member of UNITA.

According to media reports, on April 1, 2018, Jamba suffered a stroke and died on his way to hospital: he was 69.
