= Candando =

Angolan hypermart chain

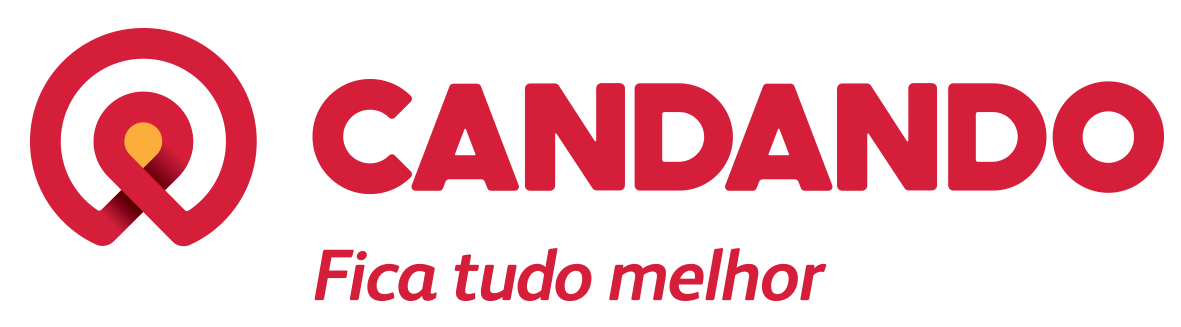
- Company type: Private
- Industry: Hypermarket
- Founded: 2007
- Headquarters: Talatona, Luanda, Angola
- Number of locations: 48 stores (2023)
- Area served: Luanda; Lubango
- Key people: Isabel dos Santos (Majority shareholder)
- Products: Department store
- Revenue: ▲AOA 221.8 billion (2023)
- Number of employees: 1794 (2023)

Candando is an Angolan hypermarket chain. It was founded in 2007 by the retail group Contidis group. It is owned by Isabel dos Santos, the eldest daughter of Angola's former president José Eduardo Dos Santos.

== History ==
Candando opened its first hypermarket in Luanda in May 2016, following an investment of $40 million (€33.8 million). The second store opened in April 2017 in Talatona, on the outskirts of Luanda. The third store opened in December 2017 in Viana, about 30 kilometers from the capital, Luanda. The hypermarket has an area of 4,300 square meters and employs 375 people. At the time of the opening of the first hypermarket, Osório announced plans for ten Candando stores within five years, for an overall investment of $400 million (€338 million). In 2015, Portuguese retail group Sonae sold its 47% stake in Contidis, the holding company that owned the hypermarkets. Initially, Candando was a joint project of Isabel dos Santos alongside the Portuguese retail group Sonae.

== Operations ==
In June 2020, due to the COVID-19 pandemic, Candando announced that it plans to close half of the stores it operates in Angola, with the consequent loss of 1,000 jobs. The decision was confirmed by Isabel dos Santos in an interview with the local financial daily Valor Económico. She explained that the decision was due to the seizure of assets by the Luanda Provincial Court on December 30, 2019, which includes eight Candando stores. According to dos Santos, the Court decision is having a negative impact on the company's operations “as it no longer can have a normal relationship with suppliers”. She added that the company's bank accounts in Portugal are frozen so that it cannot pay suppliers, while all payments abroad are blocked. Candando's business model focuses on local products. At the time of the opening of the first store, Osório announced that the new hypermarket chain will focus on local products. The company's business plan had foreseen the opening of 10 stores in five years, equating to an overall investment of $400 million.
