= World Bank Governance Surveys =

The Governance and Anti-Corruption Country Diagnostics is a survey tool, which uses information gathered from in-depth, country-specific surveys of households, businesses, and public officials about institutional vulnerabilities. The tool is used by the World Bank and partner governments to measure and evaluate critical governance challenges within the public sector.

The diagnostic tool aims to address two of the fundamental challenges policy makers face when trying to curb corruption and improve governance: (i) to obtain the most relevant type of information to identify priorities for reform; and (ii) to create the conditions for sustaining the reform process over time. The results of the surveys allows countries to unbundle corruption (administrative, state capture, bidding, theft of public resources, purchase of licenses); identify weak and strong institutions; assess the costs of corruption to different stakeholders; and identify concrete and measurable ways to reduce those costs. The ultimate goal is to improve the quality of public services by improving governance in personnel and resource management, access to services and citizen feedback mechanisms by feeding into participatory and targeted reform planning.

As of 2013, 23 countries in Latin America, Eastern Europe, and Africa have implemented the surveys.

== The Diagnostic Approach and Process ==
The Governance and Anti-Corruption Country Diagnostic Surveys are built on partnership between multiple actors and the active involvement of the government, civil society and business representatives at different stages of the implementation process. During the data gathering process local NGOs and specialists are employed to allow for capitalization on, and strengthening of, local knowledge and expertise. Two types Diagnostics have been developed: (i) General Governance and Anti-corruption Diagnostics, which require a broad approach to assessing the governance and anti-corruption situation in a country and (ii) Sectoral Governance and Anti-Corruption Diagnostics, which assess a particular sector within the broader GAC context.

While the first approach is the one which has been most frequently used, the second approach is suitable for countries facing unique challenges that require more in-depth and narrowly defined data or countries who are keen to draft a governance reform that focuses only on a few sectors, rather than on the whole public administration. This alternative approach has so far been used in Haiti, Madagascar, Mauritania, Senegal, Morocco and Yemen.

The survey process is tailored to each country to address individual governance context and priorities. However, in most of the countries undertaking this type of work, the project components include:

- A preparatory phase (Phase 0) to identify and recruit the project team and develop a detailed work program.
- A “partnership-promoting” phase (Phase 1) to facilitate the coordination of the different national stakeholders involved in the process.
- A development phase (Phase 2) to assess potential institutional weaknesses, to design and revise diagnostic tools, and (iii) to train staff to carry out the required field work.
- A fieldwork phase (Phase 3) to collect the governance data, using the tools developed in Phase 2. This Phase will include sample design, fieldwork as well as data coding, and will be carried out jointly by local and external experts.
- An analytical and action planning phase (Phase 4), to analyze the data collected in Phase 3 and design a specific action plan to improve governance. The analysis, carried out jointly by the Bank team and local team, led to the completion of a policy report to address questions such as: What is the cost of mis-governance to firms, users, and public finances? What are its consequences? How does mis-governance affect poor users and small firms? What effect does mis-governance have in public service delivery? What are the causes of institutional vulnerability? What are the fundamental issues on which a reform program designed to improve governance and reduce mismanagement should to focus? The policy report is then used by the country to design a specific action plan for governance improvement
- A dissemination phase (Phase 5), to disseminate the results of the analysis completed in Phase 4 to local and central governments, citizens, media and research agencies. Where feasible, the development of internet sites for further data access and dissemination will be promoted and a series of training activities will be organized on the use of the data for policy making and monitoring.

== Outcomes ==
This approach has empowered governments to develop their own governance and anti-corruption strategies based on more objective, micro-level data and a participatory model. The data collected have also allowed practitioners to go beyond a generic concept of corruption by unbundling different types of corruption and identifying more appropriate policy measures.

While in many cases it is premature to evaluate the impact of this alternative approach, some interesting by-products have already emerged. A few countries (Paraguay and Mozambique) have mobilized resources and used on their own the same approach for a second round of assessment. In a couple of cases the country has chosen to institutionalize part of this assessment integrating it in their regular data collection implemented by the National Statistical Agency. Finally, the newly available data has allowed researchers to further our understanding of the link between institutional factors and different types of corruption, and of the impact of poor governance and corruption on citizens.

== Coverage ==
The following countries have completed at least one round of the survey.

- Bangladesh
- Benin
- Bolivia
- Brazil
- Burundi
- Colombia
- Cote d’Iviore
- Ecuador
- Ghana
- Guatemala
- Guinea
- Haiti
- Honduras
- Kenya
- Madagascar
- Malawi
- Mauritania
- Mozambique
- Paraguay
- Peru
- Senegal
- Sierra Leone
- Zambia
