= Independence Day (Angola) =

National holiday in Angola

Angola's Independence Day commemorates the proclamation of national independence, on 11 November 1975. It honors all those who sacrificed their lives during the struggle against Portuguese rule and colonialism, and remembers all those who died in the liberation war and subsequent conflicts.

== Background ==
The armed struggle for the country's independence, the Angolan War of Independence (part the larger Portuguese Colonial War), started on 4 February 1961. The struggle was fought by three movements, the Popular Movement for the Liberation of Angola (MPLA), the National Front for the Liberation of Angola (FNLA) and National Union for the Total Independence of Angola (UNITA), who later fought among themselves. Thousands were tortured, imprisoned, massacred or executed in the fight against colonial rule.

Independence was finally attained after the 1974 Carnation Revolution in Lisbon led to the signing of the Alvor Agreement on 15 January 1975. The Portuguese, the MPLA, the FNLA and the UNITA ended the war of independence with the formation of a transitional government.

In July, the MPLA forced the FNLA out of Luanda, and UNITA voluntarily withdrew to its stronghold in the south. On 10 November, the Portuguese left Angola, and On 11 November, the MPLA's Agostinho Neto declared the independence of the People's Republic of Angola. The Angolan Civil War began immediately after Angola became independent and would not end until 2002.

== Observance and customs ==
Holiday activities include parades, fireworks and concerts. Angolans celebrate the holiday with gatherings, dance parties, feasting and trips to the shore.

== See also ==
- Public holidays in Angola
- Angolan War of Independence
- Portuguese Colonial War
- Alvor Agreement
