= COVID-19 pandemic in Angola =

- Disease: COVID-19
- Pathogen: SARS-CoV-2
- Location: Angola
- First outbreak: Wuhan, Hubei, China
- Index case: Luanda
- Arrival date: 21 March 2020 (6 years, 7 months and 1 week)
- Confirmed cases: 107,487
- Recovered: 63,295
- Deaths: 1,937
- Fatality rate: 1.8%
- Vaccinations: 16,550,642 (total vaccinated); 9,609,080 (fully vaccinated); 27,819,132 (doses administered)

Government website
- http://covid19.gov.ao/

The COVID-19 pandemic in Angola was a part of the worldwide pandemic of coronavirus disease 2019 (COVID-19) caused by severe acute respiratory syndrome coronavirus 2 (SARS-CoV-2). The virus was confirmed to have spread to Angola in late March 2020, with the first two cases being confirmed on 21 March.

== Background ==
On 12 January 2020, the World Health Organization (WHO) confirmed that a novel coronavirus was the cause of a respiratory illness in a cluster of people in Wuhan, Hubei, China, which was reported to the WHO on 31 December 2019.

The case fatality ratio for COVID-19 has been much lower than SARS of 2003, but the transmission has been significantly greater, with a significant total death toll. Model-based simulations for Angola indicate that the 95% confidence interval for the time-varying reproduction number R_{t} exceeded 1.0 until September 2020 but diminished to around 0.5 in the second half of 2021.

== Timeline ==
=== March 2020 ===
- On 19 March, a WhatsApp audio about an alleged case went viral, which was later denied.
- Effective from 20 March, all Angolan borders were closed for 15 days. President João Lourenço banned all arrivals at airports and stopped passenger vessels docking at Angolan ports for 15 days. All these bans will last until 4 April.
- On 21 March, the Ministry of Health confirmed the first two positive COVID-19 cases. The two cases had returned from Portugal. The first case was a Sonangol employee who flew from Lisbon to Luanda. The second case had flown in from Porto and was also under observation in Luanda.
- All schools in Angola closed on 24 March.
- On 29 March, the first two coronavirus-related deaths were recorded, while the total number of confirmed cases rose to seven.
- On 30 March, the first recovery case from COVID-19 was recorded. At the end of the month there had been 7 confirmed cases, 1 recovery and 2 deaths, leaving 4 active cases.

=== April to June 2020 ===
- On 1 April, it was announced that 1900 individuals in pre-trial detention would be released in order to prevent the spread of coronavirus in the country's prisons.
- On 15 April, it was reported that the 2582 people detained in Luanda under the State of Emergency have now been returned to the Zaire Province.
- During the month there were 20 new cases, bringing the total number of confirmed cases to 27. The death toll remained unchanged. Seven patients recovered, leaving 18 active cases at the end of April.
- During the month there were 59 new cases, bringing the total number of confirmed cases to 86. The death toll rose to 4. The number of recovered patients increased to 18, leaving 64 active cases by the end of the month.
- During June there were 198 new cases, bringing the total number of confirmed cases to 284. The death toll rose to 13. The number of recovered patients increased to 93, leaving 178 active cases at the end of the month (178% more than at the end of May).

=== July to September 2020 ===
- There were 864 new cases in July, raising the total number of confirmed cases to 1148. The death toll quadrupled to 52. The number of recovered patients increased to 437, leaving 659 active cases at the end of the month (270% more than at the end of June).
- There were 1476 new cases in August, raising the total number of confirmed cases to 2624. The death toll more than doubled to 107. The number of active cases at the end of the month more than doubled from the end of July, to 1475.
- On 25 August, Amnesty International reported that between March and July, a government taskforce enforcing lockdown restrictions had killed at least seven men and boys.
- On 1 September, a doctor died in police custody after being detained for not wearing a mask, sparking protests on social media and in Luanda.
- On 18 September, footballer Nelson da Luz tested positive for COVID-19. There were 2281 new cases in September, raising the total number of confirmed cases to 4905. The death toll rose to 179. The number of recovered patients increased to 1833, leaving 2893 active cases at the end of the month.

=== October to December 2020 ===
- Vietnam reported six imported COVID-19 cases from Angola who are Vietnamese citizens repatriated on a humanitarian flight on October 20. There were 5900 new cases in October, raising the total number of confirmed cases to 10805. The death toll rose to 284. The number of recovered patients increased to 4523, leaving 5998 active cases at the end of the month.
- There were 4334 new cases in November, raising the total number of confirmed cases to 15139. The death toll rose to 348. The number of recovered patients increased to 7851, leaving 6940 active cases at the end of the month.
- There were 2,294 new cases in December, taking the total number of confirmed cases to 17,433. The death toll rose to 405. The number of recovered patients increased to 10,859, leaving 6,169 active cases at the end of the month.

=== January to March 2021 ===
- There were 2,363 new cases in January, taking the total number of confirmed cases to 19,796. The death toll rose to 466. The number of recovered patients increased to 18,035, leaving 1,295 active cases at the end of the month.
- There were 1,011 new cases in February, taking the total number of confirmed cases to 20,807. The death toll rose to 508. The number of recovered patients increased to 19,322, leaving 977 active cases at the month.
- Vaccinations began on 10 March.
- The variant first identified in South Africa was detected in Angola on 29 March.
- There were 1,504 new cases in March, taking the total number of confirmed cases to 22,311. The death toll rose to 537. The number of recovered patients increased to 20,493, leaving 1,281 active cases at the end of the month.

=== April to June 2021 ===
- There were 4,120 new cases in April, taking the total number of confirmed cases to 26,431. The death toll rose to 594. The number of recovered patients increased to 23,606, leaving 2,231 active cases at the end of the month.
- There were 8,120 new cases in May, taking the total number of confirmed cases to 34,551. The death toll rose to 766. The number of recovered patients increased to 28,079, leaving 5,706 active cases at the end of the month.
- There were 4,298 new cases in June, taking the total number of confirmed cases to 38,849. The death toll rose to 900. The number of recovered patients increased to 33,242, leaving 4,707 active cases at the end of the month.

=== July to September 2021 ===
- There were 3,797 new cases in July, taking the total number of confirmed cases to 42,646. The death toll rose to 1008. The number of recovered patients increased to 36,708, leaving 4,930 active cases at the end of the month. The number of fully vaccinated persons stood at 700,871.
- There were 4,898 new cases in August, taking the total number of confirmed cases to 47,544. The death toll rose to 1217. The number of recovered patients increased to 43,421, leaving 2,906 active cases at the end of the month.

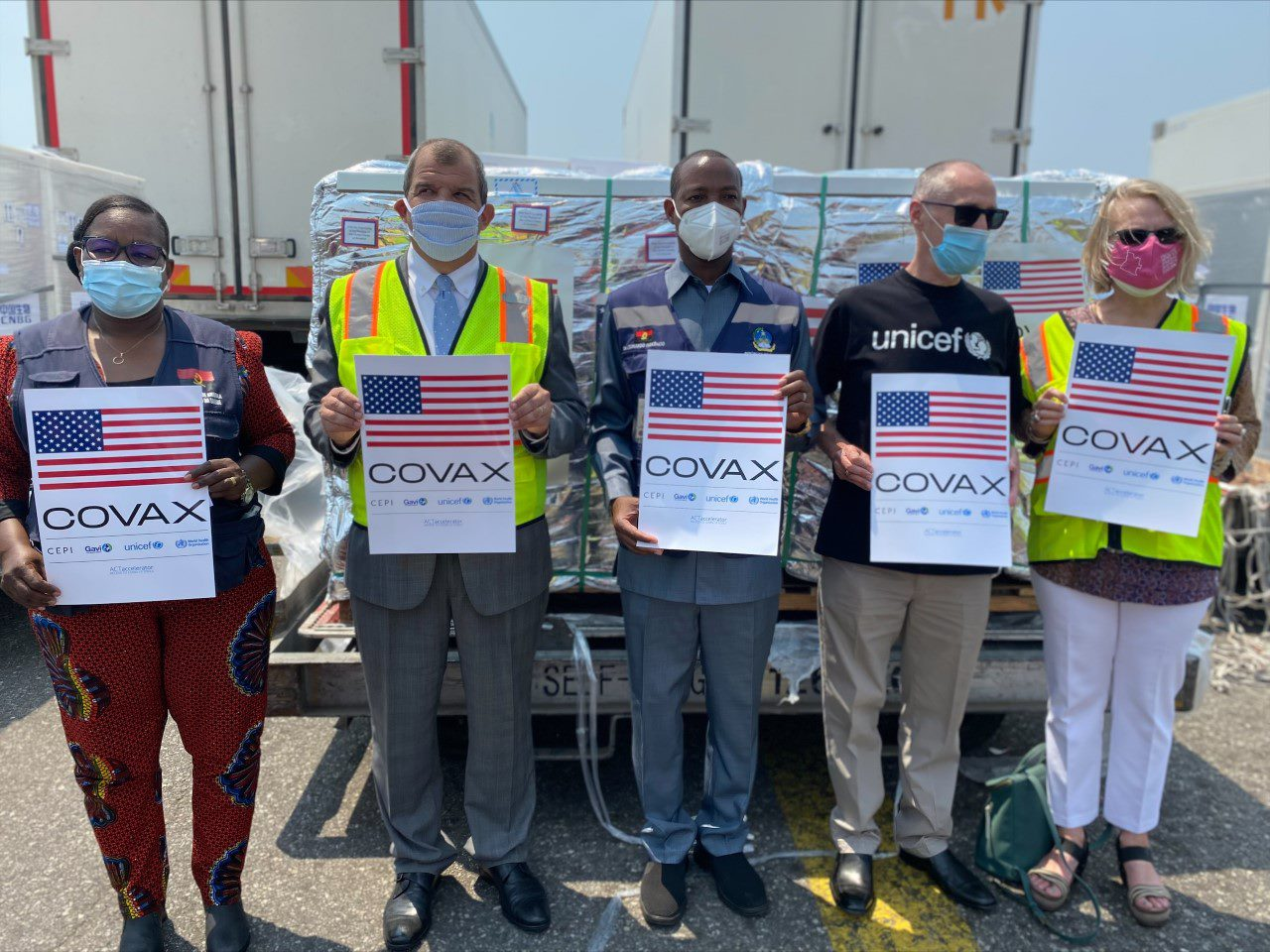
The US delivers vaccines to Angola as part of the COVAX program in 2021

- There were 9,703 new cases in September, taking the total number of confirmed cases to 57,247. The death toll rose to 1548. The number of recovered patients increased to 47,950, leaving 7,749 active cases at the end of the month.

=== October to December 2021 ===
- There were 7,186 new cases in October, bringing the total number of confirmed cases to 64,433. The death toll rose to 1710. The number of recovered patients increased to 53,343, leaving 9,380 active cases at the end of the month.
- There were 735 new cases in November, bringing the total number of confirmed cases to 65,168. The death toll rose to 1733. The number of recovered patients increased to 63,214, leaving 221 active cases at the end of the month.
- The presence of the omicron variant was confirmed on 24 December.
- There were 16,425 new cases in December, raising the total number of confirmed cases to 81,593. The death toll rose to 1770. The number of recovered patients increased to 64,533, leaving 15,290 active cases at the end of the month. Modelling by WHO's Regional Office for Africa suggests that due to under-reporting, the true cumulative number of infections by the end of 2021 was around 14.8 million while the true number of COVID-19 deaths was around 10890.

=== January to March 2022 ===
- There were 16,523 new cases in January, raising the total number of confirmed cases to 98,116. The death toll rose to 1895. The number of recovered patients increased to 94,978, leaving 1593 active cases at the end of the month.
- There were 625 new cases in February, bringing the total number of confirmed cases to 98,741. The death toll rose to 1900. The number of recovered patients increased to 96,680, leaving 161 active cases at the end of the month.
- There were 407 new cases in March, bringing the total number of confirmed cases to 99,148. The death toll remained unchanged. The number of recovered patients increased to 97,125, leaving 123 active cases at the end of the month.

=== April to June 2022 ===
- There were 46 new cases in April, bringing the total number of confirmed cases to 99,194. The death toll remained unchanged. The number of recovered patients increased to 97,149, leaving 145 active cases at the end of the month.
- There were 606 new cases in May, bringing the total number of confirmed cases to 99,800. The death toll remained unchanged.
- There were 1520 new cases in June, bringing the total number of confirmed cases to 101,320. The death toll remained unchanged.

=== July to December 2022 ===
- There were 1112 new cases in July, bringing the total number of confirmed cases to 102,432. The death toll rose to 1916.
- There were 204 new cases in August, bringing the total number of confirmed cases to 102,636. The death toll rose to 1917.
- There were 495 new cases in September, bringing the total number of confirmed cases to 103,131. The death toll remained unchanged. The number of recovered patients increased to 101,155, leaving 59 active cases at the end of the month.
- There were 1323 new cases in November, bringing the total number of confirmed cases to 104,454. The death toll rose to 1922.
- There were 641 new cases in December, bringing the total number of confirmed cases to 105,095. The death toll rose to 1930. The number of recovered patients increased to 103,050, leaving 115 active cases at the end of the month.

=== 2023 ===
- There were 2,038 confirmed cases in 2023, bringing the total number of cases to 107,133. The death toll rose to 1937.

== Statistics ==
=== Charts ===
==== Confirmed new cases per day ====
View source data.

==== Confirmed deaths per day ====
View source data.

== See also ==
- COVID-19 pandemic in Africa
- COVID-19 pandemic by country and territory

== Economics ==
During the pandemic Chinese creditors provided Angola with a three-year moratorium on its development loan payments.
