= List of sovereign wealth funds by country =

This is a list of sovereign wealth funds by country. A sovereign wealth fund (SWF) is a fund owned by a state (or a political subdivision of a state) composed of financial assets such as stocks, bonds, property or other financial instruments. Sovereign wealth funds are entities that manage the national savings for the purposes of investment. The accumulated funds may have their origin in, or may represent, foreign currency deposits, foreign exchange reserves, gold, special drawing rights (SDRs) and International Monetary Fund (IMF) reserve position held by central banks and monetary authorities, along with other national assets such as pension investments, oil funds, or other industrial and financial holdings. These are assets of the sovereign nations which are typically held in reserves domestic and reserve foreign currencies such as the dollar, euro, pound sterling and yen. The names attributed to the management entities may include state-owned (federal, state and provincial) central banks, national monetary authorities, official investment companies, sovereign oil funds, pension funds, among others.

Some countries may have more than one SWF. In the United States, several states have their own SWFs. In February 2025, President Donald Trump signed an executive order to establish a national sovereign wealth fund. The list does not include pension funds that do not meet the SWF criteria.

== List ==
Country	Funds	Assets (billions USD)	Origin
China	China–Africa Development Fund; China Investment Corporation; National Social Security Fund; SAFE Investment Company; CNIC Corporation Limited; Beijing State-owned Assets Management; Shanghai Municipal Investment Group; Central Huijin Investment; Linfen Investment Group	3,623-4,117	Non-commodity
United Arab Emirates	Managed by the Federal Government of the UAE: Emirates Investment Authority; Managed by the Emirate of Abu Dhabi: Abu Dhabi Developmental Holding Company; Abu Dhabi Investment Authority; Mubadala Investment Company; Managed by the Emirate of Dubai: Dubai World; Investment Corporation of Dubai; Managed by the Emirate of Ras Al Khaimah: Ras Al Khaimah Investment Authority; Managed by the Emirate of Sharjah: Sharjah Assets Management Fujairah Holdings	2,489-2,841	Oil & Gas; Non-commodity
Norway	Government Pension Fund of Norway	2,327-2,499	Oil & Gas
Singapore	Monetary Authority of Singapore; Government of Singapore Investment Corporation; Temasek Holdings; Central Provident Fund	1,572-2,185	Non-commodity
Canada	CPP Investments Canada Strong Fund; Province-level entities: Alberta Investment Management Corporation; Alberta Heritage Savings Trust Fund; BC Pension Corporation; La Caisse; Investment Saskatchewan; Ontario Municipal Employees Retirement System; Ontario Teachers' Pension Plan; Public Sector Pension Investment Board	2,013	Oil & Gas; Non-commodity
Saudi Arabia	Public Investment Fund; National Development Fund	1,281	Oil & Gas
Kuwait	Kuwait Investment Authority; Gulf Investment Corporation; Wafra International Investment Company	1,029	Oil & Gas
Indonesia	Indonesia Investment Authority; Danantara Indonesia Sovereign Fund; Government Investment Unit of Indonesia	900	Mineral, Non-commodity
Qatar	Qatar Investment Authority	600	Oil & Gas
Hong Kong	HK SAR Exchange Fund (HK MAS); Hong Kong Investment Corporation (Note: Hong Kong Government's stake in the Mass Transit Railway Corporation (MTRCL) and the Airport Authority (AA), both of which also invest and operate outside Hong Kong's border, are not included.)	569	Non-commodity
Turkey	Turkey Wealth Fund	442	Non-commodity
Australia	Future Fund; Queensland Investment Corporation; Victorian Funds Management Corporation; New South Wales Treasury Corporation; Western Australia Future Health Research and Innovation Fund	357	Non-commodity
United States	United States sovereign wealth fund State-level entities: Alabama Trust Fund; Alaska Permanent Fund; Coal Severance Tax Trust Fund & Public School Trust (Montana); Louisiana Education Quality Trust Fund; New Mexico State Investment Council Permanent Funds; North Dakota Legacy Fund; Oregon Common School Fund; Texas Permanent School Fund; Texas Permanent University Fund; State School Fund (Utah); West Virginia Future Fund; Wyoming Permanent/Endowment Funds	332	Oil & Gas; Non-commodity; Minerals; Public Lands
South Korea	Korea Investment Corporation	232	Non-commodity
Iran	National Development Fund of Iran	195	Oil & Gas
Russia	Russian National Wealth Fund; Russian Direct Investment Fund	174	Oil & Gas; Non-commodity
Kazakhstan	Samruk-Kazyna; National Investment Corporation	155.1	Oil & Gas
Malaysia	Khazanah Nasional; Permodalan Nasional Berhad; Lembaga Tabung Angkatan Tentera; Sarawak Sovereign Wealth Future Fund	119.0	Non-commodity
Azerbaijan	Azerbaijan Investment Holding; State Oil Fund of Azerbaijan	75.0	Oil & Gas
Brunei	Brunei Investment Agency	73.0	Oil & Gas
Tanzania	Natural Gas Revenue Fund	66.4	Oil & Gas
Oman	Oman Investment Authority	60.0	Oil & Gas; Non-commodity
Ethiopia	Ethiopian Investment Holdings	46.0	Non-commodity
Libya	Libyan Investment Authority	38.8	Oil & Gas
Ireland	Ireland Strategic Investment Fund; Future Ireland Fund; Infrastructure, Climate and Nature Fund	38.5	Non-commodity
United Kingdom	National Wealth Fund (United Kingdom)	37.0	Non-commodity
Austria	Österreichische Beteiligungs AG	32.0	Non-commodity
New Zealand	New Zealand Superannuation Fund	27.0	Non-commodity
Chile	Economic and Social Stabilization Fund; Pension Reserve Fund	21.0	Copper
Bahrain	Mumtalakat Holding Company	18.6	Oil & Gas
Timor-Leste	Timor-Leste Petroleum Fund	17.0	Oil & Gas
Zimbabwe	Mutapa Investment Fund	16.0	Minerals
India	National Investment and Infrastructure Fund; Tamil Nadu Industrial Development Corporation	12.4	Non-commodity
Colombia	Fondo de Ahorro y Estabilización Petrolera; Fideicomiso Fondo de Ahorro y Estabilización	12.0	Oil & Gas
Greece	Growthfund	12.0	Non-commodity
Japan	Japan Investment Corporation	12.0	
Egypt	The Sovereign Fund of Egypt	11.9	Non-commodity
Italy	CDP Equity, Fondo nazionale del Made in Italy	11.0	Oil & Gas; Non-commodity
Philippines	Maharlika Investment Fund	9.20	Non-commodity
Pakistan	Pakistan Sovereign Wealth Fund	8.00	Oil & Gas; Non-commodity
Mexico	Fondo Mexicano del Petroleo para la Estabilizacion y el Desarrollo	7.00	Oil & Gas
Spain	CofidesSociedad Estatal de Participaciones Industriales	6.00	Non-commodity
Trinidad and Tobago	The Heritage and Stabilization Fund	6.00	Oil & Gas
Peru	Fiscal Stabilization Fund	5.00	Non-commodity
Angola	Fundo Soberano de Angola	5.00	Oil & Gas
Botswana	Pula Fund	4.90	Diamonds
Mongolia	Chinggis Fund; Future Heritage Fund; Fiscal Stability Fund	4.00	Minerals
Denmark	Danish Growth Fund; Export and Investment Fund of Denmark	4.00	Non-commodity
Israel	Israeli Citizens' Fund	2.08	Oil & Gas; Minerals
Nigeria	Nigeria Sovereign Investment Authority; Bayelsa Development and Investment Corporation	2.00	Oil & Gas
Ghana	Ghana Petroleum Funds; Ghana Infrastructure Investment Fund Minerals Income Investment Fund	2.00	Oil & Gas Minerals
Gabon	Fonds Gabonais d’Investissements Stratégiques	1.89	Oil & Gas
Panama	Fondo de Ahorro de Panamá	1.40	Non-commodity
Vietnam	State Capital Investment Corporation	1.20	Non-commodity
Senegal	Fonds Souverain d'Investissements Stratégiques	1.20	Non-commodity
Kiribati	Revenue Equalization Reserve Fund	1.00	Phosphates
Bolivia	Fondo para la Revolución Industrial Productiva	0.40	Non-commodity
Tuvalu	Tuvalu Trust Fund Consolidated Investment Fund	0.33	
Brazil	Fundo Soberano de Estado do Espirito Santo	0.20	Oil & Gas
Mauritania	National des Revenus des Hydrocarbures	0.10	Oil & Gas
Equatorial Guinea	Réserves pour Générations Futures	0.10	
Sweden	Förvaltningsaktiebolaget Stattum		
Nauru	Nauru Phosphate Royalties Trust		Phosphate
Portugal	Parpública		
Finland	Solidium		
Kenya	Sovereign Wealth Fund		

== See also ==
- List of U.S. states by sovereign wealth funds
