= List of U.S. states by sovereign wealth funds =

Like many countries, several U.S. states have created sovereign wealth funds to finance certain services (typically public education) or to provide general revenue to the state government itself. This article comprises the known such funds and their monetary amounts.

== Table ==
| Rank | State | Fund | Assets | | | Origin |
| Rank | State | Fund | Value (in billions) | As of | Ref. | Origin |
|---|---|---|---|---|---|---|
| 1 | Alaska | Alaska Permanent Fund | 83.5 | June 2025 | | Petroleum |
| 2 | Texas | Permanent School Fund | 55.624 | August 2022 | | Commodity, petroleum |
| 3 | Texas | Permanent University Fund | 31.763 | August 2022 | | Commodity, petroleum |
| 4 | New Mexico | New Mexico State Investment Council Permanent Funds | 100.3 | June 2026 | | Petroleum |
| 5 | Wyoming | Wyoming Permanent Mineral Trust Fund | 12.6 | October 2025 | | Coal, petroleum, natural gas, shale oil |
| 6 | North Dakota | North Dakota Legacy Fund | 8.2 | November 2022 | | Petroleum |
| 7 | Alabama | Alabama Trust Fund | 2.5 | June 2016 | | Petroleum |
| 8 | Utah | State School Fund | 2.0 | March 2015 | | Public lands |
| 9 | Louisiana | Louisiana Education Quality Trust Fund | 1.6 | June 2021 | | Petroleum |
| 10 | Oregon | Oregon Common School Fund | 1.4 | December 2016 | | Public lands |
| 11 | Montana | Coal Severance Tax Trust Fund & Public School Trust | 1.2 | June 2016 | | Fossil fuels, public lands |

== See also ==
- List of countries by sovereign wealth funds
