= SCIC =

SCIC may refer to:

- Directorate-General for Interpretation, abbreviated after its former French name Service Commun Interprétation-Conférences
- Société Centrale Immobilière de la Caisse des dépôts, the predecessor of real-estate investment company Icade
- SCiC HQ, Headquarters of the Supreme Commander-in-Chief of Ukraine
- the Supreme Council of Islamic Courts, another name for the Islamic Courts Union
- State Capital Investment Corporation, a state-owned company in Vietnam
- Scic, an Italian road bicycle racing team 1969–1979
- Spinal Cord Injury Centre
