= RERF =

RERF may refer to:

- Radiation Effects Research Foundation, Japan
- Revenue Equalization Reserve Fund, Kiribati
