= Wyoming Permanent Mineral Trust Fund =

US State of Wyoming sovereign wealth fund

The Wyoming Permanent Mineral Trust Fund (WPMTF) is a sovereign wealth fund of the U.S. state of Wyoming. Established in 1975 by constitutional amendment, it is funded by a 1.5 percent severance tax on "coal, petroleum, natural gas, oil shale, and such other minerals". The fund is managed by the Wyoming State Treasurer. In 2025, the fund has a reported market value of over $12 billion.

Each year, 5 percent of the WPMTF's average annual market value from the previous five years can be spent through the Wyoming General Fund.

== History ==
During the 1889 Wyoming Constitutional Convention, severance taxes on natural resources were discussed by delegates, but were not adopted. In 1924, a proposed constitutional amendment on implementing a severance tax was narrowly defeated. A 1974 constitutional amendment passed with 78,842 votes in favor of the constitutional amendment and 32,414 against.

With a reported value of $12,371,201,462 as of October 2025, the WPMTF constituted the largest single fund in the state's investment portfolio, accounting for 37% of the state portfolio's total market value. Other funds in the portfolio include the Permanent Land Funds and the Workers Compensation Fund.

== Constitutional text ==
The Legislature shall provide by law for an excise tax on the privilege of severing or extracting minerals, of one and one-half percent (1 1/2%) on the value of the gross product extracted. The minerals subject to such excise tax shall be coal, petroleum, natural gas, oil shale, and such other minerals as may be designated by the Legislature. Such tax shall be in addition to any other excise, severance or ad valorem tax. The proceeds from such tax shall be deposited in the Permanent Wyoming Mineral Trust Fund. The fund, including all monies deposited in the fund from whatever source, shall remain inviolate. The monies in the fund shall be invested as prescribed by the Legislature and all income from fund investments shall be deposited by the State Treasurer in the general fund on an annual basis. The Legislature may also specify by law, conditions and terms under which monies in the fund may be loaned to political subdivisions of the state.

— Article 15, Section 19 Mineral excise tax; distribution. Wyoming Constitution

== Spending cap ==
All investment income from the WPMTF is constitutionally required to be transferred annually to the Wyoming General Fund. In 2004, Wyoming Statute § 9-4-719 established a spending cap, the Spending Policy Amount, on the WPMTF's investment earnings of 5 percent of the fund's prior five-year average market value, with the any amounts greater than that being returned by the general fund to the WPMTF Reserve Account.

A 2012 WyoFile analysis found that the WPMTF accounted for an average of 18.6% of general fund revenue between 1987 and 2011. In the Wyoming 2023-2024 budget, the WPMTF provided $525.8 million in revenue.

== Reported fund value ==
Year	Market Value	Ref
2025	$11,908,783,257	
2024	$11,130,390,650	
2023	$10,047,920,630	
2022	$8,834,499,093	
2021	$9,391,475,140	
2020	$7,990,840,637	

== Discussion ==
In 2014, state senator Charles Scott (R-Casper), called the WPMTF, "Perhaps the smartest financial move the people of Wyoming have ever made," arguing that "the income from the fund is available to help the state meet its essential obligations when economic times are tough, reducing the need to raise taxes." In an interview with Wyoming Public Radio, then-State Treasurer Mark Gordon, praised the WPMTF as a "significant revenue generator for the state."

Others have questioned the fund's role in Wyoming's budgeting practices. Writer and lecturer Samuel Western called the fund a "mixed blessing" in 2012, suggesting that the WPMTF has "kept Wyoming complacent in its quest for economic diversification" A 2022 article in the California Journal of Politics and Policy by Robert A. Schuhmann and Jeffrey Jensen of the University of Wyoming observed, "There seems little incentive to diversify the [Wyoming] tax structure with the relatively high percentage of interest from the WPMTF used for the General Fund."

== See also ==
- List of U.S. states by sovereign wealth funds
- Sovereign wealth fund
- Wyoming Constitution
- Curt Meier (incumbent Wyoming Treasurer)
