= The Sovereign Fund of Egypt =

The Sovereign Fund of Egypt صندوق مصر السيادي
- Type: Sovereign wealth fund
- Industry: Investment
- Founded: 2018; 8 years ago
- Headquarters: Cairo, Egypt
- Key people: Noha Khalil (Acting CEO); Hassas El Khatib (Chairman)
- Total assets: 12 billion $
- Owner: Egypt
- Website: tsfe.com

The Sovereign Fund of Egypt (Arabic: صندوق مصر السيادي) is a sovereign wealth fund, owned by the Arab Republic of Egypt, Its established in 2018 by Law No. 177 of 2018 and amended by Law No. 177 of 2020, with the aim of contributing to the financial economic development of Egypt through the management of funds and assets owned or transferred to it, as well as investing in many different economic activities.

The Fund's Board of Directors consists of a non-executive chairman who is the Minister of Planning and Economic Development, the membership of the executive director of the Fund, and representatives from the Ministry of Planning, Ministry of Finance, the Central Bank of Egypt, and the General Authority for Investment and Free Zones, in addition to seven independent members with experience.

The Sovereign Fund of Egypt includes four affiliated subfunds operating in many fields, In 2020, The Sovereign Fund of Egypt ranked 43rd among 93 sovereign wealth funds globally in terms of asset size in a set of rankings created by the Sovereign Wealth Fund Institute, The capital of the fund is about 11.2 billion US dollars.

In September 2024, Noha Khalil was appointed as acting CEO after Ayman Soliman stepped down. In October 2024, the Minister of Investment and Foreign Trade Hassan El Khatib was named chairperson of the board of directors of TSFE.

In February 2025, the government of Egypt announced the plan to transfer state-owned enterprises to TSFE. The first phase of the plan is set to include 370 enterprises.

== Sub-funds ==
The Sovereign Fund of Egypt is included on four affiliated sub-funds:

- TSFE Tourism, Real estate & Antiquities sub-fund.
- TSFE Healthcare & Pharma sub-fund.
- TSFE Infrastructure & Utilities sub-fund.
- TSFE Financial Services & Fintech sub-fund.

== Investments ==
- The fund participates in green hydrogen projects inside Egypt.
- It has owned The Mogamma, the land of the former National Party, the Global Village, the land of the Ministry of Interior in Cairo.
- It has owned a part of the three power stations in Egypt created by Siemens (Borollos, New Administrative Capital, and Beni Suef).
- It has owned 100% in Misr Insurance Holding Company.

== See also ==
- Economy of Egypt
- List of countries by sovereign wealth funds
