= Pula Fund =

Sovereign wealth fund of Botswana

- Type: State-owned
- Founded: November 1993; 32 years ago
- AUM: US$4.1 billion (2023)
- Owner: Bank of Botswana
- Website: www.bankofbotswana.bw/content/pula-fund

The Pula Fund is the sovereign wealth fund of Botswana. As of December 2024, the fund has US$3.5 billion in assets under management.

== History ==
The Pula Fund was established in November 1993, to invest surplus revenues from diamond exports.

In 1997, the fund was re-established in its current form, under the Bank of Botswana Act 1996 with the objective of providing greater flexibility in the management of international reserves, and greater certainty in the forecasting of annual “dividend” payments to the government from the Bank of Botswana.

In 2008, the fund agreed to the Santiago Principles, a series of guidelines on best practices for sovereign wealth funds.

As of 2015, the fund has assets valued at $7 billion.

Prior to May 2019, the fund was restricted to investing in United States dollars, Pound sterling, Japanese yen, and euros. In May 2019, the Bank of Botswana eased these restrictions, increasing the number of eligible currencies to 17.

In July 2020, the Bank of Botswana announced it would be seeking legislation to limit access to the fund, as the fund was being accessed by governments to meet budget deficits, leading to a steady fall in the fund's reserves.

== Corporate governance ==
In order to achieve its statutory objectives, the Bank of Botswana is directed by a board of directors. All departments and the division are responsible to the governor through the chief operating officer, the general Counsel and the deputy governor. The Bank's executive committee meets fortnightly and is chaired by the Governor. The work of the bank is also coordinated by a number of committees.

=== Board of Directors ===
The board of directors is composed of the members listed below:

- M. D. Pelalo – Governor
- K. Molosi – Member
- L. Lisenda – Member
- O. Masimega – Member
- B. M Ditlhabi – Member
- L. G. Makepe – Member
- D. K. Briscoe – Member

=== Executive Committee ===
The executive committee is composed of the members listed below:

- M. D. Pelaelo – Governor
- K. S. Masalila – Deputy Governor
- T. A. Kganetsano – Deputy Governor
- R. H. Nlebesi – Chief Operating Officer
- E. T. Rakhudu – General Counsel
- S. M. Sealetsa – Advisor, Banking & Currency Digitisation
- G.S Seganabeng – Banking, Currency & Settlement
- P. C. Tumedi – Business Conduct and Regulatory Compliance
- J. Selwe – Corporate Management Services
- G. Baatlholeng – Deposit Insurance Scheme
- D. N. Loeto – Finance
- L. C. Moseki – Financial Markets
- C. S. G Chepete – Human Capital
- J. Ghanie – Information & Communications Technology
- K. M. Mothusi – Internal Audit Services
- M. Kgokgothwane – Protective Services
- G. Ngidi – Prudential Authority & Payments Oversight
- L. S. Senatla – Statistics, Data Management & Analytics
- I. Molalapata – Research & Financial Stability
- A. B. Kgathola – Strategic Planning & Risk Management

== See also ==
- List of countries by sovereign wealth funds
- Economy of Botswana
- Mining industry of Botswana
