= Zschernig v. Miller =

- Supreme Court of the United States

Argued November 7, 1967 Decided January 15, 1968
- Full case name: Zschernig v. Miller
- Citations: 389 U.S. 429 (more) 88 S. Ct. 664; 19 L. Ed. 2d 683; 1968 U.S. LEXIS 2714

Case history
- Prior: 243 Or. 567; 412 P.2d 781; 415 P.2d 15 (1966); probable jurisdiction noted, 386 U.S. 1030 (1967).

Holding
- A state statute allowing an alien to inherit only if his domestic law satisfies one of the specified conditions is unconstitutional because it intrudes into the federal realm of foreign affairs.

Court membership
- Chief Justice Earl Warren Associate Justices Hugo Black · William O. Douglas; John M. Harlan II · William J. Brennan Jr. Potter Stewart · Byron White; Abe Fortas · Thurgood Marshall

Case opinions
- Majority: Douglas, joined by Warren, Black, Brennan, Stewart, Fortas
- Concurrence: Stewart, joined by Brennan
- Concurrence: Harlan (in judgment)
- Dissent: White
- Marshall took no part in the consideration or decision of the case.

Zschernig v. Miller, 389 U.S. 429 (1968), was a case in which the Supreme Court of the United States invalidated an Oregon statute for unconstitutionally intruding into the federal realm of foreign affairs even though the statute did not conflict with any federal treaty or statute.

== Introduction ==
An Oregon resident died and their only heirs were residents of East Germany. When the heirs tried to claim their inheritance, the State Land Board attempted to escheat the funds because East Germany would not allow the inheritance if the countries involved were reversed.

== Facts of the case ==
The Oregon law at issue in the case provided that a nonresident alien could not inherit property from an Oregon decedent unless: 1) the alien's government granted Americans the right to inherit on the same terms as its own citizens, 2) the alien's government gave Americans the right to receive payment in the U.S. from foreign funds, and 3) the alien was able to receive "the benefit, use or control" of the Oregon bequest "without confiscation" by the alien's government.

== Decision ==
The court found the law unconstitutional because of "intrusion by the State into the field of foreign affairs which the Constitution entrusts to the President and the Congress." The Supreme Court applied Zschernig in American Insurance Association v. Garamendi, a 2003 case, although they relied more on Justice Harlan's concurring opinion in Zschernig than on the majority's reasoning.

== See also ==
- American Insurance Association v. Garamendi (2003): case over California law with foreign policy implications
