= Natural Gas Revenue Fund =

Tanzanian sovereign wealth fund

- Native name: Mfuko wa Mapato ya Gesi Asilia
- Company type: Sovereign wealth fund
- Founded: 2015
- Headquarters: Dar es Salaam, Tanzania
- AUM: TBD
- Owner: Tanzanian Government

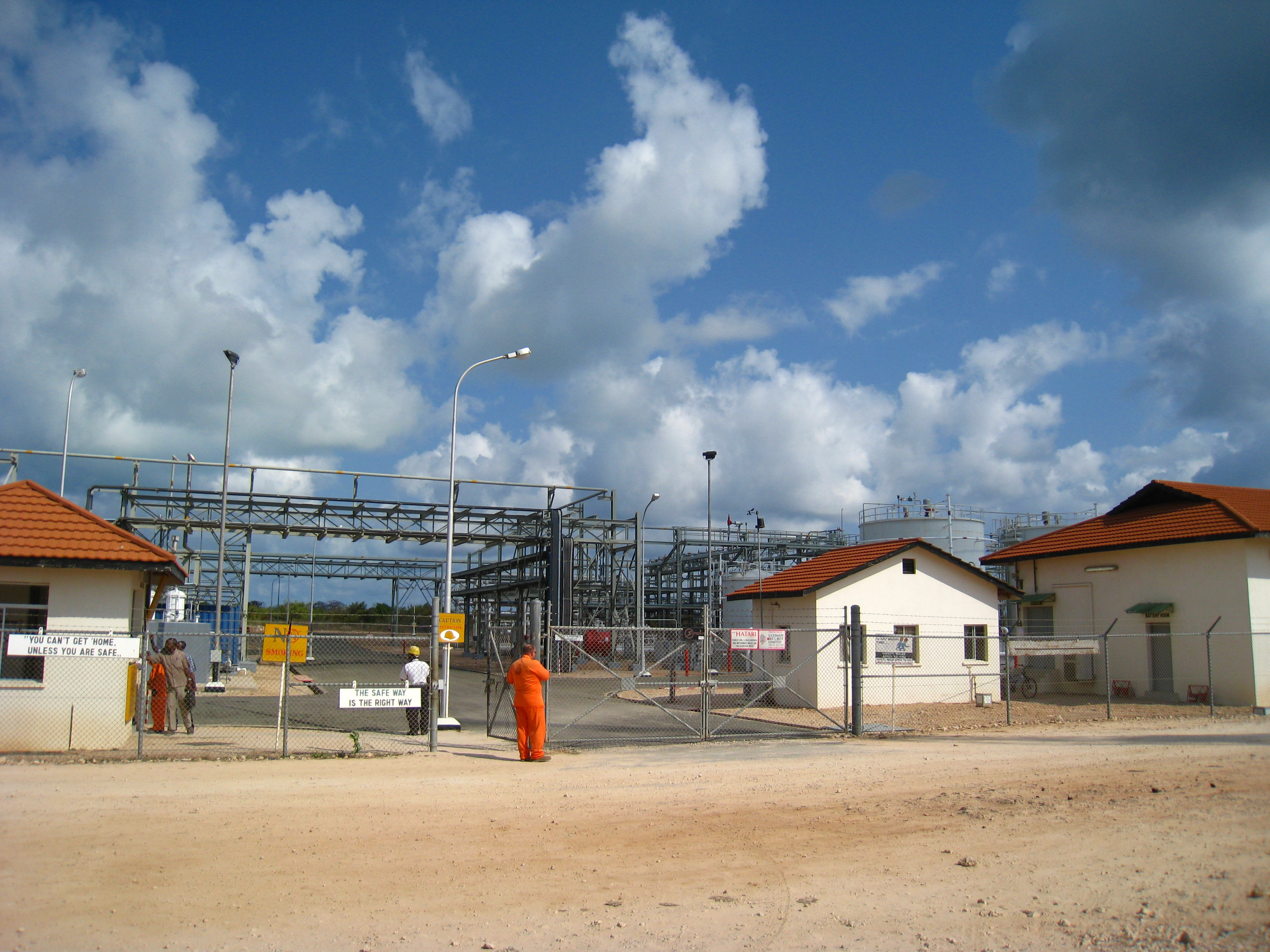
Songo Songo Gas Plant

The Natural Gas Revenue Fund (NGRF) is the sovereign wealth fund of Tanzania launched in 2015 after the enactment of a bill by the National Assembly. It manages the revenue accrued from the sale of its natural gas. As of April 2014, Tanzania has a recoverable gas reserve of 43.1 tcf. The fund is managed by the Bank of Tanzania. However, according to PFC Energy, 25 to 30 trillion cubic feet of recoverable natural gas resources have been discovered in Tanzania since 2010.

== See also ==
- Economy of Tanzania
