= Oregon Department of State Lands =

Government agency

The Department of State Lands (DSL), one of the oldest agencies of government of the U.S. state of Oregon, is principally responsible for the management of lands under state ownership, as its name implies. Unlike most other department-level state agencies, it is not headed by a sole elected official, but is the administrative arm of the Oregon State Land Board. Although established by the Constitution, subsequent statutes have added to its duties and authority, and include some provisions relating to its conduct. In addition to managing state-owned lands, the Board through the Department is responsible for the Common School Fund, off-shore lands and coastal estuarine tidelands, submerged and submersible lands of the navigable waterways, and additional functions assigned by the Oregon Legislative Assembly from time to time. The Board decides cases, adopts rules, issues policy statements, and approves DSL recommendations.

== History ==
The State Land Board was established in 1859 as the "Board of Commissioners for the sale of school, and University lands, and for the investment of the funds arising therefrom." It has been composed of the same three constitutional officers from its inception. Upon Oregon's admission to the union, the federal government ceded to the state two sections of each township to generate revenues for a Common School Fund, a trust fund for support and maintenance of public schools. 500,000 acres (2,000 km^{2}) had previously been allowed to Oregon by an 1841 act of Congress, and 5% of all proceeds from the sale of federal land. The Board was established to manage these and other assets accruing to the Fund.

In 1968, The State Land Board went before the U.S. Supreme Court to defend escheating an inheritance because the heirs lived in East Germany which would not reciprocate and provide an inheritance to American heirs if the situation were reversed. In Zschernig v. Miller, the court found the law unconstitutional because of "intrusion by the State into the field of foreign affairs which the Constitution entrusts to the President and the Congress."

== Organization ==
=== State Land Board ===
The State Land Board, composed of the Governor, Secretary of State, and Treasurer, has ultimate constitutional and statutory responsibility for the matters within the purview of the Department. It sets the policies, decides cases and adopts rules, and DSL recommendations are subject to Board approval.

=== Director ===
The Department of State Lands' chief administrator is a Director appointed by the State Land Board. The Director manages the day-to-day affairs of the agency and serves at the will of the Board. The current director is Kaitlin Lovell, who was appointed under the administration of Governor Tina Kotek in 2025.

=== Divisions ===
- Policy and Planning
- Field Operations
- Finance and Administration
