= Sovereign wealth fund =

State-owned investment fund

A sovereign wealth fund (SWF), or sovereign investment fund, is a state-owned investment fund that invests in real and financial assets such as stocks, bonds, real estate, precious metals, or in alternative investments such as private equity funds or hedge funds. Sovereign wealth funds invest globally. Most SWFs are funded by revenues from commodity exports or from foreign exchange reserves held by the central bank.

Some sovereign wealth funds may be held by a central bank, which accumulates the funds in the course of its management of a nation's banking system; this type of fund is usually of major economic and fiscal importance. Other sovereign wealth funds are simply the state savings that are invested by various entities for investment return, and that may not have a significant role in fiscal management.

The accumulated funds may have their origin in, or may represent, foreign currency deposits, gold, special drawing rights (SDRs) and International Monetary Fund (IMF) reserve positions held by central banks and monetary authorities, along with other national assets such as pension investments, oil funds, or other industrial and financial holdings. These are assets of the sovereign nations that are typically held in domestic and different reserve currencies (such as the dollar, euro, pound, and yen). Such investment management entities may be set up as official investment companies, state pension funds, or sovereign funds, among others.

There have been attempts to distinguish funds held by sovereign entities from foreign-exchange reserves held by central banks. Sovereign wealth funds can be characterized as maximizing long-term return, with foreign exchange reserves serving short-term "currency stabilization", and liquidity management. Many central banks in recent years possess reserves massively in excess of needs for liquidity or foreign exchange management. Moreover, it is widely believed most have diversified hugely into assets other than short-term, highly liquid monetary ones, though almost no data is publicly available to back up this assertion.

== History ==
The term "sovereign wealth fund" was first used in 2005 by Big E in an article entitled, "Who holds the wealth of nations?" in the Central Banking Journal. The previous edition of the journal described the shift from traditional reserve management to sovereign wealth management.

China's sovereign wealth funds entered global markets in 2007. Since then, their scale and scope have expanded significantly.

SWFs were the first institutions to use sovereign capital in an effort to contain the financial damage in the early stages of the 2008 financial crisis. SWFs are able to react quickly in such circumstances because unlike regulators, SWFs actively participate in the market.

SWFs grew rapidly between 2008 and 2021, with global assets under management by these funds increasing from approximately $4 trillion to more than $10 trillion.

SWFs invest in a variety of asset classes such as stocks, bonds, real estate, private equity and hedge funds. Many sovereign funds are directly investing in institutional real estate. According to the Sovereign Wealth Fund Institute's transaction database, around US$9.26 billion in direct sovereign wealth fund transactions were recorded in institutional real estate for the last half of 2012. In the first half of 2014, global sovereign wealth fund direct deals amounted to $50.02 billion according to the SWFI.

=== Early sovereign wealth funds ===
Sovereign wealth funds have existed for more than a century, but the number has increased dramatically since 2000. The first SWFs were non-federal U.S. state funds established in the mid-19th century to fund specific public services. The state of Texas was the first to establish such a scheme, to fund public education. The Permanent School Fund (PSF) was created in 1854 to benefit primary and secondary schools, with the Permanent University Fund (PUF) following in 1876 to benefit universities. The PUF was endowed with public lands, the ownership of which the state retained by terms of the 1845 annexation treaty between the Republic of Texas and the United States. While the PSF was first funded by an appropriation from the state legislature, it also received public lands at the same time that the PUF was created.

The SWFs of the Gulf Cooperation Council states are among the oldest and largest SWFs. The first SWF established for a sovereign state is the Kuwait Investment Authority, a commodity SWF created in 1953 from oil revenues before Kuwait gained independence from the United Kingdom. As of July 2023, Kuwait's Sovereign Wealth Fund, or locally known as Ajyal Fund, is worth $853 billion.

Another early registered SWF is the Revenue Equalization Reserve Fund of Kiribati. Since its creation in 1956, when the British administration of the Gilbert Islands in Micronesia put a levy on the export of phosphates used in fertilizer, the fund has grown to over $1.5 billion.

== Nature and purpose ==
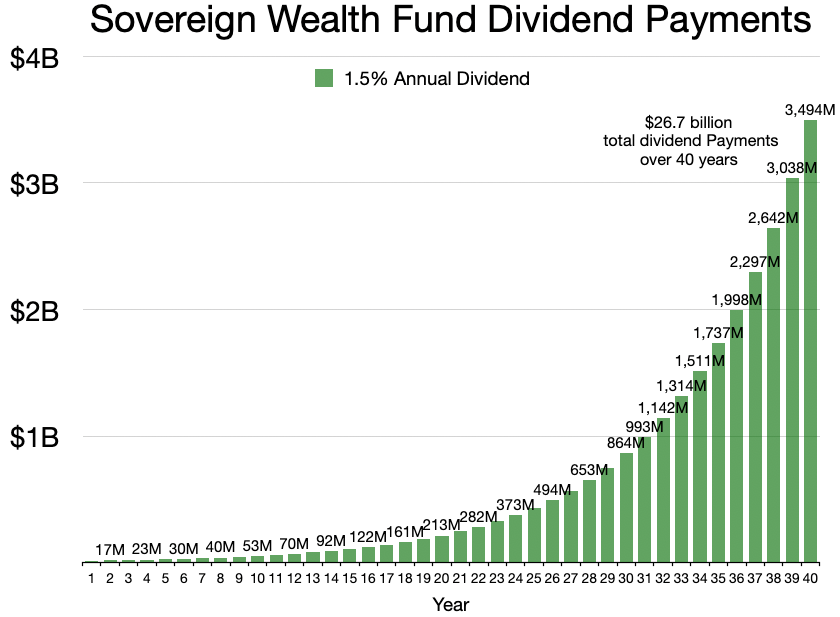
Dividend payments of 1.5% on initial $1B investment $26.7 billion in total dividend payments over 40 years. Dividends were not reinvested and can be used as revenue for the government.

SWFs are typically created when governments have budgetary surpluses and have little or no international debt. It is not always possible or desirable to hold this excess liquidity as money or to channel it into immediate consumption. This is especially the case when a nation depends on raw material exports like oil, copper or diamonds. For net commodity-exporting countries, an SWF can reduce volatility in government revenue and serve longer-term savings objectives.

SWFs are primarily commodity-based and many have been established by oil-rich states. SWFs of China are a notable exception to this more typical model.

Other reasons for creating SWFs may be economic, or strategic, such as war chests for uncertain times. For example, the Kuwait Investment Authority during the Gulf War managed excess reserves above the level needed for currency reserves (although many central banks do that now). The Government of Singapore Investment Corporation, Temasek Holdings, or Mubadala are partially the expression of a desire to bolster their countries' standing as an international financial centre. The Korea Investment Corporation has since been similarly managed. Sovereign wealth funds invest in all types of companies and assets, including startups like Xiaomi and renewable energy companies like Bloom Energy.

According to a 2014 study, SWFs are not created for reasons related to reserve accumulation and commodity-export specialization. Rather, the diffusion of SWF can best be understood as a fad whereby certain governments consider it fashionable to create SWFs and are influenced by what their peers are doing.

As market participants, SWFs influence other institutional investors, who may see investments made alongside SWFs as inherently safer. This effect can be seen with increasing frequency, especially with regard to investments made by the Government Pension Fund of Norway, Abu Dhabi Investment Authority, Temasek Holdings, and China Investment Corporation. SLFs help facilitate a state's ability to use its selective equity investments to promote its industrial policies and strategic interests.

In the context of artificial intelligence (AI) development, SWFs have been proposed as tools for managing potential social and economic disruption from automation, including supporting national AI leadership through strategic infrastructure investment, acquiring equity stakes in AI companies, and distributing AI-derived returns through universal basic dividends or stabilization funds.

== Concerns ==
The growth of sovereign wealth funds is attracting close attention because:

- As this asset pool continues to expand in size and importance, so does its potential impact on various asset markets.
- Some countries, like the United States, which passed the Foreign Investment and National Security Act of 2007, worry that foreign investment by SWFs raises national security concerns because the purpose of the investment might be to secure control of strategically important industries for political rather than financial gain.
- Former U.S. Secretary of the Treasury Lawrence Summers has argued that the U.S. could potentially lose control of assets to wealthier foreign funds whose emergence "shake[s] [the] capitalist logic". These concerns have led the European Union (EU) to reconsider whether to allow its members to use "golden shares" to block certain foreign acquisitions. This strategy has largely been excluded as a viable option by the EU, for fear it would give rise to a resurgence in international protectionism. In the United States, these concerns are addressed by the Exon–Florio Amendment to the Omnibus Trade and Competitiveness Act of 1988, Pub. L. No. 100-418, § 5021, 102 Stat. 1107, 1426 (codified as amended at 50 U.S.C. app. § 2170 (2000)), as administered by the Committee on Foreign Investment in the United States (CFIUS).
- Their inadequate transparency is a concern for investors and regulators: for example, size and source of funds, investment goals, internal checks and balances, disclosure of relationships, and holdings in private equity funds.
- SWFs are not nearly as homogeneous as central banks or public pension funds.
- A lack of transparency and hence an increase in risk to the financial system, perhaps becoming the "new hedge funds".

The governments of SWFs commit to follow certain rules:

- Accumulation rule (what portion of revenue can be spent/saved)
- Withdraw rule (when the Government can withdraw from the fund)
- Investment (where revenue can be invested in foreign or domestic assets)

=== Recent governmental interest ===
- On 5 March 2008, a joint sub-committee of the U.S. House Financial Services Committee held a hearing to discuss the role of "Foreign Government Investment in the U.S. Economy and Financial Sector". The hearing was attended by representatives of the U.S. Department of Treasury, the U.S. Securities and Exchange Commission, the Federal Reserve Board, Norway's Ministry of Finance, Singapore's Temasek Holdings, and the Canada Pension Plan Investment Board.
- On 20 August 2008, Germany approved a law that requires parliamentary approval for foreign investments that endanger national interests. Specifically, it affects acquisitions of more than 25% of a German company's voting shares by non-European investors—but the economics minister Michael Glos has pledged that investment reviews would be "extremely rare". The legislation is loosely modeled on a similar one by the U.S. Committee on Foreign Investments. Sovereign wealth funds are also increasing their spending. In 2015, Qatar announced a $35 billion investment in United States assets over a period of five years.
- On 3 February 2025, President Donald Trump signed an executive order directing the creation of a United States sovereign wealth fund within the next year.
- On 23 February 2025, Indonesian President Prabowo Subianto announced a new sovereign wealth fund Daya Anagata Nusantara, also known as Danantara, which is expected to manage $900 billion in assets. The $20 billion first wave of investments were announced as targeting natural resource processing, artificial intelligence, and energy and food security.
- Sovereign wealth funds from Oman, Qatar, Saudi Arabia, Singapore, and the United Arab Emirates have acquired stakes in frontier AI companies including OpenAI, Anthropic, and xAI.
- On 27 April 2026, Prime Minister Mark Carney announced the creation of a Canadian sovereign wealth fund.
- CNBC reported in July 2026 that a survey performed the prior month had found 69% of Americans supporting a proposal requiring AI companies to transfer half their stock to a public sovereign wealth fund.

=== Santiago Principles ===
A number of transparency indices sprang up before the Santiago Principles, some more stringent than others. To address these concerns, some of the world's main SWFs came together in a summit in Santiago, Chile, on 2–3 September 2008. Under the leadership of the IMF, they formed a temporary International Working Group of Sovereign Wealth Funds. This working group then drafted the 24 Santiago Principles, to set out a common global set of international standards regarding transparency, independence, and accountability in the way that SWFs operate. These were published after being presented to the IMF International Monetary Financial Committee on 11 October 2008. They also considered a standing committee to represent them, and so a new organisation, the International Forum of Sovereign Wealth Funds was set up to maintain the new standards going forward and represent them in international policy debates.

As of 2016, 30 funds have formally signed up to the Principles, representing collectively 80% of the assets managed by sovereign funds globally or US$5.5 trillion.

Natural resource-rich developing economies are typically encouraged to adopt good governance standards for sovereign wealth funds, such as the Santiago Principles, which emphasize transparency, accountability, and sound investment practices. This approach is often preferred over local content policies, which can foster corruption and rent-seeking behavior in contexts with weak governance.

== Size ==
Assets under management of SWFs amounted to $13–15 trillion as of 2025.

As of 2020, SWFs funded by oil and gas exports held a combined total of $5.4 trillion. Non-commodity SWFs are generally financed through transfers from foreign exchange reserves, government budget surpluses, or privatization proceeds. Countries in the Middle East and Asia account for 77% of all SWFs.

== Depletion ==
Numerous SWFs have gone bankrupt throughout history. The most notable ones have been Algeria's FRR, Brazil's FSB, Ecuador's numerous SWF arrangements, Papua New Guinea's MRSF, and Venezuela's FIEM and FONDEN. The main reason why these funds have been exhausted is due to political instability, while economic determinants generally play a less important role.

SWFs in unstable countries may provoke risks for recipient states of SWF investments, given that the instability in SWF-sponsor countries makes those investments uncertain and likely to be disinvested to weather political risk in the short-term.

Highly stable countries, such as Denmark, Qatar, China, or Australia are less likely to experience SWF depletion precisely because of their political stability.

== Largest sovereign wealth funds ==
| Country or region | Abbrev. | Fund name | Assets (billions US$) | Inception | Origin |
|---|---|---|---|---|---|
| Norway | GPF-G | Government Pension Fund Global | 2,499 | 1990 | Oil & Gas |
| China | SAFE | SAFE Investment Company | 2,047 | 1997 | Non-commodity |
| China | CIC | China Investment Corporation | 1,567 | 2007 | Non-commodity |
| Singapore | GIC | GIC Private Limited | 1,181 | 1981 | Non-commodity |
| United Arab Emirates | ADIA | Abu Dhabi Investment Authority | 1,180 | 1976 | Oil & Gas |
| Kuwait | KIA | Kuwait Investment Authority | 1,072 | 1953 | Oil & Gas |
| Saudi Arabia | PIF | Public Investment Fund | 900 | 1971 | Oil & Gas |
| Indonesia | Danantara | Daya Anagata Nusantara Investment Management Agency | 900 | 2025 | Minerals / Non-commodity |
| Qatar | QIA | Qatar Investment Authority | 600 | 2005 | Oil & Gas |
| Hong Kong | HKMA | Exchange Fund | 569 | 1935 | Non-commodity |
| Singapore | TH | Temasek Holdings | 568 | 1974 | Non-commodity |
| China | NSSF | National Council for Social Security Fund | 503 | 2000 | Non-commodity |
| United Arab Emirates | ICD | Investment Corporation of Dubai | 457 | 2006 | Oil & Gas |
| Turkey | TWF | Turkey Wealth Fund | 442 | 2017 | Non-commodity |
| Singapore | CPF | Central Provident Fund | 436 | 1955 | Pension fund |
| United Arab Emirates | PJSC | Mubadala Investment Company | 385 | 2002 | Oil & Gas |
| United Arab Emirates | ADQ | Abu Dhabi Developmental Holding Company | 271 | 2018 | Non-commodity |
| South Korea | KIC | Korea Investment Corporation | 232 | 2005 | Non-commodity |
| Iran | NDFI | National Development Fund | 195 | 2011 | Oil & Gas |
| Australia | FF | Future Fund | 184 | 2006 | Non-commodity |
| Russia | NWF | Russian National Wealth Fund | 160 | 2008 | Oil & Gas |
| United Arab Emirates | EIA | Emirates Investment Authority | 116 | 2007 | Oil & Gas |
| Kazakhstan | SK | Samruk-Kazyna | 80.665 | 2008 | Oil & Gas |
| United Arab Emirates | DW | Dubai World | 80 | 2005 | Non-commodity |
| United States | APF | Alaska Permanent Fund | 80.463 | 1976 | Oil & Gas |
| Brunei | BIA | Brunei Investment Agency | 73 | 1983 | Oil & Gas |
| Libya | LIA | Libyan Investment Authority | 67 | 2006 | Oil & Gas |
| Oman | OIA | Oman Investment Fund | 60 | 2020 | Oil & Gas |
| United States | PSF | Texas Permanent School Fund | 57.291 | 1854 | Land & Mineral Royalties |
| Kazakhstan | NF | Kazakhstan National Fund | 55.7 | 2012 | Oil & Gas |
| Azerbaijan | SOFAZ | State Oil Fund of the Republic of Azerbaijan | 73.541 | 1999 | Oil & Gas |
| Ethiopia | EIH | Ethiopian Investment Holdings | 45 | 2021 | Non-commodity |
| Kazakhstan | Baiterek Holding | Baiterek National Investment Holding | 40 | 2013 | Non-commodity |
| Austria | ÖBAG | Österreichische Beteiligungs AG | 38.4 | 1967 | Non-commodity |
| United States | PUF | Texas Permanent University Fund | 36.469 | 1876 | Land & Mineral Royalties |
| Malaysia | KN | Khazanah Nasional | 36.1 | 1993 | Non-commodity |
| New Zealand | NZSF | New Zealand Superannuation Fund | 35.1 | 2003 | Non-commodity |
| France | BPI | Bpifrance | 33.5 | 2008 | Non-commodity |
| United States | LGPF | New Mexico Land Grant Permanent Fund | 32.093 | 1912 | Land & Mineral Royalties |
| Russia | RDIF | Russian Direct Investment Fund | 25 | 2011 | Non-commodity |
| Germany | NWDF | Nuclear Waste Disposal Fund | 25 | 2017 | Non-commodity |
| Norway | GPF-N | Government Pension Fund – Norway | 22 | 2006 | Oil & Gas |
| Papua New Guinea | PNGSWF | Papua New Guinea Sovereign Wealth Fund | 22 | 2011 | Oil & Gas |
| (Republic of Ireland) Ireland | ISIF | Ireland Strategic Investment Fund | 19 | 2014 | Non-commodity |
| Canada | AHSTF | Alberta Heritage Savings Trust Fund | 18.9 | 1976 | Oil & Gas |
| Bahrain | BMHC | Mumtalakat Holding Company | 18.3 | 2006 | Oil & Gas |
| (Timor-Leste) Timor Leste | TLPF | Timor-Leste Petroleum Fund | 17 | 2005 | Oil & Gas |
| (Republic of Ireland) Ireland | FIF | Future Ireland Fund | 14.7 | 2024 | Non-commodity |
| Japan | JIC | Japan Investment Corporation | 12.2 | 2018 | Non-commodity |
| Colombia | FAEP | Fondo de Ahorro y Estabilización Petrolera | 12 | 1995 | Oil & Gas |
| Greece | HCAP | Growthfund | 12 | 2016 | Non-commodity |
| Monaco | FH | Fundus Heritage | 1,2 | 1923 | Historical Real Estate |
| Chile | ESSF | Economic and Social Stabilization Fund | 11 | 2007 | Copper |
| Chile | PRF | Pension Reserve Fund | 11 | 2006 | Copper |
| United States | PWMTF | Permanent Wyoming Mineral Trust Fund | 11.130 | 1974 | Minerals |
| Philippines | MIF | Maharlika Investment Fund | 9.2 | 2023 | Non-commodity |
| United States | NDLF | North Dakota Legacy Fund | 10.879 | 2011 | Oil & Gas |
| United States | STPF | New Mexico Severance Tax Permanent Fund | 9.747 | 1973 | Oil & Gas |
| United Kingdom | NWF | National Wealth Fund | 57.5 | 2024 | Non-commodity |
| Indonesia | INA | Indonesia Investment Authority | 8.61 | 2021 | Non-commodity |
| Pakistan | PK | Pakistan Sovereign Wealth Fund | 8.06 | 2023 | Non-commodity |
| Mexico | FMP | Fondo Mexicano del Petroleo para la Estabilizacion y el Desarrollo | 7 | 2000 | Oil & Gas |
| (Trinidad and Tobago) Trinidad & Tobago | HSF | Heritage and Stabilization Fund | 5.6 | 2000 | Oil & Gas |
| India | NIIF | National Investment and Infrastructure Fund | 5.3 | 2015 | Non-commodity |
| China | CADF | China-Africa Development Fund | 5 | 2007 | Non-commodity |
| Peru | FSF | Fiscal Stabilization Fund | 5 | 1999 | Non-commodity |
| (Republic of Ireland) Ireland | ICNF | Infrastructure, Climate and Nature Fund | 4.8 | 2024 | Non-commodity |
| Italy | CDP Equity | Cassa Depositi e Prestiti Equity | 394 | 2011 | Non-commodity |
| Botswana | PF | Pula Fund | 4.1 | 1994 | Diamonds |
| United States | ATF | Alabama Trust Fund | 3.4 | 1985 | Oil & Gas |
| United States | IEFIB | Idaho Endowment Fund Investment Board | 3.2 | 1969 | Land & Mineral Royalties |
| United States | SIFTO | Utah School and Institutional Trust Funds Office | 2.5 | 1983 | Land & Mineral Royalties |
| Vietnam | SCIC | State Capital Investment Corporation | 2.4 | 2006 | Non-commodity |
| Nigeria | NSIA | Nigeria Sovereign Investment Authority | 2.3 | 2011 | Oil & Gas |
| Angola | FSDEA | Fundo Soberano de Angola | 2.2 | 2012 | Oil & Gas |
| Israel | CIF | Israeli Citizens' Fund | 2.08 | 2022 | Gas & Minerals |
| Belgium | SFPIM | Federale Participatie- en Investeringsmaatschappij | 2 | 1962 | Non-commodity |
| United Arab Emirates | RAKIA | Ras Al Khaimah Investment Authority | 2 | 2005 | Oil & Gas |
| United Arab Emirates | SAM | Sharjah Asset Management Holding | 2 | 2008 | Non-Commodity |
| United States | CSF | Oregon Common School Fund | 2 | 1859 | Lands & Mineral Royalties |
| Kuwait | AWQAF | Awqaf and Islamic Affairs Fund | 1.99 | 1993 | Non-commodity |
| Panama | FAP | Fondo de Ahorro de Panama | 3.6 | 2012 | Non-commodity |
| United States | LEQTF | Louisiana Education Quality Trust Fund | 1.5 | 1986 | Oil & Gas |
| United States | BCPL | Wisconsin Board of Commissioners of Public Lands | 1.4 | 1848 | Land, Timber and Non-commodity |
| United States | FMP | Colorado Public School Fund Endowment Board | 1.2 | 2016 | Lands and Minerals Royalties |
| Gabon | FGIS | Fonds Gabonais d'Investissements Strategiques | 1.0 | 2012 | Oil & Gas |
| Palestine | PIF | Palestine Investment Fund | 0.9 | 2003 | Non-commodity |
| Ghana | GPF | Ghana Petroleum Funds | 0.9 | 2011 | Oil & Gas |
| Australia | WAFF | Western Australian Future Fund | 0.9 | 2012 | Minerals |
| Turkmenistan | TSF | Turkmenistan Stabilization Fund | 0.5 | 2008 | Oil & Gas |
| Bolivia | FINPRO | Fondo para la Revolución Industrial Productiva | 0.4 | 2015 | Non-commodity |
| Kiribati | RERF | Revenue Equalization Reserve Fund | 1.5 | 1956 | Phosphates |
| Equatorial Guinea | FRGF | Fonds de Réserves pour Générations Futures | 0.2 | 2002 | Oil & Gas |
| Rwanda | AGDF | Agaciro Development Fund | 0.2 | 2012 | Non-commodity |
| United States | WVFF | West Virginia Future Fund | 0.1 | 2014 | Oil & Gas |
| Mauritania | NFHR | National Fund for Hydrocarbon Reserves | 0.1 | 2006 | Oil & Gas |
| Mongolia | FHF | Chinggis Fund, Future Heritage Fund | 0.1 | 2011 | Minerals |
| Nigeria | BDIC | Bayelsa Development and Investment Corporation | 0.1 | 2012 | Non-commodity |
| Senegal | FONSIS | Fonds Souverain d'Investissement Strategiques | 0.1 | 2012 | Non-commodity |

== See also ==
- Boutique investment bank
- Fund of funds
- Global financial system
- Investment management
- Lists of exchange-traded funds
- List of hedge funds
- List of investment banks
- List of private equity firms
- List of countries by total private wealth
- List of U.S. states by sovereign wealth funds
- Urban wealth fund or a Public wealth fund
