= Alaska Permanent Fund =

American oil and mining revenue fund

The Alaska Permanent Fund (APF) is a constitutionally established permanent fund and sovereign wealth fund managed by a state-owned corporation, the Alaska Permanent Fund Corporation (APFC). It was established in Alaska in 1976 by Article 9, Section 15 of the Alaska State Constitution under Governor Jay Hammond and Attorney General Avrum Gross. From February 1976 until April 1980, the Department of Revenue Treasury Division managed the state's Permanent Fund assets, until, in 1980, the Alaska State Legislature created the APFC.

As of 2019, the fund was worth approximately $64 billion that has been funded by oil and mining revenues and has paid out an average of approximately $1,600 annually per resident (adjusted to 2019 dollars). The main use for the fund's revenue has been to pay out the Permanent Fund Dividend (PFD), which many authors portray as the only example of a basic income in practice.

== History ==
Shortly after the oil from Alaska's North Slope began flowing to market through the Trans-Alaska Pipeline System, the Permanent Fund was created by an amendment to the Alaska Constitution. It was designed to be an investment where at least 25% of the oil money would be put into a dedicated fund for future generations, who would no longer have oil as a resource. This does not mean the fund is solely funded by oil revenue. The Fund includes neither property taxes on oil company property nor income tax from oil corporations, so the minimum 25% deposit is closer to 11% if those sources were also considered. The Alaska Permanent Fund sets aside a certain share of oil revenues to continue benefiting current and future generations of Alaskans. Some believed that the legislature too quickly and too inefficiently spent the $900 million bonus the state got in 1969 after leasing out the oil fields. This belief spurred a desire to put some oil revenues out of direct political control.

The Alaska Permanent Fund Corporation manages the assets of both the Permanent Fund and other state investments, but spending Fund income is up to the Legislature. The corporation is to manage for maximum prudent return, and not—as some Alaskans at first wanted—as a development bank for in-state projects. The Fund grew from an initial investment of $734,000 in 1977 to approximately $53.7 billion as of July 9, 2015. Some growth was due to good management, some to inflationary re-investment, and some via legislative decisions to deposit extra income during boom years. Each year, the fund's realized earnings are split between inflation-proofing, operating expenses, and the annual Permanent Fund Dividend.

The fund is a member of the International Forum of Sovereign Wealth Funds and has therefore signed up to the Santiago Principles on best practice in managing sovereign wealth funds. The Fund's current chief investment officer is Marcus Frampton.

In July 2015, executive director Michael J. Burns died having led the corporation since 2004.

== Alaska Permanent Fund Corporation ==
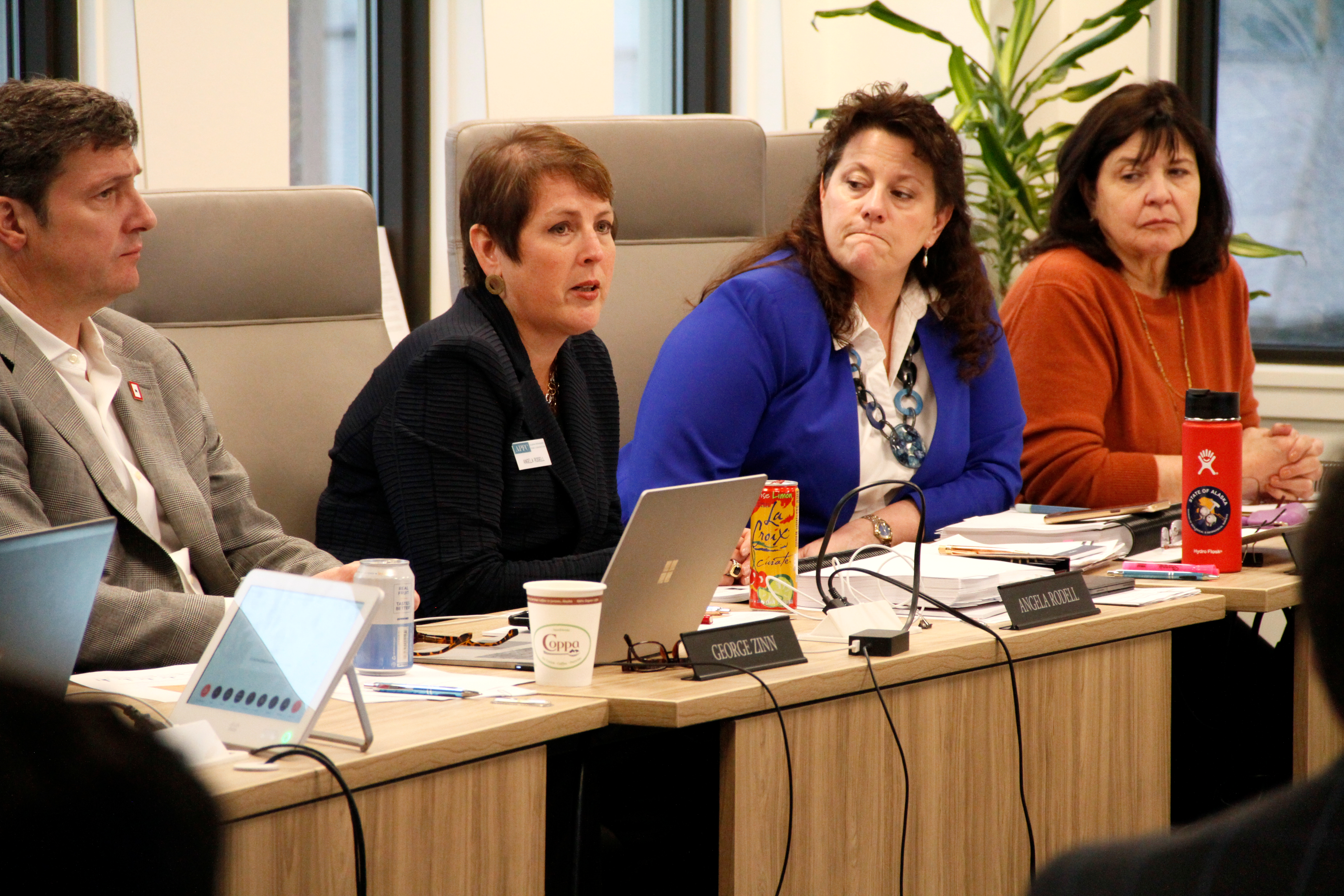
APFC board meeting in February 2020. Then-CEO Angela Rodell addresses the board.

The Alaska Permanent Fund Corporation is a government instrument of the State of Alaska created to manage and invest the assets of the Alaska Permanent Fund and other funds designated by law.

=== Board of trustees ===
The Board of Trustees are governor-appointed

- Jason Brune, chair, appointed in 2022 by Gov. Dunleavy
- Adam Crum, Vice-chair, appointed 2022 by Gov. Dunleavy
- Ryan Anderson, appointed 2023 by Gov. Dunleavy
- Craig Richards, appointed 2021 by Gov. Dunleavy
- Ethan Schutt, appointed 2020 by Gov. Dunleavy
- John Binkley, appointed 2025 by Gov Dunleavy

== Permanent Fund Dividend ==
The Permanent Fund Dividend (PFD) is a dividend paid to Alaska residents that have lived within the state for a full calendar year (January 1 – December 31), and intend to remain an Alaska resident indefinitely. This means if residency is taken on January 2, the "calendar year" would not start until next January 1.

However, an individual is not eligible for a PFD for a dividend year if:

(1) the individual was absent from Alaska for more than 180 days, unless it was on an allowable absence;
(2) during the qualifying year, the individual was sentenced as a result of conviction in this state of a felony;
(3) during all or part of the qualifying year, the individual was incarcerated as a result of the conviction in this state of a

(A) felony; or
(B) misdemeanor if the individual has been convicted of

(i) a prior felony as defined in AS 11.81.900; or
(ii) two or more prior misdemeanors as defined in AS 11.81.900

The amount of each payment is based upon a five-year average of the Permanent Fund's performance and varies widely depending on the stock market and many other factors. The PFD is calculated by the following steps:

1. Add fund statutory net income from the current plus the previous four fiscal years.
2. Multiply by 21%
3. Divide by 2
4. Subtract prior year obligations, expenses and PFD program operations
5. Divide by the number of eligible applicants

The lowest individual dividend payout was $331.29 in 1984 and the highest was $3,284 in 2022. In 2008, Governor Sarah Palin signed Senate Bill 4002 that used revenues generated from the state's natural resources and provided a one-time special payment of $1,200 to every Alaskan eligible for the PFD.

Although the principal or corpus of the fund is constitutionally protected, income earned by the fund, like nearly all state income, is constitutionally defined as general fund money.

The first dividend plan would have paid Alaskans $50 for each year of residency up to 20 years, but the U.S. Supreme Court in Zobel v. Williams, 457 U.S. 55 (1982) disapproved the $50 per year formula as an invidious distinction burdening interstate travel. As a result, each qualified resident now receives the same annual amount, regardless of age or years of residency.

Payments from the fund are subject to federal income tax. Alaska has no state income tax, but part-year residents who leave the state may be taxed on them by their new state of residence.

The PFD is a Basic Income in the form of a resource dividend. Some researchers argue, "It has helped Alaska attain the highest economic equality of any state in the United States... And, seemingly unnoticed, it has provided unconditional cash assistance to needy Alaskans at a time when most states have scaled back aid and increased conditionality."

=== Annual individual payout ===
This is the fund's history of annual individual payouts, in USD.

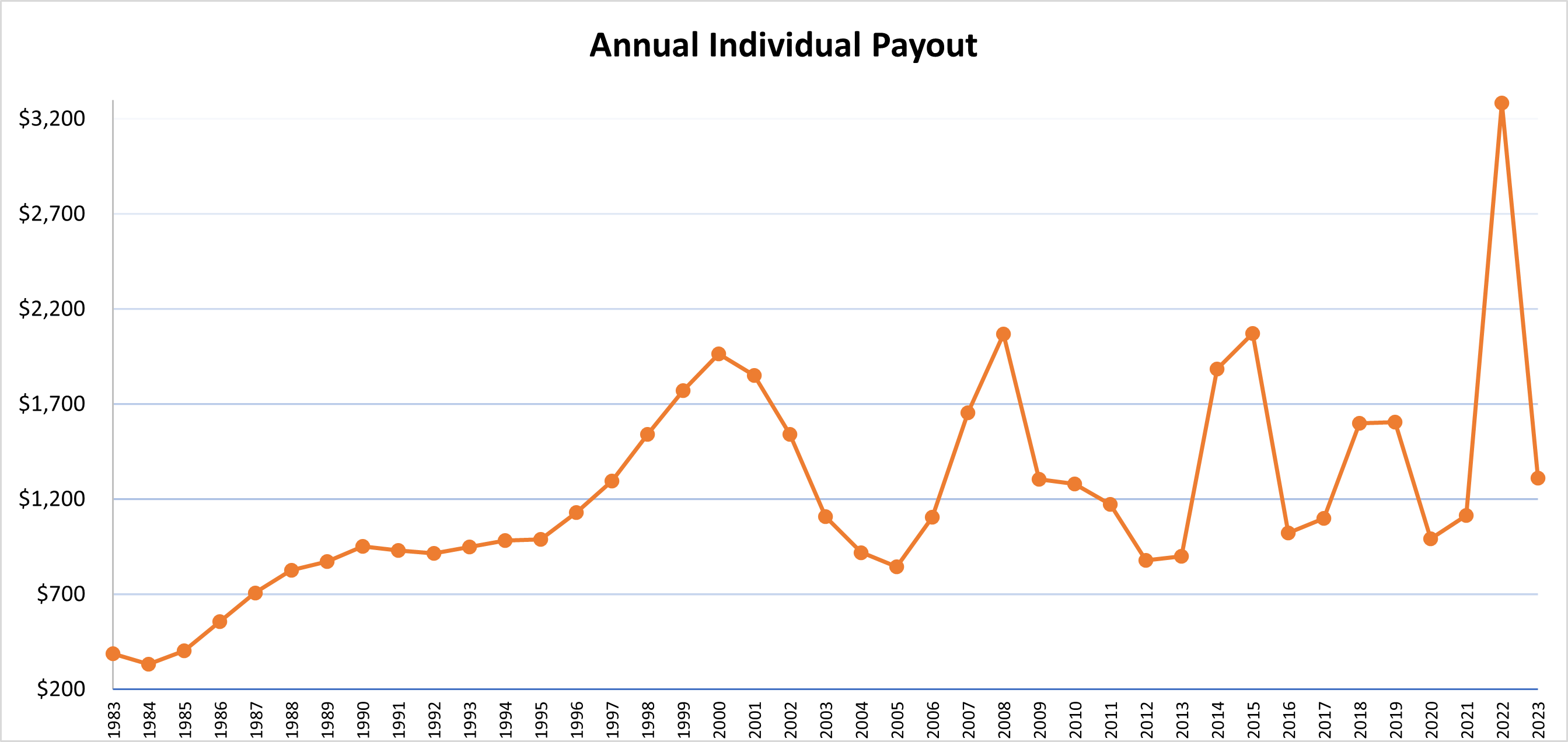
History of annual individual payouts, 1983–2023 in nominal USD

Year	Dividend amount (USD)	Inflation-adjusted dividend amount (2025 USD)	Notes
1982	1,000.00	3,336.21	
1983	386.15	1,248.25	
1984	331.29	1,026.66	
1985	404.00	1,209.37	
1986	556.26	1,633.82	
1987	708.19	2,006.95	
1988	826.93	2,251.14	
1989	873.16	2,267.87	
1990	952.63	2,347.600	
1991	931.34	2,201.49	
1992	915.84	2,101.200	
1993	949.46	2,116.11	
1994	983.90	2,137.23	
1995	990.30	2,092.41	
1996	1,130.68	2,321.100	
1997	1,296.54	2,600.34	
1998	1,540.88	3,043.69	
1999	1,769.84	3,420.54	
2000	1,963.86	3,671.56	
2001	1,850.28	3,364.300	
2002	1,540.76	2,757.97	
2003	1,107.56	1,938.43	
2004	919.84	1,567.91	
2005	845.76	1,394.23	
2006	1,106.96	1,767.88	
2007	1,654.00	2,568.200	
2008	2,069.00	3,093.91	Dividend came with a $1,200 Alaska Resource Rebate
2009	1,305.00	1,958.41	
2010	1,281.00	1,891.300	
2011	1,174.00	1,680.24	
2012	878.00	1,231.29	
2013	900.00	1,243.93	
2014	1,884.00	2,562.23	
2015	2,072.00	2,814.35	
2016	1,022.00	1,371.03	Dividend was estimated to be $2,052 (2,752.79) but Governor Bill Walker's veto reduced it
2017	1,100.00	1,444.81	Dividend was estimated to be over $2,300 (3,020.97) however it was reduced by legislative action
2018	1,600.00	2,051.42	Dividend was estimated to be $2,700 (3,461.77) however it was reduced by legislative action
2019	1,606.00	2,022.39	
2020	992.00	1,234.10	
2021	1,114.00	1,323.58	
2022	3,284.00	3,613.00	$662 energy relief portion of dividend was deemed non-taxable
2023	1,312.00		
2024	1,702.00		
2025	1,000.00		
2026	TBD		

== Constitutional Budget Reserve ==
The Constitutional Budget Reserve (CBR) is a companion fund to the Permanent Fund which was established in 1991 to ease problems from the variability of oil revenue, which vary depending upon the price of oil in the market. Deposits into the CBR consist of settlements of back taxes and other revenues owed to the state. Draws from the CBR into the general fund require a 3/4 vote of each house of the legislature and must be repaid. To date, the general fund has amassed a debt of approximately $4 billion to the CBR to maintain a stable level of public spending.

The size of the debt owed to the CBR has raised doubts over repayment. The CBR is based on the assumption that the general fund deficit will remain constant over time (allowing paybacks to balance draws). Believing this to be mistaken, critics allege the state uses resources from the CBR to avoid reducing the budget, acknowledging debt, or increasing taxes. According to them, falling oil revenues and growing spending requirements will leave paybacks consistently lower than draws, causing the CBR to fail.

Former state senator Dave Donley (R-Anchorage) recognized that the high vote requirement to spend CBR money (¾ of each house) had a perverse and unintended consequence. The high vote requirement was meant to ensure that draws from the CBR would be rare, but in fact such draws are common. Donley explained that the high vote requirement really empowers the minority party (in the 2000–2007 era, the Democratic Party), who can then get what they want in a Christmas tree bill (presents for everyone, both majority and minority) in exchange for their votes (which minority votes would not be needed with the usual 51% voting rule). Donley thus explains why both parties can and do use the higher voting rule requirement to more frequently spend from the CBR.

== Issues with the Permanent Fund ==
=== Dividends and spending ===
While the Permanent Fund generally generated large surpluses even after payment of the Dividend [PFD], the state general fund operated at a substantial deficit. However, the consolidated account of both General and Permanent Funds usually shows a surplus. The Funds' ultimate uses were never clearly spelled out at its inception, leaving no current consensus over what role Fund earning should play in the current and expected state budget shortfalls. However, some people argue that the original intent was to fund state government after the temporary oil riches ceased, while others note that the Fund's intent changed from its 1976 origin when in 1982 the Dividend program began. Public opinion strongly favors the Dividend program. Indeed, in 1999, with oil prices going as low as $9 per barrel and Alaska's oil consultant Daniel Yergin forecasting low prices "for the foreseeable future", the State put an advisory vote before Alaskans, asking if government could spend "some" part of Permanent Fund earning for government purposes. Gov. Knowles, Lt. Gov. Ulmer, and many other elected officials urged a "yes" vote. Campaign spending greatly favored the "yes" side. Despite this, the public voted "no" by nearly 84%. (Oil prices rose dramatically, starting about two weeks after Yergin's prediction, to above $60 per barrel, though the quantity produced continues to fall.) Perceived support of the dividend program is so universally strong that it ensures the dividend's continuity and the protection of the Fund's principal, since any measure characterized as negatively impacting dividend payouts represents a loss to the entire populace. That is, legislators willing to appropriate the Fund's annual earnings are constrained by the high political costs of any measures leading to a decrease in the public's dividend.

=== Percent of Market Value (POMV) proposal ===
In 2000, the APFC Board of Trustees proposed changing the Permanent Fund's management system to a Percent of Market Value (PoMV) approach which would require an amendment to the state constitution. The PoMV proposal would limit withdrawals to five percent of the fund's value each year, to be spent at the discretion of the Legislature. Currently the Legislature has authority to appropriate all of the fund's realized earnings. Tentative, unapproved proposals indicate that half of this five percent withdrawal would go to the dividend and half to government spending—but POMV died in the Legislature because most there saw POMV as unambiguously tied to such politically unpopular spending proposals. Most Alaskans (84% in 1999) disapprove of allowing the government to tamper with the fund, especially if that means government might spend Fund income.

Again in 2015–2017, a POMV approach was considered. The market price for North Slope oil fell from an average $107.57 per barrel in FY2014 to $50.05 per barrel in FY2017. This price shift caused an 80 percent decline in state revenue and resulted in a multibillion-dollar budget gap. Both bodies of the legislature have passed a bill that provides for an annual draw of 5.25% of the average balance of the Permanent Fund (average of the first 5 of the last six years). Since the formula is based on an average, rather than a single year, the effective draw is only about 4.2%—enough to preserve the real value of the fund considering that the fund has returned close to 9% annually. The legislature carefully vetted this percentage over the course of two sessions and has come to a consensus. This draw is projected to produce $2.7 billion in FY2019 and grow with the balance of the Permanent Fund. The major point of disagreement, however, is the size of the dividend: The House of Representatives version of the bill uses 5.25% draw for government (33% for Dividends and 67% for government services) and an additional 0.25% draw for Permanent Fund inflation proofing. This produces $2.7 billion ($1.8 billion for government use, net of a $900.9 million dividend—about $1,250.00 per Alaskan—growing with the value of the fund). The Senate version of the bill uses the same 5.25% draw as the House, but directs only 25% of the draw to dividends. This produces the same $2.7 billion but government services receive $2.0 billion while the dividend receives just under $700 million—about $1,000.00 per person—growing with the value of the fund.

Oil revenues are forecast (by the state Department of Revenue) to remain stagnant through FY2027, and traditional budget reserves may be empty by FY2019 but with a Permanent Fund value in excess of $60.0 billion, the budget gap can be reduced significantly. Since this POMV proposal does not close the gap entirely, members of the legislature are considering a tax bill as well.

=== Wielechowski Lawsuit ===
In 2016, Alaska State Senator Bill Wielechowski, alongside former senators Rick Halford and Clem Tillion, filed a lawsuit against the State of Alaska, challenging Governor Bill Walker's veto that reduced the Permanent Fund Dividend (PFD) payments. The plaintiffs argued that the governor's veto violated existing statutes governing the PFD, which mandated automatic transfers from the Permanent Fund's earnings reserve to the dividend fund without requiring legislative appropriation. However, the Alaska Supreme Court upheld the governor's veto, ruling that the transfer of funds for dividend payments required legislative appropriation and was subject to the governor's veto power.

This lawsuit effectively placed the PFD in direct competition with other state budgetary items, as its funding became contingent upon annual legislative appropriations rather than automatic transfers.

== Impact ==
A 2018 paper found that the Alaska Permanent Fund "dividend had no effect on employment, and increased part-time work by 1.8 percentage points (17 percent)... our results suggest that a universal and permanent cash transfer does not significantly decrease aggregate employment."

A 2019 study found "a 14% increase in substance-abuse incidents the day after the [Alaska Permanent Fund] payment and a 10% increase over the following four weeks. This is partially offset by a 8% decrease in property crime, with no changes in violent crimes. On an annual basis, however, changes in criminal activity from the payment are small. Estimated costs comprise a very small portion of the total payment, suggesting that crime-related concerns of a universal cash transfer program may be unwarranted."

A 2024 paper in Poverty & Public Policy found that the Alaska Permanent Fund "reduced the number of Alaskans with incomes below the US poverty threshold by 20%–40%" and "reduced poverty rates of rural Indigenous Alaskans from 28% to less than 22%".

== See also ==
- Asset-based egalitarianism
- Universal basic income
- Citizen's dividend
- Government Pension Fund of Norway
- North Dakota Legacy Fund
- Permanent University Fund – funds universities in Texas from oil revenue
- Sovereign wealth fund
- Alaska v. Amerada Hess
- Georgism
