= Fondo Mexicano del Petroleo para la Estabilizacion y el Desarrollo =

Sovereign wealth fund of Mexico

The Fondo Mexicano del Petróleo para la Estabilización y el Desarrollo (lit. 'Mexican Petroleum Fund for Stabilization and Development', FoMePE) is a state-owned sovereign wealth fund of Mexico's government created to manage the wealth from revenue stream on its oil industry. The inception of the fund was designed by the Ministry of Finance and Public Credit (Secretaría de Hacienda y Crédito Público, SCHP) while Banco de Mexico manages the fund. The fund begun existence on 30 September 2014 but actual operation of the fund started on 1 January 2015 to become the newest addition in global sovereign wealth fund. The establishment of the fund forms part of the energy reform in Mexico following the declining production of oil that has affected the budget of the national government. The fund is a member of the International Forum of Sovereign Wealth Funds and are signed up to the 24 Santiago Principles which are a voluntary standard of best practice endorsed by the members for the management of the Sovereign Wealth Funds.

The FoMoPe serves two main objectives; to serve as a means of receiving and making payments on assignment of contracts for exploration and production of hydrocarbons; and to manage the Mexican state revenue from oil and other hydrocarbons.

== Management ==
The FoMoPe is managed by a technical committee composed of representatives from the executive branch and four independent members, all appointed by the Federal Executive with the approval of two thirds of members of the Senate. Government representatives include the secretaries of finance and energy, treasury and the governor of the central bank. The secretary of finance acts as the chairman of the governing body.

The Ministry of Finance and Public Credit acts as the grantor of the fund while Banco de Mexico serves as trustee.

== Current Management Board ==
The present management board include the Secretary of Treasury, Luis Videgaray Caso and the Secretary of Energy, Pedro Joaquin Coldwell, as well as the governor of the Bank of Mexico, Agustin Carstens.

In addition, four independent members appointed by the Executive and approved by the Senate include Arturo Manuel Fernández Pérez, Rafael Rangel Sostmann, Federico Reyes Heroles and Luis Manuel Enrique Tellez Kuenzler.
