= Israeli Citizens' Fund =

Proposed sovereign wealth fund of Israel

- Company type: Sovereign wealth fund
- Founded: 2022
- Headquarters: Tel Aviv, Israel
- Key people: Bezalel Smotrich (Chairman)
- AUM: US$ $2,080,000,000 (2024)
- Website: gov.il

The Israeli Citizens' Fund (Hebrew: קרן לאזרחי ישראל, Keren LeEzraḥei Yisra'el) is a sovereign wealth fund in Israel. It was established to handle projected future windfall profits expected from the discovery of the Tamar and Leviathan gas fields. The fund will be managed by the Bank of Israel.

Without the fund, the economy of Israel could in the future run the risk of so-called "Dutch disease". This happens when a significant increase in revenue from one sector (such as natural gas) causes the local currency (the shekel) to strengthen, which in turn would make other sectors of the economy less competitive.

In November 2010 the International Monetary Fund recommended, in its Article IV Consultation, that Israel set up a sovereign wealth fund. The OECD recommended likewise in 2011. The OECD estimates that its size by 2040 would be between 40 and US$175 billion (that is, between 10 and 50 percent of Israel's GDP), depending on the rate of new discoveries.

The law establishing the fund was passed by Knesset in July 2014. The law states that the fund will begin operating a month after the state's tax revenues from natural gas exceeds one billion. Originally expected to happen by 2017, more recent estimates expect this threshold to be passed by 2020. The complicated nature of the windfall tax might cause companies to use intricate forms of tax avoidance.

In January 2022, Finance Minister Avigdor Lieberman announced that the fund is expected to begin operating at the start of the fourth quarter of the year, when taxes on profits from natural gas and other resources reach a minimum level. By 1 June 2022 the fund had officially launched as the levies collected breached the 1 billion shekel threshold. By the end of 2022 the fund had $617 million in assets under management.

As of December 2024, the fund has US$1.47 billion in assets under management and US$1.83 billion of total levies collected.
