= Pakistan Sovereign Wealth Fund =

Sovereign wealth fund of Pakistan

- Company type: Sovereign wealth fund
- Industry: Institutional investor
- Founded: 2023; 3 years ago
- Headquarters: Islamabad, Pakistan
- Services: Investments
- Subsidiaries: Oil & Gas Development Company; Pakistan Petroleum; Mari Energies; National Bank of Pakistan; Pakistan Development Fund; Government Power Holding Ltd; Neelum-Jhelum Hydropower Company

Pakistan Sovereign Wealth Fund (PSWF) is the sovereign wealth fund of Pakistan that was established by the Pakistani government through the Pakistan Sovereign Wealth Fund Act 2023. The fund manages the assets of profitable state-owned enterprises like Oil and Gas Development Company Limited (OGDCL), Pakistan Petroleum Limited (PPL), and the National Bank of Pakistan (NBP).

The aim of the fund was to contribute to sustainable economic development in Pakistan by increasing local investment as well as attract investment from the Gulf Cooperation Council and Gulf countries. There has been criticism of the proposed fund, with the International Monetary Fund (IMF) asking that it be closed down due to the risk that the government lose control of the seven profitable state-owned companies transferred to the fund.

== History ==
On 31 July 2023, the National Assembly of Pakistan approved legislation to establish Pakistan Sovereign Wealth Fund. On 2 August, the Senate of Pakistan passed a law allowing the establishment of a state-owned fund. The fund aims to boost the country’s economic stability and growth. The fund is intended to manage the assets of profitable state-owned enterprises Oil and Gas Development Company (OGDCL), Pakistan Petroleum (PPL), Mari Energies, Government Power Holding, the Pakistan Development Fund, the Neelum-Jhelum Hydropower Company and the National Bank of Pakistan (NBP).

In August 2023, the Government of Pakistan transferred its entire shareholding in seven companies worth 2.3 trillion Pakistani rupee to a US $8.06 billion sovereign wealth fund.

In October 2024, Ahsan Iqbal, the Minister for Planning, Development and Special Initiatives, convened a meeting with a delegation from consulting company Alvarez and Marsal for the establishment of Pakistan Sovereign Wealth Fund.

== Legal issues ==
The government has faced pressure and criticism as the objectives and operational status seem unknown. In July 2024, the IMF demanded abolition of the fund in return for further assistance. The IMF said that the Pakistani government may lose control over the strategic companies transferred to the fund. The IMF urged the government to strengthen its privatisation law instead of selling these strategic assets in a non-transparent manner. The World Bank also urged for the abolition of the fund.
