= Korea Investment Corporation =

Korean government finance company

- Native name: 한국투자공사 韓國投資公社
- Type: Sovereign wealth fund
- Founded: 1 July 2005; 21 years ago
- Headquarters: Seoul, Republic of Korea
- Area served: Worldwide
- Key people: Il Young Park (Chief Executive Officer and President); Hoseok Jung (Chief Risk Officer); Hoon Lee (Chief Investment Officer); Sangmin Lee (Chief Operating Officer)
- AUM: US$232 billion (2026)
- Number of employees: 341 (2024)
- Parent: Ministry of Finance and Economy
- Website: www.kic.kr

The Korea Investment Corporation (KIC; Korean: 한국투자공사; Hanja: 韓國投資公社; RR: Hanguktujagongsa) is a sovereign wealth fund established by the government of South Korea in 2005. Its mission is to preserve and enhance the long-term purchasing power of South Korea's sovereign wealth (foreign reserves) through efficient management of public funds in the international financial markets. KIC manages assets entrusted by the Government, the Bank of Korea, and other public funds as defined under the National Finance Act. KIC directly invests the entrusted assets or re-entrusts the assets to external managers. As of 2026, KIC had $232 billion assets under management.

== Governance ==
Steering Committee

The Steering Committee deliberates and resolves the following matters (Article 9 of the KIC Act), including: mid- and long-term investment policies; modification of financial status, such as the increase or decrease of capital; entrustment of assets to KIC; appointment and dismissal of executive officers; approval of budget and account settlement; evaluation of management performance of KIC; inspection of the business. The Investment Sub-Committee and Risk Management Sub-Committee support the matters related to mid- and long-term investment policies of the Steering Committee. Furthermore, the Budget Deliberation Sub-Committee and the Evaluation & Compensation Sub-Committee deliberate on issues pertaining to the operation of KIC and performance evaluation.

Committee members include six professionals from the private sector and the three official members who are the representatives of institutions that have entrusted assets exceeding a set amount, namely the Minister of Economy and Finance, the Governor of the Bank of Korea and the CEO of KIC. The six private sector members, who are nominated by the Civil Member Candidate Nomination Committee and appointed by the President of the Republic of Korea, serve two-year terms. The chairman of the Steering Committee is elected from among the civil members.

Board of Directors

KIC maintains a board of directors which includes CEO and directors. The Board resolves important issues to be referred to the Steering Committee; use of emergency funds and carrying forward of the budget; matters pertaining to the adoption, amendment to and repeal of internal regulations of KIC; and any other matters of the Board deems necessary.

Chief Executive Officer(CEO)

CEO of KIC is appointed by the President of the Republic of Korea upon recommendation by the Minister of Economy and Finance through the President Recommendation Committee, and deliberation by the Steering Committee. The CEO represents KIC and presides over its business, and convenes the meetings of the board of directors and serves as the chairman of such meetings.

Statutory Auditor

In accordance with the Korea Investment Corporation Act, KIC has an independent audit function separate from the management. The full-time Statutory Auditor is appointed by the Minister of Economy and Finance through deliberation by the Steering Committee. Its role and responsibilities are to audit business and accounting activities at KIC.

Directors

Directors are appointed and dismissed by the CEO following deliberation by the Steering Committee. Appointed directors serve three-year terms.

== Investment ==
In January 2008, KIC invested $2 billion in Merrill Lynch as part of a $6.6 billion capital raising. The shared were converted to a stake in Bank of America following the bank's acquisition of Merrill Lynch in September 2008. In 2011, KIC purchased additional shares in the bank for $178 million. By December 2017 KIC had sold the stake.

From 2010, when KIC's real estate investment section was created, to 2016, it has generated 7.48% of annual returns. KIC had about 1.8% of its assets in real estate by the end of 2014.

In 2011, KIC opened an office on the tenth floor of 1 Bartholomew Lane in London. In October 2012, the fund purchased the 80,000 square feet block for £75 million. In January 2019, KIC sold the building for £107 million.

In October 2015, KIC was part of a consortium that acquired the InterContinental Hong Kong hotel for $938 million.

In January 2016, KIC contributed to a $1.41 billion takeover of a project from real estate firm Savills by New York-based global investment firm Brookfield Asset Management. KIC's investment gave them an 18% stake in the project. The project consisted of a shopping center, a hotel, a cinema as well as five residential buildings and seven office buildings, located at the Potsdamer Platz in Germany.

In 2016, KIC acquired a 49% stake in the Ritz-Carlton hotel in New York from Westbrook Partners, who holds the remaining 51%. That year KIC invested a total of $330 million into the purchase of hotels, including the Four Seasons' Hotel in San Francisco.

KIC joined the Korean National Pension Service in January 2017 to invest €350 million into a buyout fund raised by BC Partners. KIC's contribution was €150 million.

In 2019, KIC acquired three logistic centers from Amazon for €400 million. The centers, totaling more than 5 million square feet, are located in Paris, London and Barcelona.

KIC made a direct investment into Golub Capital in December 2022, acquiring a minority stake of less than 5%.

In February 2025, KIC together with Ontario Teachers' Pension Plan and Gateway Capital acquired Connect Central Sydney for $330 million from the New York-based global investment firm Brookfield.

I March 2026, KIC committed $150 million to a biotech research and development platform to facilitate Korean biotech companies' overseas expansion.

Asset Allocation (2023)

Portfolio	(%)
Traditional Assets	78.0
Alternative Assets	22.0

== Milestones ==
- Year 2005

March: Promulgation of Korea Investment Corporation Act July: Establishment of Korea Investment Corporation

- Year 2006

June: Signing of investment management agreement with the Bank of Korea
October: Signing of investment management agreement with the Ministry of Strategy and Finance

- Year 2007

April: Launch of global equity investment August: Launch of In-house global fixed income investment

- Year 2008

March: Launch of In-house global equity investment

- Year 2009

March: Expansion of Risk Management team
August: Launch of alternative investment team

- Year 2010

March: Formation of Special Investment Team
July: Opening of New York Office

- Year 2011

December: Opening of London Office
December: Adoption of the Long-term growth strategy 'Vision 2020'

- Year 2012

September 2012: Exceeding USD 50 billion in AUM

- Year 2014

March 2012: Launching the Public Community for Overseas Investment

- Year 2016

June 2014: Exceeding USD 100 billion in AUM

- Year 2017

September: Opening of Singapore Office

- Year 2018

December: Establishment of Stewardship Principles

- Year 2019

October: Exceeding USD 150 billion in AUM

- Year 2021

March: Opening of San Francisco office

- Year 2022

April: Exceeding USD 200 billion in AUM

- Year 2022

Dec: Joining the UN-supported Principles for Responsible Investment (PRI)

== See also ==
- The Ministry of Economy and Finance
- The Bank of Korea
