= Timor-Leste Petroleum Fund =

Sovereign wealth fund of East Timor

The Timor-Leste Petroleum Fund (Portuguese: Fundo petrolífero de Timor-Leste) is a sovereign wealth fund into which the surplus wealth produced by East Timor petroleum and gas income is deposited by the East Timorese government.

The Fund was established in 2005 with an opening balance of $205 million. By 31 December 2010, the capital of the fund had grown to US$6.9 billion. By December 2021 the fund had US$18.5 billion in assets under management.

The Fund has signed up to the Santiago Principles on best practices for managing Sovereign Wealth Funds, and has joined the International Forum of Sovereign Wealth Funds. The Fund thus now regularly publishes how it adopts and implements the principles espoused by these associations, including how it incorporates them in its governance procedures.

In 2019, the Petroleum Fund of Timor-Leste was ranked seventh out of 64 sovereign wealth funds worldwide, with a score of 91 out of 100, in the Sovereign Wealth Fund Transparency and Accountability Scoreboard published by the Peterson Institute for International Economics.

== Finances ==
Earnings of the fund were around 4% in the 5 years to July 2011. A key milestone was achieved in June 2014 when the equity allocation in the fund reached 40%. The Petroleum Fund returned 3.3% in 2014, or 2.5% after inflation. The fund's end-of-year balance in 2014 was $16.5 billion.

| Year | Balance in mil. USD-$ | Revenues in mil. USD-$ | Investment Returns in mil. USD-$ | Withdrawals in mil. USD-$ |
|---|---|---|---|---|
| 2018 | 15,804 | 447 | –460 | 983 |
| 2020 | 18,905 | 326.1 | 1,773 | 886.3 |
