= National Investment and Infrastructure Fund =

Sovereign wealth fund of India dedicated to infrastructure

National Investment and Infrastructure Fund Limited
- Type: Public Sector Company
- Industry: Institutional Investor, Fund Management
- Founded: February 2015; 11 years ago
- Headquarters: Mumbai, India
- Area served: India
- Key people: Sanjiv Aggarwal, CEO & MD
- Total assets: ₹ 39,000 crore (US$4.9 billion)
- Website: niifindia.in

National Investment and Infrastructure Fund Limited (NIIFL) is an Indian public sector company which maintains infrastructure investments funds for international and Indian investors anchored by the Government of India. The objective behind creating this organisation was to catalyse capital into the country and support its growth needs across sectors of importance.

In Union Budget 2015-16, India's then-Finance Minister, Arun Jaitley announced the creation of NIIFL. It was proposed to be established as an Alternative Investment Fund with an inflow of ₹20,000 crore from the Government of India, with their commitment being 49% of the total corpus. NIIFL was approved in August 2015 by the Department of Economic Affairs. First meeting of its governing council was held in December 2015 further to which it was registered with SEBI as Category II Alternative Investment Fund. In June 2016, Finance Ministry announced that they appointed Sujoy Bose as the first Chief Executive Office of NIIFL who was then the Director and Global Co-Head, Infrastructure and Natural Resources International Finance Corporation (IFC). In February 2024, Sanjiv Aggarwal was appointed as chief executive officer & Managing Director of NIIFL. Aggarwal previously worked with London-based Actis, where he became a partner in 2010. At Actis, Aggarwal was responsible for the company's energy investments in Asia including India.

As of April 2024, NIIFL has over US$4.9 billion in assets under management.

== History ==
The Government of India founded the National Investment and Infrastructure Fund Limited (NIIFL) in February 2015 as a sovereign-anchored fund. Its creation was announced in the Union Budget of 2015-16 by the then Finance Minister Arun Jaitley. In October 2016, Sujoy Bose was appointed as the managing director and CEO of NIIF. In May 2023, Rajiv Dhar, executive director and Chief Operating Officer was named as the chief executive officer & Managing Director of NIIFL on an interim basis. His interim appointment followed Sujoy Bose's request to relieve him from his responsibilities as managing director and chief executive officer, a position he held since 2016 in the company. In February 2024, Sanjiv Aggarwal was appointed as chief executive officer & Managing Director of NIIFL. In December 2020, NIIFL achieved the final close of its infrastructure Fund, NIIF Master Fund USD 2.34 billion.

== Leadership ==
The Governing Council of the National Investment and Infrastructure Fund (NIIF) is chaired by the Hon’ble Finance Minister of India and has members from corporate bodies, investments and policy sectors. The Governing Council meets once a year and provides suggestions of the overall strategic decisions of the NIIFL. The Governing Council is currently chaired by Hon’ble Finance Minister of India Nirmala Sitharaman, Finance Minister of India. Among the other council members are Debasish Panda (Secretary of Financial Services), Ajay Seth (Secretary, Department of Economic Affairs), Dinesh Khara (chairman, State Bank of India), Hemendra Kothari (chairman, DSP Group), T. V. Mohandas Pai (chairman, Manipal Global Education).

NIIFL's Board of Directors establishes and reviews the business strategy that guides the business affairs of the organization. It is composed of shareholder representatives and/or nominees and independent directors. Sanjiv Aggarwal is the Managing Director and CEO of the organization. In April 2024, Rajiv Dhar was named as the first Chief Investment Officer of NIIFL. Dhar has been associated with NIIF since 2017. He initially joined as executive director and Chief Operating Officer before stepping in as CEO & MD of NIIF on an interim basis in May 2023. Erstwhile Managing Director – India of Temasek, Padmanabh Sinha is the executive director and CIO – Growth Equity, managing the Strategic Opportunities Fund.

== Funds ==
NIIF manages four funds: Master Fund, Private Markets, Strategic Opportunities Fund and India-Japan Fund. The funds were set up to make investments in India by raising capital from domestic and international institutional investors.

=== Master Fund ===
The Master Fund is an infrastructure fund with the objective of primarily investing in operating assets in the core infrastructure sectors such as roads, ports, airports, power etc. The Fund made its final close in December 2020, achieving a size of INR equivalent of US$2.34 billion, exceeding its target of US$2.1 billion.

=== Private Markets Fund ===
The Private Markets Fund (formerly known as Fund of Funds) is a US$600 million fund that anchors and/or invests in funds managed by fund managers who have good track records of delivering returns to investors. In February 2024, NIIF announced a commitment of INR 207 crores (~USD 25 million) from its Private Markets Fund to Amicus Capital's Fund II. With the commitment to Amicus Capital Fund II, PMF has utilised 100% of its aggregate capital commitments and has created a portfolio of eight funds across various strategies such as growth equity, venture capital, buyout and credit. Across the 8 funds, PMF has exposure to key sectors that drive the growth of the Indian economy including climate, healthcare, affordable housing, manufacturing, technology-enabled businesses, start-ups that drive innovation, financial services, and small and medium-sized businesses.

=== Strategic Opportunities Fund ===
Strategic Opportunities Fund invests in growth equity and provides long-term capital to strategic and growth-oriented sectors in the country with the aim to build domestic leaders.

=== India-Japan Fund ===
In October 2023, NIIFL announced the establishment of its first bilateral fund, the India-Japan Fund (IJF) in partnership with Japan Bank for International Cooperation (JBIC), a policy based financial institution wholly owned by the Government of Japan. IJF has a target corpus of INR 49 billion (~USD 600 million), with the Government of India contributing 49% and the remaining 51% contributed by JBIC. In January 2024, IJF made its first investment, when it invested ₹400 crore in Mahindra Last Mile Mobility Limited, which houses Mahindra & Mahindra Ltd's last-mile mobility business including three wheelers (Alfa, Treo, Zor) and four-wheeler SCV (Jeeto) brands.

== Investors in the Fund ==
The government of India has anchored the NIIFL funds and is a 49% investor in each of the funds managed by NIIFL.

NIIF Master Fund announced its final close in December 2020 at US$2.34 billion. Its investors include the Government of India, Abu Dhabi Investment Authority (ADIA), Temasek, Ontario Teachers’ Pension Plan, AustralianSuper, CPP Investments, PSP Investments, US International Development Finance Corporation, and domestic institutional investors including HDFC Group, ICICI Bank, Kotak Mahindra Life, and Axis Bank.

NIIF Private Markets Fund (formerly known as Fund of Funds) is a US$600 million fund with investors including the Government of India, the Asian Infrastructure Investment Bank, the Asian Development Bank, and the New Development Bank.

== Investments ==
=== NIIF Master Fund ===
NIIF Master Fund has 7 platforms across ports & logistics, smart meters, renewable energy, roads, airports and digital infrastructure.

In February 2018, Master Fund created its first platform along with DP World to invest in the ports and logistics sector in India. Together, NIIF and DP world announced the investment of $3 billion in the platform. In March 2018, Hindustan Infralog, the joint venture platform between DP World and the NIIF announced that it bought 90% stake in the logistics firm Continental Warehousing. In June 2022, NIIF expanded its partnership with DP World through an investment of around INR 2,250 crore (approximately US$300 million) to acquire 22.5% in Hindustan Ports Pvt Ltd (HPPL). Hindustan Ports is a wholly owned subsidiary of DP World. The transaction is under customary completion conditions and is expected to be closed by Q1 CY2023.

In February 2019, Master Fund announced a partnership with BII (formerly known as CDC Group) and EverSource Capital (a joint venture between Everstone Capital Asia and Lightsource BP) to cumulatively invest US$300 million in Ayana Renewable Power, the renewable energy platform founded by BII. In December 2020, all three investors injected further capital into the platform. Following this, Master Fund became the majority shareholder in the company. In January 2022, Ayana Renewable Power announced that its portfolio has crossed 1 GWac of operational renewable energy capacity.

In October 2019, Master Fund and Energy Efficiency Services Limited (EESL) announced the creation of a joint venture, IntelliSmart Infrastructure Private Limited, to implement, finance and operate the smart meter roll-out program of power distribution companies.

In November 2020, NIIF announced the acquisition of Essel Devanahalli Tollway (22 km six lane toll road in the state of Karnataka) and Essel Dichpally Tollway (60 km four lane toll road in the state of Telangana) through the Master Fund. These roads are managed by Athaang Infrastructure, NIIF's proprietary roads platform. In 2022, NIIF announced the acquisition of another two roads in Jammu & Kashmir to be managed by Athaang Infrastructure - Navayuga Quazigund Expressway Private Limited and SP Jammu Udhampur Highway Limited.

In December 2022, GMR Airports Limited (GAL), the airport business holding entity and a subsidiary of GMR Airports Infrastructure Limited and NIIF announced a financial partnership for NIIF to invest in the equity capital of three airport projects. These included the greenfield international airports at Mopa, Goa and Bhogapuram, Andhra Pradesh. The transaction envisaged NIIF making a primary investment of INR 6.31 billion in the form of Compulsory Convertible Debenture (CCD) in GMR Goa International Airport Limited (GGIAL), a special purpose vehicle to run and operate the Manohar International Airport Goa. In December 2023, NIIF announced that it is investing up to INR 6.75 billion in GMR Visakhapatnam International Airport Limited (GVIAL), a special purpose vehicle to develop and operate the Bhogapuram International Airport.

In January 2023, NIIF, Digital Edge (Singapore) Holdings Pte. Ltd., and AGP DC InvestCo Pte Ltd entered into a partnership to develop a pan-India portfolio of hyperscale data centres. The partnership's first project is a US$2 billion greenfield 300MW hyperscale facility in Navi Mumbai, which is India's biggest data centre hub offering access to infrastructure, including power and fibre connectivity.

In April 2024, NIIF announced an investment of around US$200 million in iBUS Network and Infrastructure Private Limited to support the growth of India's digital infrastructure. The investment in iBUS marked the eighth investment by NIIF's infrastructure fund and the second in digital infrastructure.

=== NIIF Private Markets Fund ===
PMF has utilised 100% of its aggregate capital commitments and has created a portfolio of eight funds across various strategies such as growth equity, venture capital, buyout and credit. Across the 8 funds, PMF has exposure to key sectors that drive the growth of the Indian economy including climate, healthcare, affordable housing, manufacturing, technology-enabled businesses, start-ups that drive innovation, financial services, and small and medium-sized businesses.

In April 2018, NIIF partnered with the UK government to launch the Green Growth Equity Fund (GGEF) under its Fund of Funds to invest in renewable energy, clean transportation, water and waste management, and other related sectors in India.

NIIF Fund of Funds and the UK Government committed GBP 120 million each into the Fund. GGEF announced its final close in January 2022 at US$741 million, making it one of the largest single-country funds focused on climate change in emerging markets.

In October 2018, NIIF Fund of Funds invested INR 660 crore in HDFC Capital Affordable Real Estate – 2 (H-CARE 2), an investment platform, managed by HDFC Capital Advisors, a wholly owned subsidiary of HDFC Ltd.

In October 2020, NIIF Funds of Funds committed to Somerset Indus Healthcare India Fund, an affordable healthcare fund.

In April 2022, NIIF Fund of Funds made its first commitment to a venture fund, YourNest Innovative Products VC Fund III. It made a US$15 million commitment and was the anchor investor in the Fund.

NIIF Fund of Funds has also invested in Multiples Private Equity Fund III managed by Multiples Alternate Asset Management Pvt. Limited focusing on the mid-market space and in Arpwood Partners Fund I, which focuses on the mid-market buyout/control segment.

In January 2023, NIIF Private Markets Fund (formerly Fund of Funds) made an anchor commitment of INR 400 crores to Lighthouse India Fund IV AIF.

In February 2024, NIIF Private Markets Fund committed INR 207 crores (~USD 25 million) to Amicus Capital's Fund II.

=== NIIF Strategic Opportunities Fund ===
In October 2018, NIIF announced the acquisition of IDFC Infrastructure Finance Limited (IDFC-IFL), a Non- Banking Finance Company registered with the Reserve Bank of India as an Infrastructure Debt Fund. This acquisition was made by NIIF's Strategic Opportunities Fund. The Fund incubated Aseem Infrastructure Finance Limited (AIFL) in 2020, an Infrastructure Financing Company that can lend across the project life cycle. As of FY22, the two entities had jointly disbursed over INR 10,000 crores.

On 22 November 2020, the Union Cabinet approved ₹6,000 crore investment by the Government of India into Aseem Infrastructure Finance Limited and NIIF Infrastructure Finance Limited as part of Atmanirbhar Bharat. Additionally, in 2022, Sumitomo Mitsui Banking Corporation (SMBC), a Japanese Bank also invested in AIFL.

In April 2021, the Strategic Opportunities Fund invested INR 2,100 crore in Manipal Hospitals, one of India's largest multi-speciality healthcare providers. In April 2023, NIIFL exited its investment in Manipal Hospitals, when Temasek acquired a majority stake in the company. The Strategic Opportunities Fund made its next investment in May 2022 in Ather Energy, an electric two-wheeler company. This was its first direct investment in the manufacturing sector and in electric mobility, both areas of national importance given India's green mission and decarbonisation goals.

=== India-Japan Fund ===
In January 2024, IJF made its first investment, committing ₹400 crore to Mahindra Last Mile Mobility Limited, which houses Mahindra & Mahindra Ltd's last-mile mobility business including three wheelers (Alfa, Treo, Zor) and four-wheeler SCV (Jeeto) brands.
