= State Capital Investment Corporation =

Sovereign wealth fund of Vietnam

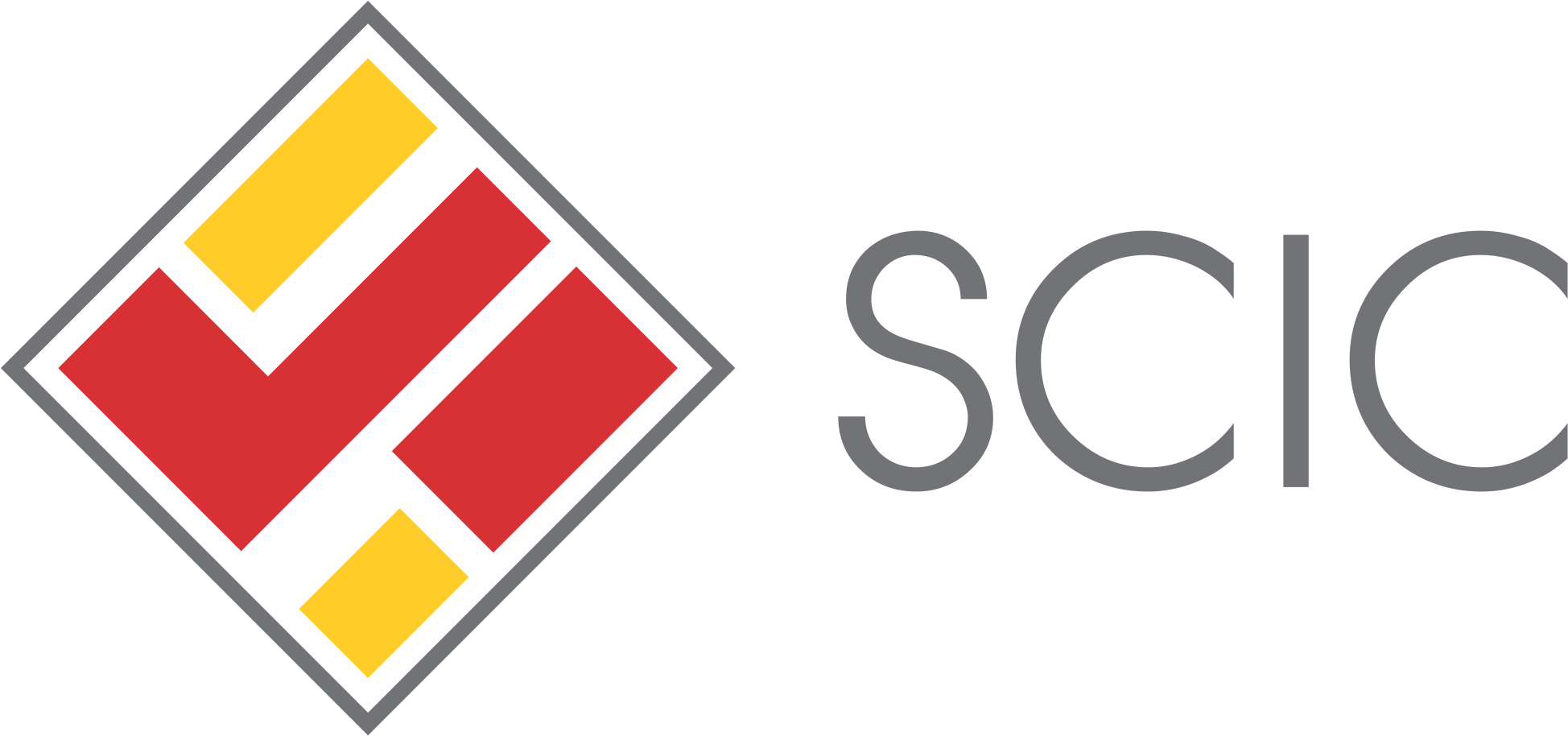
- Native name: Tổng công ty Đầu tư và Kinh doanh vốn nhà nước
- Genre: Holding company
- Founded: June 20, 2005; 21 years ago
- Owner: Government of Vietnam
- Website: www.scic.vn/index.php/en/

The State Capital Investment Corporation (SCIC; Vietnamese: Tổng công ty Đầu tư và Kinh doanh vốn nhà nước, lit. 'Corporation of Investment and Business using state capital') is a state-owned holding company considered the unofficial national wealth fund of Vietnam. It was established on 20 June 2005 under the mandate of Prime Minister Phan Văn Khải as part of a range of reforms aimed at enhancing the efficiency of state capital utilisation.

SCIC was created to reduce investment in domestic companies and government divisions in the Vietnamese government, and to diversify their holdings. The SCIC commenced operation in August 2006, and as of 30 May 2012 has around 416 linked firms in their portfolio.

== Board Members ==
SCIC board members include:

- Trần Văn Hiếu – Chairman and vice minister of finance
- Lại Văn Đạo – Chief Executive Officer
- Đỗ Hữu Hào – Board member and vice minister of industry and trade
- Cao Viết Sinh – Board member and vice minister of investment and planning
- Hoàng Nguyên Học – Board member and deputy general director
- Nguyễn Quốc Huy – Board member and deputy general director
- Lê Song Lai – Board member and deputy general director
- Nhữ Thị Hồng Liên – Board member and deputy general director
