= Revenue Equalization Reserve Fund =

Sovereign wealth fund of Kiribati

The Revenue Equalization Reserve Fund (RERF) is the sovereign wealth fund of the Pacific island republic of Kiribati.

The RERF was created in 1956 to act as a store of wealth for the country's earnings from phosphate mining, which at one time accounted for 50% of government revenue.

In 2009 the RERF was valued at A$570.5 million. The RERF assets declined from A$637 million (420 percent of GDP) in 2007 to A$570.5 million (350 percent of GDP) in 2009. As the result of the 2008 financial crisis, the RERF was exposed to failed Icelandic banks, and drawdowns were made by the government of Kiribati to finance budgetary shortfalls.

In 2018, it is set to reach 1 billion of A$.

In 2019, the closing market value of the RERF was A$1,153.4 million. In 2021, the closing market value was $1.352 billion and in 2024 it reached $1.523 billion.

== See also ==
- Economy of Kiribati
- Kiribati
