= Alabama Trust Fund =

Oil and gas co funded

The Alabama Trust Fund (ATF) is the wealth fund of the U.S. state of Alabama and was established in 1985 in response to a major offshore natural gas discovery in 1978. The fund is funded by royalty payments that are received each month from oil and gas companies and its assets total around $2.5 billion. The fund is invested in both fixed income and equities and is under the jurisdiction of the treasury of the State of Alabama. The fund is managed by external managers chosen by the board of trustees. The ATF's nine-member board is chaired by Governor Kay Ivey.

In 2012, a constitutional amendment was proposed that would take $145.8 million a year for three years from the trust fund's principal to help balance the state General Fund budget, but the board was divided over whether this amendment should be adopted.

== Background ==
Discovery of natural gas in Mobile Bay in 1978 led to active drilling and development of gas reserves below Alabama's coastal waters and the state received bids totaling $449 million for the rights to develop offshore tracts. In 1982, voters approved the creation of the Alabama Heritage Trust Fund (AHTF) with the revenues from this first sale of drilling rights. The AHTF income was used to finance a $520 million bond issue for capital outlay projects. On 14 August 1984, the state received more than $347 million from leases awarded on offshore tracts. In 1985, the voters of the state approved Amendment 450 creating the ATF as an irrevocable, permanent trust fund. The ATF was established to capture future revenues from sales of offshore drilling rights and from royalties on the resulting gas production. This amendment also terminated the Heritage Trust Fund in 2001 with all trust capital transferred to the ATF. The initial corpus of the ATF was $333,583,680. In December 2001, the Heritage Trust Fund transferred $467,002,694 in trust capital to the ATF.

The trust fund receives as principal ninety-nine percent of all oil and gas capital payments paid to the State with the remaining one-percent to the Department of Conservation-Lands Division. Amendment 450 directed that beginning in fiscal year 1989-90 one percent of the trust income be reinvested in the ATF to increase by one percent each subsequent year until a maximum of ten percent is reinvested each year. The remaining trust fund income is paid into the state's general fund.

In 1992, voters approved Amendment 543 establishing the Forever Wild Land Trust Fund (FWLT) for the purpose of acquiring, maintaining, and protecting unique lands and water areas within the state. This amendment redirected the trust income being reinvested in the ATF be paid to the Forever Wild Land Trust Fund.

In 2000, Amendment 666 was placed on the ballot and ratified by voters. This redistributes 35% of the oil and gas capital payments paid into the ATF to two newly created trust funds. The amendment also gives the Board the authority to transfer up to 75% of the realized and unrealized capital gains on investments, excluding fixed income securities, to the general fund.

Amendment 709, approved by voters in 2002, created the Education Trust Fund Rainy Day Account within the Alabama Trust Fund. In accordance with this amendment, a balance sheet account was established and credited with $248 million. In the event funds are withdrawn, an additional amount equal to 25% of the withdrawal must be transferred from the ATF to the County and Municipal Government Capital Improvement Fund.

On November 4, 2008, voters approved Amendment 803. This amendment (1) repealed Amendment 709; (2) re-established the Education Trust Fund Rainy Day Account within the Alabama Trust Fund and (3) established a General Fund Rainy Day Account within the Alabama Trust Fund (Act No. 2008-508). In accordance with this amendment, balance sheet accounts shall be established. In any year in which the Governor certifies proration in appropriations from the Education Trust Fund or the State General Fund, the Education Trust Fund Rainy Day Account or the General Fund Rainy Day Account shall be credited with oil and gas capital payments previously transferred into the Alabama Trust Fund. In addition, County and Municipal Government Capital Improvement Trust Fund will receive 25% of the amount transferred to the Education Trust Fund or the General Fund.

Interest and dividend income generated by the Alabama Trust Fund is distributed as follows:

- Ninety percent is transferred to the State's General Fund where it is appropriated to fund such services as prisons, mental health programs, elderly care, and public safety.
  - Acts 11-66 and 11-29 of the Code of Alabama provide that at such time that Trust Fund income equals or exceeds $60 million in the preceding fiscal year, the Legislature shall appropriate from the General Fund ten percent to the cities and ten percent to the counties. These monies are to assist the financing of capital improvement projects such as improving government buildings, streets, roads, bridges, and utilities.
- Ten percent is paid to the Forever Wild Land Trust Fund.

== See also ==
- Sovereign wealth fund
