= Permanent School Fund =

Sovereign wealth fund in Texas

Texas Permanent School Fund
- Type: Sovereign wealth fund
- Industry: Institutional investor
- Genre: Public lands, mineral rights, land use rights
- Founded: 1854
- Founder: Act of the Texas Legislature
- Headquarters: Austin, Texas, U.S.
- Total assets: US$48.3 billion (August 2020)
- Owner: Texas
- Website: Official website

The Texas Permanent School Fund is a sovereign wealth fund which serves to provide revenues for funding of public primary and secondary education in the US state of Texas. Its assets include many publicly owned lands within Texas and various other investments; as of the end of fiscal 2020 (August 31), the fund had an endowment of $48.3 billion. The fund is distinct from the Permanent University Fund, which funds most institutions in the University of Texas System and the Texas A&M University System, but no other public universities or schools in the state.

== Management ==
The lands and other assets in the fund are managed by the Texas General Land Office (GLO). Money is added to the fund whenever lands under GLO management are sold or leased, or when mineral royalties are collected on natural resource extraction on these lands. Royalties on oil and gas extraction are the fund's major source of revenues.

The General Land Office then reinvests these revenues and manages the investments. The interest produced by the fund's investments is distributed to the state's public school districts (in proportion to their average daily student attendance), but the fund itself may not be spent; this provision ensures that the fund will continue to grow, and its revenues will be available for Texas public schools in perpetuity.

== History and enlargement ==
In 1854 an act of the Texas Legislature established the Special School Fund (a predecessor to the Permanent School Fund), intended to fund the state's public school system. The fund was endowed with $2 million taken from the money paid to Texas by the federal government in return for Texas's claimed territory in what are now parts of New Mexico, Colorado and Oklahoma.

After the Civil War and Reconstruction, in 1876 Texas enacted a new constitution which changed the fund's name to the Permanent School Fund and transferred half of the public lands owned by the state to the fund as its new endowment. The 1876 constitution also tasked the General Land Office with the management of these lands and the fund.

In 1953, the United States Congress passed the Submerged Lands Act, which returned to the States the navigable territorial waters that had been historically the property of the States. Because Texas's historical territorial waters originated with its period as a sovereign state, the US Supreme Court ruled in United States v. Louisiana (1960) 363 U.S. 1 (1960) that Texas was in the unique position of owning territory out to three leagues (10.35 miles) from its coastline. These lands were also added to the Permanent School Fund, further enlarging its assets.
