= West Virginia Future Fund =

Sovereign wealth fund of West Virginia

The West Virginia Future Fund is a permanent trust fund which began operations in March 2014. It was established via the passage of SB 461 and SJR 14 to make the fund constitutionally protected under West Virginia law. Funding comes from a 25% natural gas and oil severance tax. Under the law, only the interest and other income would be spent, while the principal would accumulate.

Beginning in 2020, the fund started paying out dividends to finance activities such as education, human resource development, economic development, infrastructure development, and tax relief. The fund was expected to reach $127 million by 2019. It will remain in the control of the West Virginia Treasurer's Office and will be invested by the West Virginia Investment Management Board.

In 2023, SB 444 permanently closed the fund. The finance chair, Eric Tarr, stated that the bill did not come from them but the tax department. He further stated that previous year's legislation made future contributions to the fund impossible, and that there was no money in the fund.
