= Permanent University Fund =

Sovereign wealth fund in Texas

- Company type: Sovereign wealth fund
- Industry: Institutional investor
- Genre: Public Lands, Mineral Rights, Land Use Rights
- Founded: 1876
- Founder: Texas Legislature
- Headquarters: Austin, Texas, United States of America
- Key people: Paul L. Foster, chairman: Bruce Zimmerman, CEO
- Total assets: US$41.6 billion (2015) (does not include public land holdings)
- Owner: State of Texas
- Website: The Permanent University Fund (PUF)

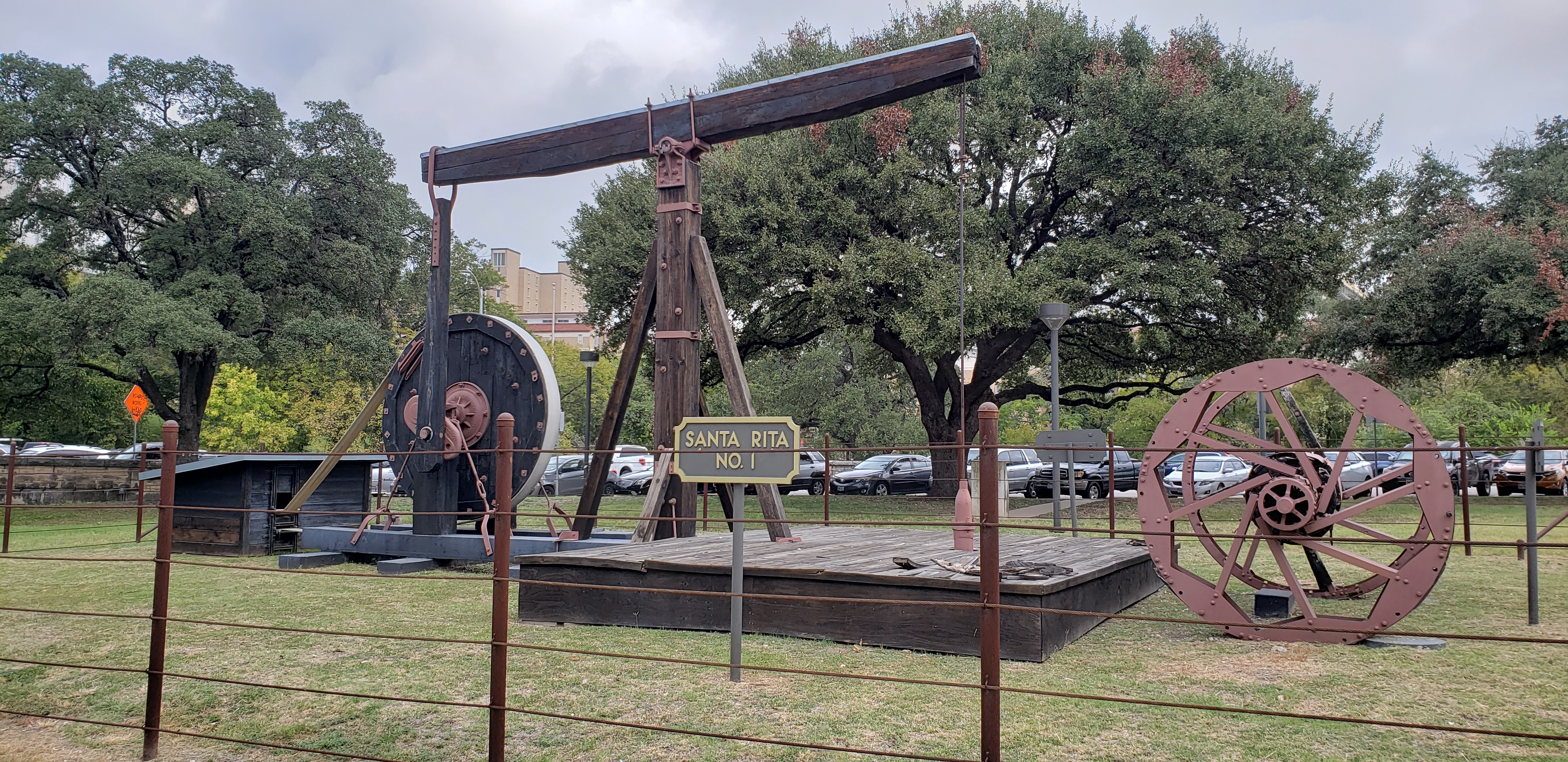
Santa Rita No. 1 rig, used in the discovery of the Big Lake Oil Field in 1923.

The Permanent University Fund (PUF) is a sovereign wealth fund created by the State of Texas to fund public higher education within the state. A portion of the returns from the PUF are annually directed towards the Available University Fund (AUF), which distributes the funds according to provisions set forth by the 1876 Texas Constitution, subsequent constitutional amendments, and the board of regents of the Texas A&M University System and University of Texas System. The PUF provides extra funds, above monies from tax revenues, to the UT System and the Texas A&M System which collectively have approximately 50 percent of state public university students. The PUF does not provide any funding to other public Universities in the State of Texas.

== History ==
The Permanent University Fund was established by the 1876 Constitution of the State of Texas. Initially, its assets included one-tenth of University of Texas at Austin lands bordering the railroads (UT Austin was granted 1 million acres (4,000 km^{2}) in West Texas as compensation) as well as 1 million acres (4,000 km^{2}) additional. In addition, the 1876 Constitution organized the University of Texas System, under which governance of Texas A&M University and UT Austin was placed. The original Constitution provided for preference in PUF investment in Texas and U.S. bonds. In 1883, Texas and Pacific Railroad returned 1 million acres (4,000 km^{2}), deemed too worthless to survey, to the State Government, which turned the land over to the PUF. Initially, the little revenue PUF earned from its lands were from grazing leases.

The terms of the annexation of the Republic of Texas in 1845 meant that Texas kept its public lands. The 1894 discovery of oil in Corsicana, Texas and the 1901 discovery of oil at Spindletop in Beaumont, Texas, began a subsequent oil boom in Texas and the western U.S. In 1901, the Texas Legislature authorized UT Austin to "sell, lease and otherwise control" oil and mineral rights for PUF land. In late 1916, after a report was submitted to the Land Commission of the UT board of regents, the board forbade the sale of any University lands, including those of the PUF. On 28 May 1923, the Santa Rita No. 1 oil well, in Reagan County discovered the first oil on PUF land; in the following decades, the PUF's revenue made UT Austin among the best-endowed in the nation.

In 1924, the UT Regent Robert Story requested that the legislature direct oil rights revenue directly into the Available University Fund (AUF); the 29th legislature complied on 3 April 1925 by passing House Bill 246. The March 10, 1926, Texas Supreme Court case State ex rel Attorney General, v. Hatcher, decided against State Treasurer W. Gregory Hatcher, who refused to comply with Attorney General Dan Moody's demands that oil rights revenue be placed into the PUF rather than the AUF. The Texas Supreme Court concluded that the 1876 Constitution directed subterranean revenue to be "corpus of the estate" rather than UT Austin disposable income.

In 1928, State Attorney General Claude Pollard issued a legal opinion that the UT board of regents could issue bonds against the AUF, the account that holds the annual distributions of the PUF. In 1931, the legislature authorized UT Regent-requested bonds to improve UT Austin's buildings and campus in general. As the provision was repealed in 1932, it granted the only time ever that PUF principal was spent. The AUF's distributions were directed, in 1931, by the legislature such that 2/3 of the money would go to UT Austin and 1/3 to Texas A&M, and also extended to be available for purchase of equipment and building construction. In 1947, after World War II and during the education boom from the Servicemen's Readjustment Act of 1944, a constitutional amendment was passed that authorized the issuance of $15 million in AUF bonds, $10 million to the UT System and $5 million to the Texas A&M System.

1956 saw another amendment to the state constitution, this time setting the maximum AUF-backed bond issuance equal to 20% of the PUF's total asset value excluding land, as well as allowing Southwestern Medical School, Health Science Center at Houston, and M. D. Anderson Cancer Center, all of the UT System, access to AUF funds. In addition, the 1956 amendment guaranteed the 2/3 UT, 1/3 A&M AUF split that the legislature had directed in 1931. In 1968, the PUF constitution was amended again to include a broader range of both corporate bonds and investments available to PUF, as well as applying a "prudent person" standard for some amendments.

The State Attorney General in 1978 issued an opinion that interest accruing in the PUF should be used to pay outstanding bonds and finance permanent educational improvements, per the PUF constitution. In 1984, the bond issuance capacity of the PUF was raised to 30% and the issuance of AUF funds was expanded to all existing University of Texas System and Texas A&M University System schools; another voter-approved amendment the same year authorized the creation of the Higher Education Assistance Fund, to help all public higher education institutions not covered by the PUF. As oil rights revenue was dropping from $262 million in 1981 to $57 million in 1995, the 1991 Texas Legislature reduced funding for the UT and Texas A&M University Systems by about one-quarter. This placed increased pressure for the PUF to make up much of the difference, even after the 1984 expansion of the PUF's list of beneficiaries. On 1 March 1996, the UT System board of regents authorized the nonprofit University of Texas Investment Management Company (UTIMCO) to manage UT System assets, including all of the PUF.

A 1988 constitutional amendment eliminated all investment restrictions related to the PUF for the UT board of directors in favor of adopting the "prudent person" standard for all investments, which was subsequently amended in 1999 to the "prudent investor" standard for investments. Another 1999 statewide vote adopted an amendment that made further changes to the PUF. The first was that distributions to the AUF would equal both realized (income return) and unrealized (capital gains) PUF assets. The second directed payments to PUF expenses come from PUF assets; the third directed the establishment of an investment and return policy that would preserve both a stable AUF distribution and the real value of the investments.

In 2001, PUF annual distribution to the AUF was changed from 4.50% to 4.75%. On 7 February 2008, after months of study, the UT board of regents authorized an increase in AUF annual transfers, from 4.75% of the PUF value to 5.00%, citing recent PUF growth of more than 10% per year and unrest over the large annual increases in tuition at UT Austin. The Texas A&M System chancellor lauded the increased distribution, which now matched other Texas A&M endowment distributions.

== Assets ==
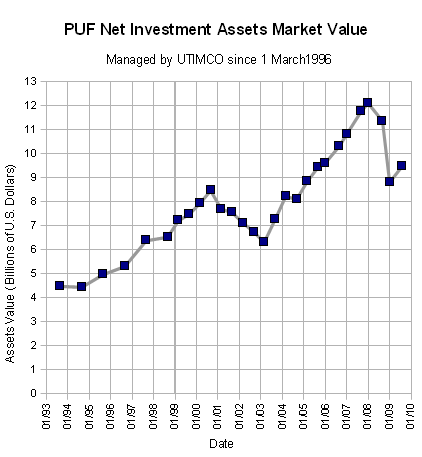
PUF fiduciary assets, 1993-2008

According to Olien and Olien, the original one million acres was "much less desirable land in arid western Texas...it had no timber, was too arid for small farming, and had no special mineral resources that anyone was aware of." The land was located in Crockett, Irion, Pecos, Reagan, Schleicher, Terrell, and Upton counties. In 1883, additional land was added in Andrews, Crane, Culberson, and Winkler counties, which "was no more desirable than that granted in 1876, but there was at least twice as much of it." The Big Lake oil discovery, within the Permian Basin, revised the value of the land, and ensured a richly endowed university system.

In 1900, the Permanent University Fund earned approximately $40,000, mostly from grazing leases; by 1925, income had increased to $2,000 per day (about $700,000 per year), and by 1943 was just under $1 million per year. In the late 1950s, the PUF earned about $8,513,000 per year and was valued above $283,642,000; in 1990, the PUF earned $266,119,000 and was valued at $3,541,314,800. Currently, PUF land assets deliver proceeds through oil, gas, sulfur, and water royalties, rentals on mineral leases, and gains on fiduciary investments. Grazing leases and other surface rights income are distributed to the AUF.

As of December 2008 figures, the PUF holds approximately $8.8 billion in investments and 2,100,000 acres (8,500 km^{2}) of land located in 21 counties, mostly in West Texas. Each year, five percent of the PUF's value is transferred to the AUF, which then distributes the money. The PUF exclusively serves institutions in the University of Texas System, which receives two-thirds of its proceeds, and the Texas A&M System, which receives the remaining one-third. As of 2008, the University of Texas System received the fifth-largest endowment in the nation, and the Texas A&M System received the tenth-largest. At one time, the PUF was the chief source of income for The University of Texas at Austin, but today its revenues account for less than twenty percent of the university's annual budgets. Of the 2007-08 year's $1 billion core academic budget of UT Austin, the AUF's funding accounted for $143 million.

== Management ==
The PUF's land assets are managed by the University of Texas System Administration. The PUF's fiduciary assets are managed by the University of Texas/Texas A&M Investment Management Company (UTIMCO), a nonprofit group formed to manage various assets of the UT and Texas A&M Systems and governed by a volunteer board of directors. The board is composed of three members of the UT System board of regents, four members selected by the UT System board of regents, and two members selected by the Texas A&M University System board of regents. Of these, at least three of the members appointed by the UT System regents and one appointed by the Texas A&M System regents must be investment professionals. Additionally, the UT System chancellor is normally one of that system's seven representatives on the UTIMCO board. In addition, UTIMCO has a chief executive officer and chief investment officer appointed by the board and a president appointed by the CEO and board; all employees of UTIMCO except the nine-member board of directors receive a salary and are eligible for annual bonuses.

We did what we thought was right. We felt like we had an obligation. Some people may feel like you can walk away from your contracts. We had an obligation to these people.

— Robert Rowling, UTIMCO Chairman

In February 2009, UTIMCO drew criticism from the state's legislative and executive branches for awarding bonuses to employees despite the 2008 financial crisis. Robert Rowling, chairman of UTIMCO and vice chairman of the UT Austin board of regents, insisted that the bonuses he authorized were for the fiscal year ending 31 July 2008, in which the PUF net fiduciary assets decreased by 3.26%, or $383 million, as compared to nearly 14% for the Dow Jones Industrial Average. The chairman of the board of regents defended Rowling, stating that the contracts obligated bonus payment and the large amounts, $1.05 million for the UTIMCO CEO and $2.3 million for other employees combined, were fairly inflexible.

Governor Rick Perry and Lieutenant Governor David Dewhurst criticized "[W]e can't imagine how such compensation is justified considering that in the same month this meeting was held, reports surfaced that UTIMCO's earnings for the year had dropped an estimated 23 percent." Perry's spokeswoman attacked the contracts, stating, "The compensation structure ought to incorporate the health of the fund, whereby incentives are not immediately paid out if the fund is in the red." State Senator Kevin Eltife criticized CEO Bruce Zimmerman's bonus. "Most people out there on the street are scared to death and we just paid you a million-dollar bonus ... If there's that much money floating around, maybe there's too much." After heated interrogation by the State Senate Finance Committee, Rowling resigned from both his chairmanship of UTIMCO and vice chairmanship of UT Austin's board of regents.

== Allowed institutions ==
The following are all available beneficiaries, as of 2022, of the Available University Fund, which distributes the annual dividends and returns of the Permanent University Fund. The Texas Constitution (Article 7, Section 18) stipulates that most current institutions under the University of Texas System and Texas A&M System are eligible to receive PUF profits through the AUF, and that a two-thirds vote of each house in the state legislature is necessary to create a new institution as part of either system, which would then be automatically eligible for funds.

Other Texas public universities—notably all institutions in the University of Houston System, the University of North Texas System, the Texas State System, the Texas Tech System, and some UT System and Texas A&M System institutions—are prohibited by law from sharing the income from this endowment, but in 1984 a second fund was created to one day serve those schools: the Higher Education Fund (also known as the Higher Education Assistance Fund), a much smaller fund. Addition of the other university systems or individual institutions to the Permanent University Fund would require an amendment to the Texas Constitution or a two-thirds vote in the legislature.

A recently added institution to the list of allowed institutions is the University of Texas Rio Grande Valley, which was founded in 2013 with the merger of the University of Texas–Pan American and University of Texas at Brownsville and began full operation in 2015. The predecessor schools were not eligible for PUF allocations, but the law that created UTRGV made the new institution PUF-eligible, and was passed by the required two-thirds vote of both legislative chambers.

The most recently added institution is Stephen F. Austin State University (SFA), which joined the UT System starting with the 2023–24 academic year. The law that added SFA to the UT System specified that it would become PUF-eligible upon joining the system. The measure was passed unanimously by both legislative chambers, and was signed into law on May 10, 2023.

Permanent University Fund Institutions
University of Texas System		Texas A&M University System	
University of Texas at Arlington	University of Texas Health Science Center at Houston	Texas A&M University	Texas A&M AgriLife Extension Service
University of Texas at Austin	University of Texas Health Science Center at San Antonio	Prairie View A&M University	Texas A&M AgriLife Research
University of Texas at Dallas	University of Texas Institute of Texan Cultures at San Antonio	Tarleton State University	Texas A&M Engineering Extension Service
University of Texas at El Paso	University of Texas M. D. Anderson Cancer Center	Texas A&M University at Galveston	Texas A&M Forest Service
University of Texas of the Permian Basin	University of Texas Medical Branch	Texas A&M Health Science Center	Texas A&M Transportation Institute
University of Texas at San Antonio	University of Texas Southwestern Medical Center	Texas A&M University System Administration	
University of Texas at Tyler	University of Texas Rio Grande Valley		
University of Texas System Administration	Stephen F. Austin State University		
source: Texas Constitution, Article 7, Section 7.18(a) and Section 7.18(b)

== See also ==
- Sovereign wealth fund
- List of U.S. colleges and universities by endowment
- The Government Pension Fund of Norway
- Alaska Permanent Fund
- Earmark (finance)
- Permanent School Fund
