= Oregon Common School Fund =

The Oregon Common School Fund is part of the budget of the U.S. state of Oregon. It derives from the use of state lands dedicated to public schools. The Oregon State Land Board, composed according to the Oregon Constitution of the Governor, Secretary of State, and Treasurer of Oregon, has responsibility for managing the fund.

As of 2007, the fund's principal was valued at $1,169,000,000. In 2024, the fund was worth $2 billion. From 2000 to 2008, annual disbursements have varied from as low as $13.3 million (in 2004) to $55.4 million (in 2008). In 2025, the fund distributed $76.8 million with an average distribution of $389,607 per district.

== See also ==
- Land-grant university
