= North Dakota Legacy Fund =

Sovereign wealth fund of North Dakota

The North Dakota Legacy Fund is a sovereign wealth fund of the U.S. state of North Dakota. Contributions to the fund must include "[t]hirty percent of total revenue derived from taxes on oil and gas production or extraction." The fund was established by ballot initiative in 2010. The fund is modeled after the Norwegian Sovereign Wealth Fund. As of April 30, 2026, the fund is valued at $14.5 billion. Projections made at the time the Legacy Fund was established estimate that it will be worth between $75 and $105 billion by 2039; between $149 and $240 billion by 2050; and between $240 and $450 billion by 2060. The fund intends to diversify wealth obtained from oil extraction into other sectors. Money in the fund could not be spent by the state legislature until 2017.

== Background ==
North Dakota has a commodity-based economy. North Dakota experienced an uptick in oil extraction from 2008-2014. The legacy fund was established to ensure that the financial windfall gained from the Bakken Oil Boom would benefit the state in the long-run, even if oil prices collapse.

== Use of funds ==
The North Dakota Legislative Assembly operates on a biennial cycle. The Legislative Assembly meets once every two years, and is constitutionally limited in the number of days it may meet each biennium. Since the legislature meets every two years, state budgets are generally made on a two-year basis.

The legacy fund operates more or less along the lines of a private equity fund. Each biennial cycle, the legislature chooses how much of the investment interest to spend in its budget, and how much to leave unspent for reinvestment in the fund.

== 2023 HB 1379 ==
In 2023, the North Dakota Legislative Assembly passed House Bill 1379, a bill which divvied Legacy Fund earnings for the 2023-24 biennium while providing a roadmap for use of future interest payments. Before House Bill 1379, the first $150 million in Legacy Fund earnings are spent on infrastructure bonds and funding the state employee retirement system. The next $60 million fund roads and highways under the old law.

House Bill 1379 keeps these allocations in place, while also establishing $485 million in new spending beginning July 1, 2023. The first $200 million funds tax relief. The next $30 million is allocated for grants and loans aimed at cutting carbon output in the energy sector. The next $10 million funds public university research in the state. The next $10 million funds companies deemed to be advancing technology. The next $10 million funds workforce development in the state. The next $90 million funds "legacy projects," such as tourism or other economic development. The next $100 million funds the repair of bridges. The next $15 million funds infrastructure enhancements tied to value-added agriculture. The final $15 million funds bioscience innovation grants. Any funds after this point go into a rainy day fund.
