= List of bus routes in Athens =

This is a list of all the bus routes in Athens, Greece.

== Symbolism ==
Symbol	Explanation
Red Background	Defunct route.
Green Background	Interurban routes operated by the Consortium of Public Transport in Attica.
Blue Background	E.THE.L schedules (before 2011).
Yellow Background	I.L.P.A.P. schedules (before 2011).
Purple Background	Trolleybus routes operated by buses on trial.
Trunk Route	Routes that were part of the trunk route system of 1995.
Central Route	Routes that serve the municipalities of Athens and Piraeus or adjacent areas.
Southern Route	Routes that connect the southern suburbs directly with the city centre or intermunicipal routes that serve the southern suburbs.
Eastern Route	Routes that connect the eastern suburbs directly with the city centre or intermunicipal routes that serve the eastern suburbs.
Northern Route	Routes that connect the northern suburbs directly with the city centre or intermunicipal routes that serve the northern suburbs.
Western Route	Routes that connect the western suburbs directly with the city centre or intermunicipal routes that serve the western suburbs.
Local Route	Routes that act as feeder routes to the metro or the trunk routes.
Trolleybus Route	Routes that are served by trolleybuses.
Express Route	Routes with limited stops, usually bypassing several stops served by regular routes.
Airport Route	Routes that serve the Athens International Airport.
Intermunicipal Route	Routes that connect multiple suburban municipalities, on most occasions bypassing the city center.
Scholar Route	Routes that operate specifically to serve a certain educational institute. These routes do not operate during weekends or in the summer.
Night Route	Routes that operate between 0:00 and 5:00 a.m.
24h Route	Routes that operate on a 24-hour basis.
Limited Route	Routes that operate for only a limited time period (e.g., only in the noon or in the evening) during the day, or routes that have very low frequency (less than 1 trip per hour).
Special Route	Routes that operate very limited rush-hour trips that run on no specific frequency.
The route length and number of stops account for a trip from start to end and vice versa.
Maps Legend
STOP	Current stop.
STOP	Express stop.
STOP	Former stop.
•	Stop with telematics board.
•	Stop with bench and cover.
•	Stop with telematics board, bench and cover.
•	Stop without telematics board, bench or cover.

== 2000-Today ==
=== Trunk Routes ===
The trunk routes were created in 1995 as part of an attempt to create a bus rapid transit system in Athens. They actually were renamings of existing routes in order to have a common special numbering based letters and a common number when using the same street to exit the city centre. For example, all routes using the number 8 (A8, B8, Γ8) are passing from Patission street with a common start at Polytechneio. There were also express routes, whose name started with the letter E, that were special express rush-hour alterations of the A-lettered route of a certain line (for example route E7 followed the exact same path as route A7, but it was not calling on some stops). The main goal of these lines was to remove a vast number of bus routes from the Athens city center, which was heavily affected by traffic congestion at the time. With the creation of trunk routes most of the bus routes were relocated in suburbs. For example, routes "538 Kanigos-Kifissia and "508 Kanigos-Agios Stefanos" used to have a common start at Kanigos Square and then followed Kifissias Avenue until Kifissia, where 538 was turning in Kifissia whilst 508 continued further north to Agios Stefanos. After the trunk route system these routes were renamed to "A7 Kanigos-Kifissia" and "508 Kifissia-Agios Stefanos". Many routes like 508 had their starts moved to suburbs where a trunk route finished. This scheme was created only for distant suburbs of Athens such as Agios Stefanos, Vouliagmeni, Paiania, Ano Liossia and Mandra. In suburbs near the city centre, such as Ilioupoli, Vyronas, Psychiko and Galatsi, there was not any factual change on the bus routes. The routes initially had a distinct colour for each line but after 1998-1999 they practically had no difference from a normal bus route. These routes were heavily overshadowed by the metro system after its opening in 2000. In 2007, after the metro extension to Egaleo opened, the metro system had practically taken over the role of a trunk route. After 2011, when ETHEL (Athens Bus Company) and ILPAP (Athens Trolleybus Company) merged to avoid bankruptcy (both companies were heavily affected from the financial crisis) and formed OSY, many of these routes were discontinued and they were completely replaced by the metro system. Today only 19 of the 45 initial trunk routes are still in service (not counting the express routes), while only 17 have a trunk route role (routes B2 and B12 have been localised but they still use the trunk route numbering system).

Trunk Routes
Number		Route	Route Type	Length (in km)	Stops	Operating Hours		Daily Trips		Avg. Frequency		Map
A1	A1	Piraeus-Voula	Trunk	45.2	122	5:00-0:00 (Mon-Sun)		79 (Note: 1 extended to Ekklisia Varis) (Mon-Fri); 49 (Sat); 39 (Sun)		15' (Mon-Fri); 20-25' (Sat); 25-30' (Sun)		
A1	A1	Piraeus-Voula	Trunk	45.2	122	5:00-0:00 (Note: E1: 6:00-20:30 (Mon-Fri)) (Mon-Sun)		167 (Note: 90 as A1, 38 as B1 and 39 as E1) (Mon-Fri); 101 (Note: 71 as A1 and 30 as B1) (Sat); 84 (Note: 59 as A1 and 25 as B1) (Sun)		Common Section: 5' (Mon-Fri); 10-15' (Sat-Sun); A1/E1-only Section: 5-10' (Mon-Fri); 15' (Sat); 20' (Sun); B1-only Section: 25' (Mon-Fri); 30' (Sat); 35-40' (Sun)		
A1	B1	Piraeus-Ano Glyfada	Trunk			5:00-0:00 (Mon-Sun)		167 (Mon-Fri); 101 (Sat); 84 (Sun)		Common Section: 5' (Mon-Fri); 10-15' (Sat-Sun); A1/E1-only Section: 5-10' (Mon-Fri); 15' (Sat); 20' (Sun); B1-only Section: 25' (Mon-Fri); 30' (Sat); 35-40' (Sun)		
A1	E1	Piraeus-Voula (Express)	Express Trunk	45.2	48	5:00-0:00 (Mon-Sun)		167 (Mon-Fri); 101 (Sat); 84 (Sun)		Common Section: 5' (Mon-Fri); 10-15' (Sat-Sun); A1/E1-only Section: 5-10' (Mon-Fri); 15' (Sat); 20' (Sun); B1-only Section: 25' (Mon-Fri); 30' (Sat); 35-40' (Sun)		
B1		Piraeus-Ano Glyfada	Trunk	43.3	124	5:25-22:20 (Mon-Fri); 6:00-22:20 (Sat-Sun)		28 (Mon-Fri); 24 (Sat); 17 (Sun)		35-40' (Mon-Fri); 40-45' (Sat); 60' (Sun)		
B1		Pre-2007 route B1 is listed as part of route A1 as they shared large common sections.										
A2	A2	Akadimia-Voula (via Amfitheas Ave.)	Trunk	42.1	114	5:30-0:00 (Mon-Sun)		84 (Mon-Fri); 50 (Sat); 39 (Sun)		10-15' (Mon-Fri); 20-25' (Sat); 25-30' (Sun)		
A2	A2	Akadimia-Voula (via Amfitheas Ave.)	Trunk	42.1	114	5:30-0:00 (Note: E2: 6:00-20:40 (Mon-Fri)) (Mon-Sun)		106 (Note: 82 as A2 (1 extended to Ekklisia Varis) 24 as E2) (Mon-Fri); 73 (Sat); 67 (Sun)		10' (Mon-Fri); 15' (Sat-Sun)		
A2	E2	Akadimia-Voula (Express)	Express Trunk		42	5:30-0:00 (Mon-Sun)		106 (Mon-Fri); 73 (Sat); 67 (Sun)		10' (Mon-Fri); 15' (Sat-Sun)		
B2		Syngrou/Fix Station-Agios Kosmas (via Paraliaki)	Local	25.2	61	5:15-23:55 (Mon-Sat); 6:00-23:25 (Sun)		78 (Mon-Fri); 40 (Sat); 28 (Sun)		10-15' (Mon-Fri); 25-30' (Sat); 35' (Sun)		
B2		Akadimia-Agios Kosmas (via Paraliaki)	Trunk	26.0	67	5:15-23:50 (Mon-Sun)		50 (Note: 6 extended to Elliniko) (Mon-Fri); 42 (Note: 4 extended to Elliniko) (Sat); 34 (Sun)		20-25' (Mon-Sat); 30-35' (Sun)		
B2		Akadimia-Alimou Ave.-Elliniko (via Paraliaki)	Trunk		70	5:15-23:15 (Mon-Sun)		57 (Mon-Fri); 54 (Sat-Sun)		20' (Mon-Sun)		
A3	Α3	Akadimia-Glyfada (via Vouliagmenis Ave.)	Trunk	33.0	87	5:10-0:00 (Mon-Sun)		72 (Mon-Fri); 47 (Sat); 39 (Sun)		15' (Mon-Fri); 25' (Sat); 30' (Sun)		
A3	Α3	Akadimia-Glyfada (Evryali) (via Vouliagmenis Ave.)	Trunk	32.5	91	5:10-0:00 (Mon-Sun)	5:10-0:00 (Mon-Sun)	86 (Note: 44 as A3 and 42 as B3) (Mon-Fri); 72 (Note: 37 as A3 and 35 as B3) (Sat); 51 (Note: 26 as A3 and 25 as B3) (Sun)	96 (Note: 47 as A3 and 49 as B3) (Mon-Fri); 83 (Note: 42 as A3 and 41 as B3) (Sat); 64 (Note: 33 as A3 and 31 as B3) (Sun)	Common Section: 10-15' (Mon-Sat); 20-25' (Sun); Individual Sections: 25' (Mon-Fri); 30' (Sat); 45' (Sun)	Common Section: 10-15' (Mon-Sat); 15-20' (Sun); Individual Sections: 25-30' (Mon-Sat); 35' (Sun)	
A3	B3	Akadimia-Glyfada (Karachaliou) (via Vouliagmenis Ave.)	Trunk	33.0	86	5:10-0:00 (Mon-Sun)	5:10-0:00 (Mon-Sun)	86 (Mon-Fri); 72 (Sat); 51 (Sun)	96 (Mon-Fri); 83 (Sat); 64 (Sun)	Common Section: 10-15' (Mon-Sat); 20-25' (Sun); Individual Sections: 25' (Mon-Fri); 30' (Sat); 45' (Sun)	Common Section: 10-15' (Mon-Sat); 15-20' (Sun); Individual Sections: 25-30' (Mon-Sat); 35' (Sun)	
B3		Listed as part of route A3 as they shared large common sections.										
A4		Akadimia-Kato Ilioupoli-Argyroupoli-Terpsithea	Trunk	26.2	80	5:00-0:00 (Mon-Sun)		78 (Note: 1 to Kato Ilioupoli) (Mon-Fri); 55 (Sat); 37 (Sun)		15' (Mon-Fri); 20' (Sat); 30' (Sun)		
A4		Akadimia-Argyroupoli-Terpsithea	Trunk	25.0	72	5:00-0:00 (Mon-Sun)		65 (Mon-Fri); 47 (Sat); 38 (Sun)		15-20' (Mon-Fri); 20-25' (Sat); 30' (Sun)		
B4		Akadimia-Argyroupoli-Sourmena	Trunk	24.7		6:15-23:20 (Mon-Fri); 6:15-22:30 (Sat-Sun)		39 (Mon-Fri); 28 (Sat); 26 (Sun)		25' (Mon-Fri); 35' (Sat); 40' (Sun)		
A5		Akadimia-Agia Paraskevi-Anthousa	Trunk	29.9	92	5:00-23:40 (Mon-Sun)		86 (Mon-Fri); 57 (Sat); 42 (Sun)		10-15' (Mon-Fri); 20' (Sat); 25-30' (Sun)		
A5		Akadimia-Agia Paraskevi-Anthousa	Trunk	29.9	92	5:00-23:40 (Mon-Sun)		102 (Mon-Fri); 83 (Sat); 67 (Sun)		10-15' (Mon-Sun)		
B5		Larissa Station-Alexandras Ave.-Agia Paraskevi	Trunk	26.9	91	5:00-0:00 (Mon-Sat); 5:30-0:00 (Sun)		87 (Mon-Fri); 63 (Sat); 38 (Sun)		10-15' (Mon-Fri); 15-20' (Sat); 30' (Sun)		
B5		Larissa Station-Alexandras Ave.-Agia Paraskevi	Trunk	26.9	91	5:00-0:00 (Mon-Sat); 5:30-0:00 (Sun)		102 (Mon-Fri); 88 (Sat); 67 (Sun)		10-15' (Mon-Sun)		
Γ5		Listed as part of route 416 as it was an extended variant of the specific route										
A6	A6	Mouseio-Halandri (via Ethn. Antistaseos)	Trunk			5:00-0:00 (Note: E6: 6:00-20:00 (Mon-Fri)) (Mon-Sat); 5:30-0:00 (Sun)		130 (Note: 53 as A6, 51 as B6 and 26 as E6) (Mon-Fri); 100 (Note: 51 as A6 and 49 as B6) (Sat); 83 (Note: 42 as A1 and 41 as B1) (Sun)		Common Section: 5-10' (Mon-Sat); 10-15' (Sun); A6/Β6 Common Section: 10-15' (Mon-Sun); A6/B6 Individual Sections: 20-25' (Mon-Sat); 25-30' (Sun)		
A6	B6	Mouseio-Halandri (via Sidera)	Trunk			5:00-0:00 (Mon-Sat); 5:30-0:00 (Sun)		130 (Mon-Fri); 100 (Sat); 83 (Sun)		Common Section: 5-10' (Mon-Sat); 10-15' (Sun); A6/Β6 Common Section: 10-15' (Mon-Sun); A6/B6 Individual Sections: 20-25' (Mon-Sat); 25-30' (Sun)		
A6	E6	Mouseio-Halandri (Express)	Express Trunk			5:00-0:00 (Mon-Sat); 5:30-0:00 (Sun)		130 (Mon-Fri); 100 (Sat); 83 (Sun)		Common Section: 5-10' (Mon-Sat); 10-15' (Sun); A6/Β6 Common Section: 10-15' (Mon-Sun); A6/B6 Individual Sections: 20-25' (Mon-Sat); 25-30' (Sun)		
Β6		Listed as part of route Α6 as they shared large common sections.										
E6		Mouseio-Halandri (Express)	Express Trunk	22.6	37	6:00-19:50 (Mon-Fri)	27 (Mon-Fri)	30' (Mon-Fri)				
A7	A7	Stournari-Kifissia (Platanou Sq.)	Trunk	29.5	84	5:00-0:00 (Mon-Sun)		91 (Note: 1 extended to Agios Stefanos) (Mon-Fri); 61 (Sat); 47 (Sun)		10-15' (Mon-Fri); 20' (Sat); 25' (Sun)		
A7	A7	Kanigos-Kifissia-Nea Erythraia	Trunk	40.6	117	5:00-0:00 (Note: E7: 6:00-20:00 (Mon-Fri)) (Mon-Sun)		169 (Note: 67 as A7, 67 as B7 and 35 as E7) (Mon-Fri); 112 (Note: 56 as A7 and 56 as B7) (Sat); 81 (Note: 41 as A7 and 40 as B7) (Sun)		Common Section: 5' (Mon-Fri); 10' (Sat); 15' (Sun); A7/B7 Individual Sections: 15' (Mon-Fri); 20' (Sat); 25-30' (Sun)		
A7	B7	Kanigos-Kifissia-Nea Kifissia	Trunk	37.9	110	5:00-0:00 (Mon-Sun)		169 (Mon-Fri); 112 (Sat); 81 (Sun)		Common Section: 5' (Mon-Fri); 10' (Sat); 15' (Sun); A7/B7 Individual Sections: 15' (Mon-Fri); 20' (Sat); 25-30' (Sun)		
A7	E7	Kanigos-Kifissia (Express)	Express Trunk		34	5:00-0:00 (Mon-Sun)		169 (Mon-Fri); 112 (Sat); 81 (Sun)		Common Section: 5' (Mon-Fri); 10' (Sat); 15' (Sun); A7/B7 Individual Sections: 15' (Mon-Fri); 20' (Sat); 25-30' (Sun)		
Β7		Listed as part of route Α7 as they shared large common sections.										
A8	A8	Polytechneio-Nea Ionia-Marousi	Trunk	34.2	112	5:00-0:00 (Mon-Sun)		83 (Mon-Fri); 57 (Sat); 36 (Sun)		10-15' (Mon-Fri); 20' (Sat); 30-35' (Sun)		
A8	A8	Polytechneio-Nea Ionia-Marousi	Trunk	34.2	112	5:00-0:00 (Mon-Sun)		116 (Note: 86 as A2 30 as Γ8) (Mon-Fri); 72 (Sat); 56 (Sun)		Common Section: 10' (Mon-Fri); 15' (Sat); 20' (Sun); A8-only Section: 10-15' (Mon-Sat); 20' (Sun); Γ8-only Section: 35' (Mon-Fri)		
A8	Γ8	Polytechneio-Nea Ionia-Irakleio	Trunk	21.3	61	5:00-0:00 (Mon-Sun)		116 (Mon-Fri); 72 (Sat); 56 (Sun)		Common Section: 10' (Mon-Fri); 15' (Sat); 20' (Sun); A8-only Section: 10-15' (Mon-Sat); 20' (Sun); Γ8-only Section: 35' (Mon-Fri)		
B8		Polytechneio-Nea Filadelfeia-Metamorfosi	Trunk	19.2	64	5:00-23:35 (Mon-Sat); 7:05-21:25 (Sun)		44 (Mon-Fri); 37 (Sat); 23 (Sun)		25' (Mon-Fri); 30' (Sat); 40' (Sun)		
B8		Polytechneio-Nea Filadelfeia-Metamorfosi	Trunk	19.2	64	5:00-23:30 (Mon-Sat); 5:30-23:30 (Sun)		61 (Mon-Fri); 54 (Sat); 40 (Sun)		15-20' (Mon-Sat); 25-30' (Sun)		
Γ8		Listed as part of route A8 as they shared large common sections.										
A9		Listed as part of route Β9 as they shared large common sections.										
B9	Β9	Chalkokondyli-Metamorfosi-Nea Kifissia	Trunk	35.8	119	4:50-0:00 (Mon-Sun)		82 (Mon-Fri); 53 (Sat); 36 (Sun)		15' (Mon-Fri); 20' (Sat); 30-35' (Sun)		
B9	Β9	Chalkokondyli-Metamorfosi-Nea Kifissia	Trunk	35.8	119	4:50-0:00 (Mon-Sun)		103 (Note: 59 as Β9 44 as Α9) (Mon-Fri); 77 (Note: 45 as Β9 32 as Α9) (Sat); 69 (Note: 41 as Β9 28 as Α9) (Sun)		Common Section: 10' (Mon-Fri); 15' (Sat-Sun); Β9-only Section: 20' (Mon-Fri); 25-30' (Sat-Sun); Α9-only Section: 20' (Mon-Fri); 25-30' (Sat-Sun)		
B9	A9	Chalkokondyli-Nea Filadelfeia-Metamorfosi	Trunk	23.4		4:50-0:00 (Mon-Sun)		103 (Mon-Fri); 77 (Sat); 69 (Sun)		Common Section: 10' (Mon-Fri); 15' (Sat-Sun); Β9-only Section: 20' (Mon-Fri); 25-30' (Sat-Sun); Α9-only Section: 20' (Mon-Fri); 25-30' (Sat-Sun)		
Γ9		Chalkokondyli-Kokkinos Mylos-Acharnes	Trunk		109	5:00-23:50 (Mon-Sat); 5:15-23:50 (Sun)		74 (Mon-Fri); 58 (Sat); 34 (Sun)		15' (Mon-Fri); 20' (Sat); 30-35' (Sun)		
Γ9		Chalkokondyli-Kokkinos Mylos-Acharnes	Trunk		109	5:00-23:50 (Mon-Sat); 5:15-23:50 (Sun)		90 (Mon-Fri); 68 (Sat); 51 (Sun)		10-15' (Mon-Sat); 20' (Sun)		
A10	A10	Larissa Station-Acharnes	Trunk	29.4	94	5:00-0:00 (Mon-Sun)		119 (Note: 60 as A10 and 59 as B10) (Mon-Fri); 74 (Note: 38 as A10 and 36 as B10) (Sat); 55 (Note: 28 as A10 and 27 as B10) (Sun)		Common Section: 10' (Mon-Fri); 15' (Sat); 20' (Sun); Individual Sections: 20' (Mon-Fri); 30' (Sat); 40' (Sun)		
A10	B10	Larissa Station-Acharnes (via Aristotelous)	Trunk	27.9	86	5:00-0:00 (Mon-Sun)		119 (Mon-Fri); 74 (Sat); 55 (Sun)		Common Section: 10' (Mon-Fri); 15' (Sat); 20' (Sun); Individual Sections: 20' (Mon-Fri); 30' (Sat); 40' (Sun)		
A10	A10	Vathis Sq.-Acharnes	Trunk			5:00-0:00 (Mon-Sat); 5:30-0:00 (Sun)		120 (Note: 59 as A10, 59 as B10 and 2 as 714) (Mon-Fri); 92 (Note: 45 as A10, 45 as B10 and 2 as 714) (Sat); 74 (Note: 35 as A10, 35 as B10 and 4 as 714) (Sun)		Common Section: 10-15' (Mon-Sun); Individual Sections: 20' (Mon-Fri); 25' (Sat); 30-35' (Sun)		
A10	B10	Vathis Sq.-Acharnes (via Aristotelous)	Trunk			5:00-0:00 (Mon-Sat); 5:30-0:00 (Sun)		120 (Mon-Fri); 92 (Sat); 74 (Sun)		Common Section: 10-15' (Mon-Sun); Individual Sections: 20' (Mon-Fri); 25' (Sat); 30-35' (Sun)		
A10	714	Vathis Sq.-Parnitha	Special Western	64.4	112	5:00-0:00 (Mon-Sat); 5:30-0:00 (Sun)		120 (Mon-Fri); 92 (Sat); 74 (Sun)		Common Section: 10-15' (Mon-Sun); Individual Sections: 20' (Mon-Fri); 25' (Sat); 30-35' (Sun)		
Γ10		Listed as part of route 720 as it was its extended variant.										
A11	A11	Vathis Sq.-Ilion-Petroupoli (via Panorama)	Trunk	21.7	65	5:00-0:00 (Mon-Sun)	5:00-0:00 (Mon-Sun)	109 (Note: 55 as A11 and 54 as B11) (Mon-Fri); 75 (Note: 38 as A11 and 37 as B11) (Sat); 51 (Note: 26 as A11 and 25 as B11) (Sun)	172 (Note: 87 as A11 and 85 as B11) (Mon-Fri); 147 (Note: 73 as A11 and 74 as B11) (Sat); 85 (Note: 43 as A11 and 42 as B11) (Sun)	Common Section: 10' (Mon-Fri); 15' (Sat); 20-25' (Sun); Individual Sections: 20' (Mon-Fri); 30' (Sat); 45' (Sun)	Common Section: 5-10' (Mon-Sat); 10-15' (Sun); Individual Sections: 10-15' (Mon-Sat); 25' (Sun)	
A11	B11	Vathis Sq.-Ilion-Petroupoli	Trunk	20.6	61	5:00-0:00 (Mon-Sun)	5:00-0:00 (Mon-Sun)	109 (Mon-Fri); 75 (Sat); 51 (Sun)	172 (Mon-Fri); 147 (Sat); 85 (Sun)	Common Section: 10' (Mon-Fri); 15' (Sat); 20-25' (Sun); Individual Sections: 20' (Mon-Fri); 30' (Sat); 45' (Sun)	Common Section: 5-10' (Mon-Sat); 10-15' (Sun); Individual Sections: 10-15' (Mon-Sat); 25' (Sun)	
B11		Listed as part of route Α11 as they share large common sections.										
A12		Listed as part of route B12 as they shared large common sections.										
B12	B12	Attiki Station-Ano Liosia (Panorama)	Local	27.7	87	5:00-0:00 (Mon-Sun)		110 (Note: 85 as B12 and 25 as 711) (Mon-Fri); 68 (Note: 47 as B12 and 21 as 711) (Sat); 49 (Note: 35 as B12 and 14 as 711) (Sun)		Common Section: 10' (Mon-Fri); 15-20' (Sat); 20-25' (Sun); B12-only Section: 10-15' (Mon-Fri); 25' (Sat); 30-35' (Sun); 711-only Section: 40-45' (Mon-Fri); 50-55' (Sat); 65' (Sun)		
B12	B12	Marni-Ano Liosia	Trunk		74	5:00-0:00 (Mon-Sun)		110 (Mon-Fri); 68 (Sat); 49 (Sun)		Common Section: 10' (Mon-Fri); 15-20' (Sat); 20-25' (Sun); B12-only Section: 10-15' (Mon-Fri); 25' (Sat); 30-35' (Sun); 711-only Section: 40-45' (Mon-Fri); 50-55' (Sat); 65' (Sun)		
B12	711	Attiki Station-Zofria	Local	24.4	75	5:00-0:00 (Mon-Sun)		110 (Mon-Fri); 68 (Sat); 49 (Sun)		Common Section: 10' (Mon-Fri); 15-20' (Sat); 20-25' (Sun); B12-only Section: 10-15' (Mon-Fri); 25' (Sat); 30-35' (Sun); 711-only Section: 40-45' (Mon-Fri); 50-55' (Sat); 65' (Sun)		
B12	A12	Marni-Ano Liosia-Fyli	Trunk	34.4	116	5:00-0:00 (Note: E12: 6:00-21:00 (Mon-Fri)) (Mon-Sun)		209 (Note: 44 as A12, 85 as B12, 37 as E12 and 43 as 713) (Mon-Fri); 143 (Note: 40 as A12, 67 as B12 and 36 as 713) (Sat); 101 (Note: 25 as A12, 49 as B12 and 27 as 713) (Sun)		Common Section: 5-10' (Note: E12: 25' (Mon-Fri)) (Mon-Sun); Α12-only Section: 25-30' (Mon-Sat); 45' (Sun); 713-only Section: 20-25' (Mon-Fri); 30' (Sat); 35' (Sun)		
B12	B12	Marni-Ano Liosia	Trunk		74	5:00-0:00 (Mon-Sun)		209 (Mon-Fri); 143 (Sat); 101 (Sun)		Common Section: 5-10' (Mon-Sun); Α12-only Section: 25-30' (Mon-Sat); 45' (Sun); 713-only Section: 20-25' (Mon-Fri); 30' (Sat); 35' (Sun)		
B12	E12	Marni-Ano Liosia (Express)	Express Trunk		48	5:00-0:00 (Mon-Sun)		209 (Mon-Fri); 143 (Sat); 101 (Sun)		Common Section: 5-10' (Mon-Sun); Α12-only Section: 25-30' (Mon-Sat); 45' (Sun); 713-only Section: 20-25' (Mon-Fri); 30' (Sat); 35' (Sun)		
B12	713	Marni-Zofria	Western		82	5:00-0:00 (Mon-Sun)		209 (Mon-Fri); 143 (Sat); 101 (Sun)		Common Section: 5-10' (Mon-Sun); Α12-only Section: 25-30' (Mon-Sat); 45' (Sun); 713-only Section: 20-25' (Mon-Fri); 30' (Sat); 35' (Sun)		
Γ12		Polytechneio-Ilion-Agios Nikolaos-Kamatero	Trunk	19.4	63	5:00-23:05 (Mon-Sun)		64 (Mon-Fri); 40 (Sat); 33 (Sun)		15-20' (Mon-Fri); 25-30' (Sat); 30-35' (Sun)		
Γ12		Polytechneio-Ilion-Agios Nikolaos-Kamatero	Trunk	19.4	63	5:00-23:40 (Mon-Sun)		74 (Mon-Fri); 64 (Sat); 44 (Sun)		15-20' (Mon-Sat); 25' (Sun)		
A13	A13	Omonoia-Kipoupoli	Trunk	20.4	71	5:00-0:00 (Mon-Sun)		179 (Note: 101 as A13 and 78 as 12) (Mon-Fri); 113 (Note: 64 as A13 and 49 as 12) (Sat); 81 (Note: 48 as A13 and 33 as 12) (Sun)		Common Section: 5-10' (Mon-Sat); 10-15' (Sun); Α13-only Section: 10' (Mon-Fri); 15-20' (Sat); 20-25' (Sun); 12-only Section: 15' (Mon-Fri); 20-25' (Sat); 30-35' (Sun)		
A13	12	Zappeio-Peristeri (Agios Ierotheos)	Trolleybus	18.0	58	5:00-0:00 (Mon-Sun)		179 (Mon-Fri); 113 (Sat); 81 (Sun)		Common Section: 5-10' (Mon-Sat); 10-15' (Sun); Α13-only Section: 10' (Mon-Fri); 15-20' (Sat); 20-25' (Sun); 12-only Section: 15' (Mon-Fri); 20-25' (Sat); 30-35' (Sun)		
A13	A13	Omonoia-Kipoupoli	Trunk	20.4	71	4:25-0:00 (Note: E13: 6:00-20:00) (Mon-Thu); 4:25-2:50 (Note: E13: 6:00-20:00 (Fri)) (Fri-Sat); 4:55-0:40 (Sun)		331 (Note: 123 as A13, 39 as E13 and 169 as 12) (Mon-Thu); 339 (Note: 123 as A13, 39 as E13 and 177 as 12) (Fri); 244 (Note: 101 as A13 and 143 as 12) (Sat); 162 (Note: 72 as A13 and 90 as 12) (Sun)		Common Section: 5-10' (Note: E13: 20' (Mon-Fri)) (Mon-Sun); Α13-only Section: 5-10' (Mon-Sat); 15' (Sun); 12-only Section: 5-10' (Mon-Sat); 10-15' (Sun)		
A13	12	Zappeio-Peristeri (Agios Ierotheos)	Trolleybus	18.0	58	4:25-0:00 (Mon-Thu); 4:25-2:50 (Fri-Sat); 4:55-0:40 (Sun)		331 (Mon-Thu); 339 (Fri); 244 (Sat); 162 (Sun)		Common Section: 5-10' (Mon-Sun); Α13-only Section: 5-10' (Mon-Sat); 15' (Sun); 12-only Section: 5-10' (Mon-Sat); 10-15' (Sun)		
A13	E13	Omonoia-Kipoupoli (Express)	Express Trunk			4:25-0:00 (Mon-Thu); 4:25-2:50 (Fri-Sat); 4:55-0:40 (Sun)		331 (Mon-Thu); 339 (Fri); 244 (Sat); 162 (Sun)		Common Section: 5-10' (Mon-Sun); Α13-only Section: 5-10' (Mon-Sat); 15' (Sun); 12-only Section: 5-10' (Mon-Sat); 10-15' (Sun)		
B13		Omonoia-Anthoupoli-Chrysoupoli	Trunk			5:30-23:00 (Mon-Fri); 5:30-22:35 (Sat-Sun)		70 (Mon-Fri); 58 (Sat); 43 (Sun)		15-20' (Mon-Sat); 25' (Sun)		
A14		Omonoia-Nea Zoi	Trunk			5:25-0:00 (Mon-Fri); 5:30-0:00 (Sat-Sun)		125 (Mon-Fri); 98 (Sat); 70 (Sun)		5-10' (Mon-Sat); 15' (Sun)		
B14		Omonoia-Agios Vasileios	Trunk			5:30-23:00 (Mon-Sun)		62 (Mon-Fri); 52 (Sat); 46 (Sun)		15-20' (Mon-Sat); 25' (Sun)		
A15	A15	Larissa Station-Dasos	Trunk	21.0	60	5:00-0:00 (Mon-Sun)	5:00-0:00 (Mon-Sun)	126 (Note: 110 as A15 and 16 as B15) (Mon-Fri); 84 (Note: 67 as A15 and 17 as B15) (Sat); 62 (Note: 45 as A15 and 17 as B15) (Sun)	186 (Note: 100 as A15 and 86 as B15) (Mon-Fri); 115 (Note: 83 as A15 and 32 as B15) (Sat); 87 (Note: 71 as A15 and 16 as B15) (Sun)	Common Section: 5-10' (Mon-Fri); 10-15' (Sat); 15-20' (Sun); Α15-only Section: 10' (Mon-Fri); 15-20' (Sat); 25' (Sun); B15-only Section: 55-60' (Mon-Fri); 50' (Sat-Sun)	Common Section: 5-10' (Mon-Sat); 10-15' (Sun); Α15-only Section: 10-15' (Mon-Sun); B15-only Section: 10' (Mon-Fri); 25-30' (Sat); 55' (Sun)	
A15	B15	Larissa Station-Palataki	Trunk		37	5:00-0:00 (Mon-Sun)	5:00-0:00 (Mon-Sun)	126 (Mon-Fri); 84 (Sat); 62 (Sun)	186 (Mon-Fri); 115 (Sat); 87 (Sun)	Common Section: 5-10' (Mon-Fri); 10-15' (Sat); 15-20' (Sun); Α15-only Section: 10' (Mon-Fri); 15-20' (Sat); 25' (Sun); B15-only Section: 55-60' (Mon-Fri); 50' (Sat-Sun)	Common Section: 5-10' (Mon-Sat); 10-15' (Sun); Α15-only Section: 10-15' (Mon-Sun); B15-only Section: 10' (Mon-Fri); 25-30' (Sat); 55' (Sun)	
B15		Listed as part of route A15 as they share large common sections.										
A16	A16	Post-2014 route A16 is listed as part of route 876 as it was an extended variant of the specific route.										
A16	A16	Koumoundourou Sq.-Elefsina (via Iera Odos)	Trunk	42.5	95	5:00-0:00 (Mon-Sun)		56 (Note: 34 as A16 and 22 as B16) (Mon-Fri); 34 (Note: 17 as A16 and 17 as B16) (Sat); 26 (Note: 13 as A16 and 13 as B16) (Sun)		Common Section: 20' (Mon-Fri); 30-35' (Sat); 45' (Sun); Α16-only Section: 30' (Mon-Fri); 65' (Sat); 85-90' (Sun); B16-only Section: 50' (Mon-Fri); 65-70' (Sat); 85-90' (Sun)		
A16	B16	Koumoundourou Sq.-Elefsina (via Athinon Ave.)	Trunk	42.9	88	5:00-0:00 (Mon-Sun)		56 (Mon-Fri); 34 (Sat); 26 (Sun)		Common Section: 20' (Mon-Fri); 30-35' (Sat); 45' (Sun); Α16-only Section: 30' (Mon-Fri); 65' (Sat); 85-90' (Sun); B16-only Section: 50' (Mon-Fri); 65-70' (Sat); 85-90' (Sun)		
A16	A16	Koumoundourou Sq.-Elefsina (via Iera Odos)	Trunk	42.5	95	5:00-0:00 (Note: E16: 6:00-20:00 (Mon-Fri)) (Mon-Sun)		85 (Note: 34 as A16, 21 as B16 and 30 as E16) (Mon-Fri); 43 (Note: 21 as A16 and 22 as B16) (Sat); 38 (Note: 19 as A16 and 19 as B16) (Sun)		Common Section: 20' (Note: E16: 25-30') (Mon-Fri); 30-35' (Sat); 45' (Sun); Α16-only Section: 30' (Mon-Fri); 50-55' (Sat); 55-60' (Sun); B16/E16 Section: 20-25' (Note: E16: 25-30') (Mon-Fri); 50-55' (Sat); 60-65' (Sun)		
A16	B16	Koumoundourou Sq.-Elefsina (via Athinon Ave.)	Trunk	42.9	88	5:00-0:00 (Mon-Sun)		85 (Mon-Fri); 43 (Sat); 38 (Sun)		Common Section: 20' (Mon-Fri); 30-35' (Sat); 45' (Sun); Α16-only Section: 30' (Mon-Fri); 50-55' (Sat); 55-60' (Sun); B16/E16 Section: 20-25' (Mon-Fri); 50-55' (Sat); 60-65' (Sun)		
A16	E16	Koumoundourou Sq.-Elefsina (Express)	Express Trunk	42.9	30	5:00-0:00 (Mon-Sun)		85 (Mon-Fri); 43 (Sat); 38 (Sun)		Common Section: 20' (Mon-Fri); 30-35' (Sat); 45' (Sun); Α16-only Section: 30' (Mon-Fri); 50-55' (Sat); 55-60' (Sun); B16/E16 Section: 20-25' (Mon-Fri); 50-55' (Sat); 60-65' (Sun)		
B16		Listed as part of route A16 as they shared large common sections.										
Γ16		Listed as part of route 866 as they shared large common sections.										
Γ16		Koumoundourou Sq.-Aspropyrgos		86	5:05-22:45 (Mon-Sat); 5:30-22:45 (Sun)	36 (Mon-Fri); 27 (Sat); 20 (Sun)	30' (Mon-Fri); 40' (Sat); 55' (Sun)					
A17		Omonoia-Korydallos	Trunk			5:00-0:00 (Mon-Sat); 5:30-0:00 (Sun)	61 (Mon-Fri); 46 (Sat); 35 (Sun)	20' (Mon-Fri); 25' (Sat); 30-35' (Sun)				
B17		Omonoia-Ano Korydallos	Trunk			5:15-23:40 (Mon-Sat); 5:50-23:35 (Sun)	60 (Mon-Fri); 45 (Sat); 34 (Sun)	15-20' (Mon-Fri); 25' (Sat); 30-35' (Sun)				
B18		Omonoia-Perama (via Petrou Ralli)	Trunk		108	5:10-23:20 (Mon-Fri); 5:25-23:20 (Sat); 5:30-23:10 (Sun)	52 (Mon-Fri); 35 (Sat); 26 (Sun)	20' (Mon-Fri); 30' (Sat); 40-45' (Sun)				
Γ18		Omonoia-Perama (via Lambraki)	Trunk		109	5:00-23:45 (Mon-Sun)	52 (Mon-Fri); 37 (Sat); 27 (Sun)	20-25' (Mon-Fri); 30' (Sat); 40-45' (Sun)				

=== Express Routes ===
This list does not contain express trunk routes. These routes are listed in the trunk routes section.

Express Routes
Number	Route Type	Route	Length (in km)	Stops	Operating Hours	Daily Trips	Avg. Frequency
E14	Syntagma-OAKA-Ypourgeio Paideias	Express		39	5:40-22:35 (Mon-Fri)	52 (Mon-Fri)	20' (Mon-Fri)
X14	Syntagma-OAKA	24h Express		24	24 hours (Mon-Sun)	78 (Mon-Fri); 63 (Sat); 60 (Sun)	15-20' (Mon-Fri); 20-25' (Sat-Sun); 25-30' (Nights)
E15	Larissa Station-TEI Athinon	Limited Scholar Express Western		4	7:30-11:00 (Mon-Fri)	15 (Mon-Fri)	15' (Mon-Fri)
E22	Akadimia-Saronida	Express	92.5	120	6:05-23:15 (Mon-Fri); 6:25-22:15 (Sat-Sun)	38 (Mon-Fri); 22 (Sat-Sun)	25-30' (Mon-Fri); 45' (Sat-Sun)
X27	Agios Dimitrios Station-Elliniko	Express		24	5:55-23:40 (Mon-Sat); 8:35-23:40 (Sun)	64 (Mon-Fri); 51 (Sat); 34 (Sun)	15' (Mon-Fri); 20' (Sat); 25-30' (Sun)
X40	OAKA-Acharnes-Olympiako Chorio-Thrakomakedones	Express		65	6:00-22:55 (Mon-Sat); 7:10-22:40 (Sun)	40 (Mon-Fri); 34 (Sat); 20 (Sun)	25' (Mon-Fri); 30' (Sat); 45-50' (Sun)
X41	OAKA-Acharnes-Olympiako Chorio	Express		77	5:00-22:35 (Mon-Sat); 6:00-22:35 (Sun)	42 (Mon-Fri); 35 (Sat); 22 (Sun)	25' (Mon-Fri); 30' (Sat); 45-50' (Sun)
X42	Ano Liosia-Doukissis Plakentias Station	Express	31.2	18	6:00-21:10 (Mon-Fri)	26 (Mon-Fri)	35' (Mon-Fri)
E63	Koumoundourou Sq.-Mandra	Express		90	6:50-20:10 (Mon-Fri)	20 (Mon-Fri)	40-45' (Mon-Fri)
X63	Egaleo Station-Mandra (Oikismos Titan)	Express		99	5:30-21:20 (Mon-Sun)	24 (Mon-Sun)	40' (Mon-Sun)
X80	Syntagma-Akropoli-Piraeus	Summer Express		16	7:00-21:15 (Mon-Sun)	20 (Mon-Fri); 22 (Sat); 26 (Sun)	45' (Mon-Fri); 40' (Sat); 35' (Sun)
E90	Piraeus-Panepistimioupoli	Scholar Express Eastern		37	4 special trips on each direction during weekdays		
X92	Kifissia-Athens International Airport	24h Airport Express	58.2	21	24 hours (Mon-Sun)	26 (Mon-Sun)	50' (Mon-Sun); 85' (Nights)
X93	Kifissos Bus Terminal-Athens International Airport	24h Airport Express	83.5	20	24 hours (Mon-Sun)	42 (Mon-Sun)	30' (Mon-Sun); 45-50' (Nights)
X94	Ethniki Amyna Station-Athens International Airport	Airport Express	51.7	19	7:30-23:30 (Mon-Sun)	80 (Mon-Sun)	10-15' (Mon-Sun)
X95	Syntagma-Athens International Airport	24h Airport Express	62.7	37	24 hours (Mon-Sun)	81 (Mon-Sun)	15' (Mon-Sun); 20-25' (Nights)
X96	Piraeus-Athens International Airport	24h Airport Express	89.1	85	24h (Mon-Sun)	46 (Mon-Sun)	30' (Mon-Sun); 35-40' (Nights)
X97	Elliniko Station-Athens International Airport	24h Airport Express	55.2	29	24 hours (Mon-Sun)	21 (Mon-Sun)	60' (Mon-Sun); 100' (Nights)
X97	Dafni Station-Athens International Airport	24h Airport Express	69.2	36	24 hours (Mon-Sun)	29 (Mon-Sun)	45' (Mon-Sun); 70-75' (Nights)

=== 0XX Routes ===
These routes serve the Athens city centre. Areas that are not part of sector 0 but are or were served by these routes include: Agioi Anargyroi (024), Dafni (057), Haidari (075), Kallithea (040), Nea Ionia (054), Neo Psychiko (036), Peristeri (075), Piraeus (040, 049), Psychiko (036) and Tavros (035, 049)

0XX Routes
Number		Route	Route Type	Length (in km)	Stops	Operating Hours		Daily Trips		Avg. Frequency		Map
021		Kanigos-Gyzi	Central	4.9	21	5:00-23:20 (Mon-Sat); 7:10-22:00 (Sun)		94 (Mon-Fri); 52 (Sat); 33 (Sun)		10-15' (Mon-Fri); 20' (Sat); 25-30' (Sun)		
021		Kanigos-Gyzi	Central	4.9	21	5:15-23:20 (Mon-Sat); 5:45-23:20 (Sun)		106 (Mon-Fri); 86 (Sat); 61 (Sun)		10-15' (Mon-Sat); 15-20' (Sun)		
022		Akadimia-Nea Kypseli	Central	7.7	23	5:15-23:35 (Mon-Sat); 6:30-23:35 (Sun)		98 (Mon-Fri); 52 (Sat); 37 (Sun)		10' (Mon-Fri); 20' (Sat); 25-30' (Sun)		
022		Nea Kypseli-Marasleios	Central	13.0	42	5:15-23:10 (Mon-Sat); 5:30-23:10 (Sun)		82 (Mon-Fri); 52 (Sat); 36 (Sun)		10-15' (Mon-Fri); 20' (Sat); 30' (Sun)		
022		Nea Kypseli-Marasleios	Central	13.0	42	5:15-23:10 (Mon-Sat); 5:30-23:10 (Sun)		90 (Mon-Fri); 52 (Sat); 43 (Sun)		10-15' (Mon-Fri); 20' (Sat); 25' (Sun)		
024		Kato Patisia Station-Agioi Anargyroi	Local	11.2	38	6:00-20:20 (Mon-Sun)		16 (Mon-Sun)		55-60' (Mon-Sun)		
024		Larissa Station-Attiki Station-Agioi Anargyroi	Local	15.5	51	5:00-23:35 (Mon-Sat); 7:00-21:45 (Sun)		49 (Mon-Fri); 40 (Sat); 28 (Sun)		20-25' (Mon-Fri); 25-30' (Sat); 30-35' (Sun)		
024		Agioi Anargyroi-Agios Ioannis Station	Central	28.0	86	5:00-23:35 (Mon-Sat); 5:20-23:35 (Sun)		80 (Mon-Fri); 69 (Sat); 49 (Sun)		15' (Mon-Sat); 20-25' (Sun)		
025	025	Ippokratous-Profitis Daniil	Central	11.4	37	5:00-23:00 (Mon-Sat); 6:30-22:00 (Sun)	5:15-23:00 (Mon-Sun)	91 (Note: After 2022: 45 as 025 and 46 as 026. Before 2022: 45 as 025, 38 as 026 and 8 as 027.) (Mon-Fri); 59 (Note: After 2022: 29 as 025 and 30 as 026. Before 2022: 29 as 025, 24 as 026 and 6 as 027.) (Sat); 38 (Note: 19 as 025 and 19 as 026.) (Sun)	95 (Note: 45 as 025, 38 as 026 and 12 as 027.) (Mon-Fri); 82 (Note: 40 as 025, 33 as 026 and 9 as 027.) (Sat); 67 (Note: 32 as 025 and 35 as 026.) (Sun)	Common Section: 10-15' (Mon-Fri); 15-20' (Sat); 25' (Sun); Individual Sections: 20-25' (Mon-Fri); 35-40' (Sat); 50' (Sun)	Common Section: 10-15' (Mon-Sun); Individual Sections: 20' (Mon-Fri); 25' (Sat); 30' (Sun)	
025	026	Ippokratous-Votanikos	Central	13.0	45	5:00-23:00 (Mon-Sat); 6:30-22:00 (Sun)	5:15-23:00 (Mon-Sun)	91 (Mon-Fri); 59 (Sat); 38 (Sun)	95 (Mon-Fri); 82 (Sat); 67 (Sun)	Common Section: 10-15' (Mon-Fri); 15-20' (Sat); 25' (Sun); Individual Sections: 20-25' (Mon-Fri); 35-40' (Sat); 50' (Sun)	Common Section: 10-15' (Mon-Sun); Individual Sections: 20' (Mon-Fri); 25' (Sat); 30' (Sun)	
025	027	Ippokratous-Orfeos	Special Central	15.0	52	5:00-23:00 (Mon-Sat); 6:30-22:00 (Sun)	5:15-23:00 (Mon-Sun)	91 (Mon-Fri); 59 (Sat); 38 (Sun)	95 (Mon-Fri); 82 (Sat); 67 (Sun)	Common Section: 10-15' (Mon-Fri); 15-20' (Sat); 25' (Sun); Individual Sections: 20-25' (Mon-Fri); 35-40' (Sat); 50' (Sun)	Common Section: 10-15' (Mon-Sun); Individual Sections: 20' (Mon-Fri); 25' (Sat); 30' (Sun)	
026		Listed as part of route 025, as they share large common sections.										
027		Listed as part of route 026, as it was a special variant of the specific route.										
035		Ano Kypseli-Petralona-Tavros	Central	20.0	60	5:00-22:40 (Mon-Sat); 6:00-22:40 (Sun)		78 (Mon-Fri); 48 (Sat); 28 (Sun)		10-15' (Mon-Fri); 20-25' (Sat); 35' (Sun)		
035		Ano Kypseli-Petralona-Tavros	Central	20.0	60	5:40-22:40 (Mon-Sat); 6:00-22:40 (Sun)		78 (Mon-Fri); 57 (Sat); 40 (Sun)		10-15' (Mon-Fri); 15-20' (Sat); 25' (Sun)		
036		Kypseli-Galatsi-Panormou-Katechaki	Intermunicipal Central	16.7	53	5:30-23:00 (Mon-Sat); 7:10-21:10 (Sun)		61 (Mon-Fri); 44 (Sat); 24 (Sun)		15-20' (Mon-Fri); 25' (Sat); 35-40' (Sun)		
036		Kypseli-Galatsi-Panormou-Katechaki	Intermunicipal Central	16.7	53	5:30-22:20 (Mon-Sat); 6:30-22:20 (Sun)		57 (Mon-Fri); 46 (Sat); 36 (Sun)		15-20' (Mon-Fri); 20-25' (Sat); 25-30' (Sun)		
040		Syntagma-Piraeus	24h Western	25.7	75	24h (Mon-Sun)		130 (Mon-Fri); 73 (Sat); 58 (Sun)		10' (Mon-Fri); 15-20' (Sat); 25' (Sun); 30' (Νights)		
040		Syntagma-Piraeus	24h Western	25.7	75	24h (Mon-Sun)		150 (Mon-Fri); 121 (Sat); 87 (Sun)		5-10' (Mon-Sat); 15' (Sun); 20-25' (Νights)		
046		Mouseio-Ellinoroson	Eastern	13.6	47	5:15-23:00 (Mon-Sat); 6:20-21:10 (Sun)		64 (Mon-Fri); 39 (Sat); 26 (Sun)		15' (Mon-Fri); 25-30' (Sat); 35' (Sun)		
046		Mouseio-Ellinoroson	Eastern	13.6	47	5:45-23:00 (Mon-Sun)		62 (Mon-Fri); 50 (Sat); 37 (Sun)		15' (Mon-Fri); 20' (Sat); 25-30' (Sun)		
049	049	Omonoia-Piraeus	Western	22.3	77	5:00-0:00 (Mon-Sun)	5:00-0:00 (Mon-Sun)	97 (Note: 80 as 049 and 17 as 914) (Mon-Fri); 72 (Note: 55 as 049 and 17 as 914) (Sat); 52 (Note: 40 as 049 and 12 as 914) (Sun)	109 (Note: 91 as 049 and 18 as 914) (Mon-Fri); 92 (Note: 78 as 049 and 14 as 914) (Sat); 79 (Note: 61 as 049 and 18 as 914) (Sun)	Common Section: 10' (Mon-Fri); 15' (Sat); 20-25' (Sun); 049-only Section: 10-15' (Mon-Fri); 20' (Sat); 30' (Sun); 914-only Section: 65' (Mon-Sat); 90' (Sun)	Common Section: 10-15' (Mon-Sun); 049-only Section: 10-15' (Mon-Sat); 20' (Sun); 914-only Section: 60' (Sun-Fri); 75' (Sat)	
049	914	Omonoia-Lachanagora-Palaia Kokkinia	Limited Western	21.9	72	5:00-0:00 (Mon-Sun)	5:00-0:00 (Mon-Sun)	97 (Mon-Fri); 72 (Sat); 52 (Sun)	109 (Mon-Fri); 92 (Sat); 79 (Sun)	Common Section: 10' (Mon-Fri); 15' (Sat); 20-25' (Sun); 049-only Section: 10-15' (Mon-Fri); 20' (Sat); 30' (Sun); 914-only Section: 65' (Mon-Sat); 90' (Sun)	Common Section: 10-15' (Mon-Sun); 049-only Section: 10-15' (Mon-Sat); 20' (Sun); 914-only Section: 60' (Sun-Fri); 75' (Sat)	
051		Omonoia-Kifissos Bus Terminal	Central	7.3	25	5:00-0:00 (Mon-Sat); 5:00-0:25 (Sun)		106 (Mon-Thu); 114 (Fri); 91 (Sat-Sun)		10-15' (Mon-Sun)		
051		Omonoia-Kifissos Bus Terminal	Central	7.3	25	5:00-0:00 (Mon-Sun)		122 (Mon-Thu); 143 (Fri); 126 (Sat); 124 (Sun)		5-10' (Mon-Sun)		
052		Eleonas Station-Kifissos Bus Terminal	Express Local	3.6	3	7:00-21:45 (Mon-Sun)		41 (Mon-Fri); 44 (Sat-Sun)		20-25' (Mon-Sun)		
054		Omonoia-Lambrini-Perissos	Northern	16.7	57	5:00-23:00 (Mon-Sat); 6:30-23:00 (Sun)		76 (Mon-Fri); 49 (Sat); 30 (Sun)		15' (Mon-Fri); 20-25' (Sat); 35' (Sun)		
054		Polytechneio-Lambrini-Perissos	Northern	16.0	55	5:00-23:00 (Mon-Sat); 6:30-23:00 (Sun)		76 (Mon-Fri); 49 (Sat); 30 (Sun)		15' (Mon-Fri); 20-25' (Sat); 35' (Sun)		
054		Perissos-Akadimia-Metamorfosi	Eastern	27.0	94	5:00-23:00 (Mon-Sat); 6:00-22:30 (Sun)		48 (Mon-Fri); 36 (Sat); 31 (Sun)		20-25' (Mon-Fri); 30' (Sat); 30-35' (Sun)		
054		Perissos-Akadimia-Metamorfosi	Eastern	27.0	94	5:00-23:00 (Mon-Sat); 5:20-23:00 (Sun)		72 (Mon-Fri); 56 (Sat); 45 (Sun)		15' (Mon-Fri); 20' (Sat); 25' (Sun)		
057		Omonoia-Lofos Skouze	Central	7.3	28	5:15-23:30 (Mon-Sat); 7:45-22:10 (Sun)		55 (Mon-Fri); 46 (Sat); 26 (Sun)		20' (Mon-Fri); 25' (Sat); 35' (Sun)		
057		Lofos Skouze-Dafni Station	Central	20.0	64	5:00-23:30 (Mon-Sat); 5:20-23:30 (Sun)		92 (Mon-Fri); 71 (Sat); 53 (Sun)		10-15' (Mon-Sat); 20' (Sun)		
060		Akadimia-Lykavittos	Central	8.7	30	6:00-21:50 (Mon-Fri); 7:10-21:50 (Sat-Sun)		34 (Mon-Fri); 27 (Sat); 20 (Sun)		25-30' (Mon-Fri); 35' (Sat); 45' (Sun)		
060		Mouseio-Akadimia-Lykavittos	Central	11.6	40	6:30-20:40 (Mon-Sat)		24 (Mon-Fri); 18 (Sat)		35' (Mon-Fri); 50' (Sat)		
060		Mouseio-Akadimia-Lykavittos	Central	11.6	40	6:30-20:40 (Mon-Sun)		29 (Mon-Fri); 28 (Sat); 15 (Sun)		30' (Mon-Sat); 60' (Sun)		
070		Girokomeio-Areios Pagos-Dikastiria Evelpidon	Limited Central	8.7	26	8:30-15:00 (Mon-Fri)		13 (Mon-Fri)		30-35' (Mon-Fri)		
075		Agios Antonios Station-Attiko Nosokomeio-Dasos	Local	20.9	68	5:40-23:30 (Mon-Sat); 6:55-21:00 (Sun)		49 (Mon-Fri); 36 (Sat); 24 (Sun)		20-25' (Mon-Fri); 30' (Sat); 35' (Sun)		
075		Agios Antonios Station-Attiko Nosokomeio-Dasos	Local	20.9	68	5:40-23:30 (Mon-Sat); 6:55-23:30 (Sun)		74 (Mon-Fri); 61 (Sat); 40 (Sun)		15-20' (Mon-Sat); 25' (Sun)		
075		Sepolia Station-Attiko Nosokomeio	Local			5:40-23:30 (Mon-Sat); 6:55-23:30 (Sun)		74 (Mon-Fri); 61 (Sat); 40 (Sun)		15-20' (Mon-Sat); 25' (Sun)		
075		Sepolia Station-Peristeri	Local		21	5:15-23:15 (Mon-Sat)		76 (Mon-Fri); 62 (Sat)		15-20' (Mon-Sat)		

=== 1ΧΧ Routes ===
These routes serve Agios Dimitrios, Alimos, Anavyssos, Elliniko, Glyfada (except Terpsithea), Nea Smyrni, Palaia Fokaia, Palaio Faliro, Saronida, Vari, Varkiza, Voula and Vouliagmeni. Areas that are not part of sector 1 but are served by these routes include Argyroupoli (140, 164, 165), Athens (100, 140), Ilioupoli (140, 155, 164, 165), Kaisariani (140), Koropi (120), Neo Psychiko (140), Psychiko (140), Terpsithea (124, 128, 164, 165), Vyronas (140), Ymittos (140) and Zografou (140).

1XX Routes
Number		Route	Route Type	Length (in km)	Stops	Operating Hours		Daily Trips		Avg. Frequency		Map
100		Koumoundourou Sq.-Kolonaki-Agora	Central	7.2	28	6:30-17:00 (Mon, Wed, Sat); 6:30-21:00 (Tue, Thu, Fri)		31 (Mon, Wed); 42 (Tue, Thu, Fri); 28 (Sat)		20-25' (Mon-Sat)		
100		Koumoundourou Sq.-Akadimia-Agora	Central	5.0	20	6:30-17:00 (Mon, Wed, Sat); 6:30-21:00 (Tue, Thu, Fri)		61 (Mon, Wed); 91 (Tue, Thu, Fri); 58 (Sat)		10' (Mon-Sat)		
101		Alimos-Elliniko	Local	27.0	82	5:30-23:30 (Mon-Fri); 6:40-23:30 (Sat); 7:30-21:00 (Sun)		20 (Mon-Fri); 16 (Sat); 12 (Sun)		55' (Mon-Fri); 65' (Sat-Sun)		
101		Piraeus-Alimos-Elliniko	Southern	40.2	115	5:00-23:40 (Mon-Sat); 7:00-21:40 (Sun)		25 (Mon-Fri); 20 (Sat); 14 (Sun)		45' (Mon-Fri); 55' (Sat); 60-65' (Sun)		
101		Piraeus-Alimos-Elliniko	Southern	40.2	115	5:00-22:50 (Mon-Sun)		33 (Mon-Fri); 20 (Sat); 19 (Sun)		30-35' (Mon-Fri); 55' (Sat); 60' (Sun)		
103		Listed as part of route 141, as it was an extended variant of the specific route.										
106		Syngrou/Fix Station-Agia Varvara	Local	17.8	63	5:20-23:15 (Mon-Fri); 5:05-23:15 (Sat); 5:05-22:50 (Sun)		57 (Mon-Fri); 38 (Sat); 24 (Sun)		20' (Mon-Fri); 30' (Sat); 45' (Sun)		
106		Kolokotroni Sq.-Agia Varvara	Southern	20.8	70	5:35-23:40 (Mon-Sun)		71 (Mon-Fri); 57 (Sat); 42 (Sun)		15' (Mon-Fri); 20' (Sat); 25' (Sun)		
108		Listed as part of route 109, as it was an extended variant of the specific route.										
109	109	Agios Dimitrios Station-Ano Kalamaki	Local	18.9	51	5:20-23:10 (Mon-Sat); 6:20-22:40 (Sun)		55 (Mon-Fri); 51 (Sat); 32 (Sun)		20' (Mon-Sat); 30' (Sun)		
109	108	Akadimia-Ano Kalamaki	Southern	22.1	62	5:00-23:05 (Mon-Sat); 5:30-23:05 (Sun)		98 (Note: 52 as 108 and 46 as 109.) (Mon-Fri); 80 (Note: 45 as 108 and 35 as 109.) (Sat); 52 (Note: All as 108.) (Sun)		Common Section: 10-15' (Mon-Sat); 20' (Sun); 108-only Section: 20' (Sun-Fri); 25' (Sat)		
109	109	Agios Dimitrios Station-Ano Kalamaki	Local		39	5:00-23:05 (Mon-Sat); 5:30-23:05 (Sun)		98 (Mon-Fri); 80 (Sat); 52 (Sun)		Common Section: 10-15' (Mon-Sat); 20' (Sun); 108-only Section: 20' (Sun-Fri); 25' (Sat)		
110		Kolokotroni Sq.-Nea Smyrni-Palaio Faliro	Southern			5:00-0:00 (Mon-Sun)		38 (Mon-Fri); 36 (Sat-Sun)		30-35' (Mon-Sun)		
111		Listed as part of route 112, as it was an extended variant of the specific route.										
112	112	Dafni Station-Agios Dimitrios	Local	10.5	35	5:25-23:25 (Mon-Fri); 5:10-23:25 (Sat); 7:00-21:45 (Sun)		69 (Mon-Fri); 51 (Sat); 24 (Sun)		15' (Mon-Fri); 20' (Sat); 35-40' (Sun)		
112	111	Akadimia-Agios Dimitrios	Southern	18.4	54	5:00-23:10 (Mon-Sat); 5:30-23:10 (Sun)		82 (Note: 41 as 111 and 41 as 112.) (Mon-Fri); 75 (Note: 37 as 111 and 38 as 112.) (Sat); 41 (Note: All as 111.) (Sun)		Common Section: 10-15' (Mon-Sat); 25' (Sun); 111-only Section: 25' (Sun-Fri); 30' (Sat)		
112	112	Dafni Station-Agios Dimitrios	Local	10.5	35	5:00-23:10 (Mon-Sat); 5:30-23:10 (Sun)		82 (Mon-Fri); 75 (Sat); 41 (Sun)		Common Section: 10-15' (Mon-Sat); 25' (Sun); 111-only Section: 25' (Sun-Fri); 30' (Sat)		
113		Agios Dimitrios Station-Alimos	Local	12.5	46	5:30-23:00 (Mon-Sat); 7:45-23:00 (Sun)		48 (Mon-Fri); 41 (Sat); 30 (Sun)		20-25' (Mon-Sat); 30' (Sun)		
114		Glyfada-Kavouri-Vouliagmeni (via Marina)	Local	25.9	54	6:30-19:45 (Mon-Fri); 6:30-20:00 (Sat); 8:00-19:30 (Sun)		13 (Mon-Sat); 8 (Sun)		60' (Mon-Sat); 100' (Sun)		
114		Glyfada-Kavouri-Vouliagmeni (via Marina)	Local	25.9	54	6:25-19:25 (Mon-Sun)		14 (Mon-Sat); 11 (Sun)		60' (Mon-Sat); 75' (Sun)		
115	Current route 115 is listed as part of route 116, as it is an evening variant of the specific route.											
115	115	Glyfada-Vouliagmeni-Varkiza	Local			6:00-20:30 (Mon-Fri); 6:00-20:00 (Sat); 6:00-19:30 (Sun)		15 (Mon-Sat); 13 (Sun)		60' (Mon-Sun)		
116	116	Glyfada-Vari-Kitsi	Local	31.0	75	5:30-0:00 (Note: 115 after 21:45) (Mon-Sat); 7:30-0:00 (Sun)		41 (Note: 4 as 115) (Mon-Fri); 29 (Sat); 24 (Sun)		25' (Mon-Fri); 35-40' (Sat); 40' (Sun)		
116	115	Glyfada-Vouliagmeni-Kitsi	Limited Local	42.7	100	5:30-0:00 (Mon-Sat); 7:30-0:00 (Sun)		41 (Mon-Fri); 29 (Sat); 24 (Sun)		25' (Mon-Fri); 35-40' (Sat); 40' (Sun)		
116	116	Glyfada-Vouliagmeni-Kitsi	Local	42.7	100	6:15-0:00 (Mon-Sun)		37 (Mon-Fri); 36 (Sat-Sun)		30' (Mon-Sun)		
117		Glyfada-Vouliagmeni-Vari	Local	35.7	88	5:25-22:55 (Mon-Sat); 7:00-22:00 (Sun)		38 (Mon-Fri); 27 (Sat); 20 (Sun)		25-30' (Mon-Fri); 40' (Sat); 45-50' (Sun)		
120		Glyfada-Vari-Koropi Station	Local	53.6	127	5:25-20:50 (Mon-Sat); 6:25-20:45 (Sun)		18 (Mon-Sat); 14 (Sun)		45-50' (Mon-Sat); 60' (Sun)		
122		Argyroupoli Station-Saronida	Local	70.6	132	5:30-23:30 (Mon-Fri); 6:25-22:30 (Sat); 7:00-22:15 (Sun)		44 (Mon-Fri); 33 (Sat); 23 (Sun)		25' (Mon-Fri); 30' (Sat); 40' (Sun)		
123		Saronida-Anavyssos-Palaia Fokaia	Local	24.5	49	6:20-19:15 (Mon-Sun)		13 (Mon-Sun)		60' (Mon-Sun)		
123		Saronida-Anavyssos	Local	16.5	24	6:20-19:15 (Mon-Sun)		13 (Mon-Sun)		60' (Mon-Sun)		
124		Argyroupoli Station-Agia Triada-Glyfada	Local	25.5	83	5:00-23:00 (Mon-Sat); 7:30-22:10 (Sun)		42 (Mon-Fri); 33 (Sat); 23 (Sun)		25' (Mon-Fri); 30-35' (Sat); 40' (Sun)		
124		Glyfada-Agia Triada-Agios Tryfonas	Local	19.6	61	5:00-23:30 (Mon-Sat); 8:00-22:35 (Sun)		53 (Mon-Fri); 36 (Sat); 22 (Sun)		20' (Mon-Fri); 30' (Sat); 40' (Sun)		
124		Glyfada-Agia Triada-Agios Tryfonas	Local	19.6	61	5:00-23:30 (Mon-Sun)		60 (Mon-Fri); 44 (Sat); 38 (Sun)		15-20' (Mon-Fri); 25' (Sat); 30' (Sun)		
125		Listed as part of route 308, as it was an extended variant of the specific route.										
126		Syngrou/Fix Station-Palaio Faliro	Local	18.8	69	5:05-23:30 (Mon-Fri); 5:10-23:30 (Sat); 5:15-23:20 (Sun)		58 (Mon-Fri); 38 (Sat); 24 (Sun)		20' (Mon-Fri); 30' (Sat); 45-50' (Sun)		
126		Kolokotroni Sq.-Palaio Faliro	Southern	22.9	83	5:40-23:50 (Mon-Sat); 5:55-23:50 (Sun)		71 (Mon-Fri); 56 (Sat); 42 (Sun)		15' (Mon-Fri); 20' (Sat); 25' (Sun)		
128		Glyfada-Terpsithea	Local	24.5	75	5:20-23:20 (Mon-Sat); 7:15-22:35 (Sun)		36 (Mon-Fri); 27 (Sat); 23 (Sun)		30' (Mon-Fri); 40' (Sat-Sun)		
128		Glyfada-Terpsithea	Local	19.1	57	5:20-22:00 (Mon-Sun)		49 (Mon-Fri); 38 (Sat); 35 (Sun)		20' (Mon-Fri); 25-30' (Sat-Sun)		
129		Glyfada-Aixoni	Local	13.1	36	5:30-0:00 (Mon-Sun)		48 (Mon-Fri); 33 (Sat-Sun)		20-25' (Mon-Fri); 35' (Sat-Sun)		
130		Piraeus-Nea Smyrni	Southern	22.4	59	5:00-23:00 (Mon-Sat); 7:30-21:35 (Sun)		36 (Mon-Fri); 35 (Sat); 22 (Sun)		30' (Mon-Sat); 40' (Sun)		
130		Piraeus-Nea Smyrni	Southern	22.4	59	5:00-23:00 (Mon-Sun)		70 (Mon-Fri); 57 (Sat); 43 (Sun)		15' (Mon-Fri); 20' (Sat); 25' (Sun)		
131		Dafni Station-Agios Dimitrios Depot	Local	7.5	30	5:10-23:35 (Mon-Fri); 5:40-23:35 (Sat); 6:30-23:20 (Sun)		59 (Mon-Fri); 53 (Sat); 30 (Sun)		20' (Mon-Sat); 35' (Sun)		
131		Dafni Station-Agios Dimitrios Depot	Local	7.5	30	5:50-22:30 (Mon-Sat); 6:45-21:45 (Sun)		55 (Mon-Sat); 29 (Sun)		15-20' (Mon-Sat); 30-35' (Sun)		
132		Dafni Local	Limited Local	13.4	36	7:10-20:40 (Mon-Fri); 9:00-15:10 (Sat-Sun)		12 (Mon-Fri); 6 (Sat-Sun)		75' (Mon-Sun)		
134		Listed as part of route 137, as it was a special variant of the specific route.										
135		Listed as part of route 136, as it was a special variant of the specific route.										
136	136	Syngrou/Fix Station-Ano Nea Smyrni	Local	12.0	43	5:20-23:00 (Mon-Sat); 5:50-23:00 (Sun)		53 (Mon-Fri); 37 (Sat); 28 (Sun)		20' (Mon-Fri); 30' (Sat); 35-40' (Sun)		
136	136	Kolokotroni Sq.-Ano Nea Smyrni	Southern	16.1	50	5:45-23:20 (Mon-Sun)		60 (Note: 5 as 135) (Mon-Fri); 48 (Note: 3 as 135) (Sat); 39 (Sun)		15-20' (Mon-Fri); 20-25' (Sat); 25-30' (Sun)		
136	135	Kolokotroni Sq.-Asyrmatos	Special Southern	20.1	67	5:45-23:20 (Mon-Sun)		60 (Mon-Fri); 48 (Sat); 39 (Sun)		15-20' (Mon-Fri); 20-25' (Sat); 25-30' (Sun)		
137	137	Syngrou/Fix Station-Ano Nea Smyrni	Local	12.5	43	5:05-23:20 (Mon-Sat); 5:30-23:20 (Sun)		54 (Mon-Fri); 38 (Sat); 29 (Sun)		20' (Mon-Fri); 30' (Sat); 35-40' (Sun)		
137	137	Kolokotroni Sq.-Ano Nea Smyrni	Southern	16.6	50	5:30-23:40 (Mon-Sun)		61 (Note: 10 as 134) (Mon-Fri); 49 (Note: 4 as 134) (Sat); 40 (Note: 3 as 134) (Sun)		15-20' (Mon-Fri); 20-25' (Sat); 25-30' (Sun)		
137	134	Kolokotroni Sq.-Asyrmatos	Special Southern	20.6	63	5:30-23:40 (Mon-Sun)		61 (Mon-Fri); 49 (Sat); 40 (Sun)		15-20' (Mon-Fri); 20-25' (Sat); 25-30' (Sun)		
140		Polygono-Glyfada	Intermunicipal Southern	55.0	167	6:00-21:30 (Mon-Sat); 6:30-20:30 (Sun)		46 (Mon-Fri); 33 (Sat); 24 (Sun)		20' (Mon-Fri); 30' (Sat); 35' (Sun)		
140		Polygono-Glyfada	Intermunicipal Southern	55.0	167	6:00-21:30 (Mon-Sat); 6:00-20:30 (Sun)		54 (Mon-Fri); 37 (Sat); 31 (Sun)		15-20' (Mon-Fri); 25' (Sat); 30' (Sun)		
141	141	Dafni Station-Kalamaki	Local	10.1	40	5:05-23:50 (Mon-Sat); 5:30-23:50 (Sun)		101 (Mon-Fri); 68 (Sat); 48 (Sun)		10' (Mon-Fri); 15' (Sat); 20-25' (Sun)		
141	103	Akadimia-Kalamaki	Southern	26.9	79	5:00-23:00 (Mon-Sat); 5:30-23:00 (Sun)		108 (Note: 60 as 103 and 48 as 141.) (Mon-Fri); 79 (Note: 45 as 103 and 34 as 141.) (Sat); 54 (Note: All as 103.) (Sun)		Common Section: 10-15' (Mon-Sat); 15-20' (Sun); 103-only Section: 15-20' (Sun-Fri); 25' (Sat)		
141	141	Dafni Station-Kalamaki	Local		64	5:00-23:00 (Mon-Sat); 5:30-23:00 (Sun)		108 (Mon-Fri); 79 (Sat); 54 (Sun)		Common Section: 10-15' (Mon-Sat); 15-20' (Sun); 103-only Section: 15-20' (Sun-Fri); 25' (Sat)		
142		Argyroupoli Station-Kalamaki	Local	7.4	19	6:55-21:15 (Mon-Sat)		25 (Mon-Sat)		35' (Mon-Sat)		
142		Argyroupoli Station-Kalamaki	Local	9.8	23	6:55-21:15 (Mon-Sat)		21 (Mon-Sat)		40-45' (Mon-Sat)		
149	149	Glyfada-Vari-Varkiza	Local	30.1	75	5:35-22:30 (Mon-Sat); 7:00-22:00 (Sun)	5:30-22:30 (Mon-Sun)	37 (Note: 19 as 149 and 18 as 170) (Mon-Fri); 29 (Note: 15 as 149 and 14 as 170)(Sat); 25 (Note: 13 as 149 and 12 as 170)(Sun)	33 (Note: 17 as 149 and 16 as 170) (Mon-Sat); 28 (Note: 16 as 149 and 12 as 170)(Sun)	Loop Total: 25-30' (Mon-Fri); 35-40' (Sat-Sun); Per Direction: 55' (Mon-Fri); 75' (Sat-Sun)	Loop Total: 30' (Mon-Sat); 35-40' (Sat-Sun); Per Direction: 60' (Mon-Sat); 70' (Sun)	
149	170	Glyfada-Varkiza-Vari	Local	28.3	66	5:35-22:30 (Mon-Sat); 7:00-22:00 (Sun)	5:30-22:30 (Mon-Sun)	37 (Mon-Fri); 29(Sat); 25(Sun)	33 (Mon-Sat); 28(Sun)	Loop Total: 25-30' (Mon-Fri); 35-40' (Sat-Sun); Per Direction: 55' (Mon-Fri); 75' (Sat-Sun)	Loop Total: 30' (Mon-Sat); 35-40' (Sat-Sun); Per Direction: 60' (Mon-Sat); 70' (Sun)	
154		Argyroupoli Station-Ano Glyfada-Panorama Voulas	Local	17.2	52	5:00-23:25 (Mon-Sat); 6:45-23:15 (Sun)		66 (Mon-Fri); 45 (Sat); 34 (Sun)		15-20' (Mon-Fri); 25' (Sat); 30' (Sun)		
154		Agios Dimitrios Station-Ano Glyfada-Panorama Voulas	Local	25.5	75	5:50-23:30 (Mon-Sun)		46 (Mon-Fri); 33 (Sat); 32 (Sun)		20-25' (Mon-Fri); 30-35' (Sat-Sun)		
154		Agios Dimitrios Station-Ano Glyfada-Panorama Voulas	Local	25.5	75	5:55-23:30 (Mon-Sun)		56 (Mon-Fri); 47 (Sat); 37 (Sun)		20-25' (Mon-Sat); 30' (Sun)		
155		Agios Dimitrios Station-Elliniko	Local	10.9	34	5:30-0:00 (Mon-Sun)		39 (Note: 1 extended to Agia Marina and 1 extended to Omonoia) (Mon-Fri); 43 (Sat); 32 (Sun)		30' (Mon-Fri); 25' (Sat); 35' (Sun)		
155		Agia Marina-Alimos Station-Elliniko	Local	18.2	63	5:00-0:00 (Mon-Sat); 5:30-0:00 (Sun)		41 (Note: 2 extended to Agios Dimitrios Station and 1 extended to Omonoia) (Mon-Fri); 32 (Note: 21 finishing at Kanaria Sq. and 2 extended to Agios Dimitrios Station) (Sat); 25 (Note: 1 extended to Agios Dimitrios Station) (Sun)		25-30' (Mon-Fri); 35' (Sat); 45' (Sun)		
155		Omonoia-Elliniko (via Vouliagmenis Ave.)	Southern	21.1	60	5:00-0:00 (Mon-Sun)		57 (Mon-Fri); 50 (Sat); 38 (Sun)		20-25' (Mon-Sat); 30' (Sun)		
160		Alimos-Terpsithea	Local		48	5:00-21:55 (Mon-Sat); 5:30-21:50 (Sun)		30 (Mon-Sat); 21 (Sun)		35' (Mon-Sat); 50' (Sun)		
162		Voula-Panorama	Local	11.7	32	7:10-20:25 (Mon-Sat)		22 (Mon-Sat)		35-40' (Mon-Sat)		
162		Voula-Panorama	Local	11.7	32	6:00-20:00 (Mon-Sun)		15 (Mon-Sun)		60' (Mon-Sun)		
163		Voula-Pigadakia	Local	7.1	15	6:30-19:30 (Mon-Sun)		14 (Mon-Sun)		60' (Mon-Sun)		
164		Agios Dimitrios Station-Kato Ilioupoli-Argyroupoli-Terpsithea	Local	16.8	57	5:55-0:00 (Mon-Fri); 5:30-0:00 (Sat-Sun)		65 (Mon-Fri); 42 (Sat); 36 (Sun)		15' (Mon-Fri); 25-30' (Sat); 30' (Sun)		
165		Syntagma-Argyroupoli-Terpsithea	Southern	23.5	72	6:10-20:30 (Mon-Fri)		17 (Mon-Fri)		55' (Mon-Fri)		
170		Listed as part of route 149, as it was its anticlockwise counterpart.										
171		Argyroupoli Station-Varkiza	Local	26.3	71	5:30-22:45 (Mon-Sat); 6:00-22:45 (Sun)		65 (Mon-Fri); 44 (Sat); 34 (Sun)		15' (Mon-Fri); 25' (Sat); 30' (Sun)		
171		Agios Dimitrios Station-Varkiza	Local	34.5	94	5:30-23:00 (Mon-Sat); 6:00-23:00 (Sun)		56 (Mon-Fri); 47 (Sat); 40 (Sun)		20-25' (Mon-Sun)		
172		Alimos Local	Local	8.8	29	7:00-21:30 (Mon-Fri)		25 (Mon-Fri)		35' (Mon-Fri)		

=== 2XX Routes ===
These routes serve Argyroupoli, Dafni, Ilioupoli, Kaisariani, Terpsithea, Vyronas, Ymittos and Zografou. Areas that are not part of sector 2 but are served by these routes include Agios Dimitrios (217, 219, 229), Alimos (248), Athens (200, 202, 209, 210, 224, 227, 230, 231), Elliniko (205, 247, 248), Glyfada (205), Kallithea (218, 219, 232), Moschato (218, 232), Nea Smyrni (218, 219, 232), Palaio Faliro (217, 229) and Piraeus (217, 218, 229)

2XX Routes
Number		Route	Route Type	Length (in km)	Stops	Operating Hours		Daily Trips		Avg. Frequency		Map
200		Mouseio-Agora-Kolonaki	Central	9.4	38	6:30-17:00 (Mon, Wed, Sat); 6:30-20:45 (Tue, Thu, Fri)		54 (Mon, Wed); 87 (Tue, Thu, Fri); 46 (Sat)		10' (Mon-Fri); 15' (Sat)		
201		Agios Dimitrios Station-Argyroupoli	Local	16.5	60	6:30-21:35 (Mon-Fri); 6:55-20:30 (Sat); 7:00-20:05 (Sun)		29 (Mon-Fri); 26 (Sat); 14 (Sun)		30-35' (Mon-Sat); 60' (Sun)		
201		Dafni Station-Argyroupoli	Local	16.9	59	6:30-22:30 (Mon-Fri); 7:00-21:30 (Sat); 6:55-21:05 (Sun)		39 (Mon-Fri); 26 (Sat); 17 (Sun)		25' (Mon-Fri); 35' (Sat); 50-55' (Sun)		
202		Syngrou/Fix Station-Dafni Station	Local	12.6	44	5:00-23:30 (Mon-Sat); 7:45-22:20 (Sun)		64 (Mon-Fri); 41 (Sat); 20 (Sun)		15-20' (Mon-Fri); 25-30' (Sat); 45' (Sun)		
202		Akadimia-Ymittos-Charavgi	Southern	11.7	33	5:00-23:40 (Mon-Sat); 5:30-23:40 (Sun)		89 (Mon-Fri); 66 (Sat); 49 (Sun)		10-15' (Mon-Sat); 20-25' (Sun)		
203	203	Akadimia-Kareas	Eastern	14.7	54	5:10-23:10 (Mon-Sat); 6:30-23:10 (Sun)	5:40-23:40 (Mon-Sun)	78 (Note: 10 as 204B) (Mon-Fri); 57 (Note: 12 as 204B) (Sat); 43 (Note: 12 as 204) (Sun)	82 (Note: 10 as 204) (Mon-Fri); 72 (Note: 11 as 204) (Sat); 57 (Note: 13 as 204) (Sun)	Common Section: 15' (Mon-Fri); 20-25' (Sat-Sun); 203-only Section: 15' (Mon-Fri); 25' (Sat); 30-35' (Sun); 204/204B Section: 80' (Mon-Fri); 60-65' (Sat-Sun)	Common Section: 10-15' (Mon-Sat); 20' (Sun); 203-only Section: 15-20' (Mon-Sat); 25' (Sun); 204/204B Section: 80' (Mon-Fri); 70' (Sat); 60' (Sun)	
203	204	Akadimia-Stratopedo Saketa	Limited Eastern	12.5	44	5:10-23:10 (Mon-Sat); 6:30-23:10 (Sun)	5:40-23:40 (Mon-Sun)	78 (Mon-Fri); 57 (Sat); 43 (Sun)	82 (Mon-Fri); 72 (Sat); 57 (Sun)	Common Section: 15' (Mon-Fri); 20-25' (Sat-Sun); 203-only Section: 15' (Mon-Fri); 25' (Sat); 30-35' (Sun); 204/204B Section: 80' (Mon-Fri); 60-65' (Sat-Sun)	Common Section: 10-15' (Mon-Sat); 20' (Sun); 203-only Section: 15-20' (Mon-Sat); 25' (Sun); 204/204B Section: 80' (Mon-Fri); 70' (Sat); 60' (Sun)	
203	204B	Akadimia-EKEMS	Limited Eastern	13.6	44	5:10-23:10 (Mon-Sat); 6:30-23:10 (Sun)	5:40-23:40 (Mon-Sun)	78 (Mon-Fri); 57 (Sat); 43 (Sun)	82 (Mon-Fri); 72 (Sat); 57 (Sun)	Common Section: 15' (Mon-Fri); 20-25' (Sat-Sun); 203-only Section: 15' (Mon-Fri); 25' (Sat); 30-35' (Sun); 204/204B Section: 80' (Mon-Fri); 60-65' (Sat-Sun)	Common Section: 10-15' (Mon-Sat); 20' (Sun); 203-only Section: 15-20' (Mon-Sat); 25' (Sun); 204/204B Section: 80' (Mon-Fri); 70' (Sat); 60' (Sun)	
204		Listed as part of route 203, as they share large common sections.										
205		Glyfada-Sourmena-Terpsithea	Local	17.2	57	5:35-23:45 (Mon-Sat); 7:40-23:45 (Sun)		45 (Mon-Fri); 34 (Sat); 25 (Sun)		25' (Mon-Fri); 30-35' (Sat); 40' (Sun)		
205		Glyfada-Sourmena-Terpsithea	Local	17.2	50	5:00-23:10 (Mon-Sun)		41 (Mon-Fri); 31 (Sat-Sun)		25-30' (Mon-Fri); 35' (Sat-Sun)		
206		Dafni Station-Agia Marina	Local	8.7	29	5:20-23:35 (Mon-Fri); 5:15-23:35 (Sat); 5:30-23:35 (Sun)		99 (Mon-Fri); 66 (Sat); 44 (Sun)		10' (Mon-Fri); 15' (Sat); 25' (Sun)		
206		Akadimia-Agia Marina	Southern	16.0	45	5:00-23:05 (Mon-Sat); 5:30-23:05 (Sun)		90 (Mon-Fri); 79 (Sat); 60 (Sun)		10-15' (Mon-Sat); 15-20' (Sun)		
207		Glyfada-Terpsithea	Local	15.9	43	5:25-23:10 (Mon-Sat); 7:50-22:35 (Sun)		28 (Mon-Fri); 25 (Sat); 20 (Sun)		40' (Mon-Fri); 45' (Sat-Sun)		
207		Glyfada-Terpsithea	Local	15.9	43	5:15-23:40 (Mon-Sun)		40 (Mon-Fri); 31 (Sat-Sun)		25-30' (Mon-Fri); 35' (Sat-Sun)		
208		Akadimia-Kato Ilioupoli	Southern	17.7	48	5:00-23:05 (Mon-Sun)		82 (Mon-Fri); 70 (Sat); 43 (Sun)		10-15' (Mon-Sat); 25' (Sun)		
209	209	Sytnagma-Metamorfosi-Ymittos	Eastern	10.0	38	5:15-23:00 (Mon-Sat); 6:05-23:00 (Sun)		54 (Mon-Fri); 35 (Sat); 34 (Sun)		20' (Mon-Fri); 30' (Sat-Sun)		
209	209	Syntagma-Metamorfosi	Eastern	10.0	38	5:15-23:00 (Mon-Sat); 6:00-23:00 (Sun)		68 (Mon-Fri); 56 (Sat); 44 (Sun)		15' (Mon-Fri); 20-25' (Sat-Sun)		
209	209	Sytnagma-Metamorfosi	Eastern	10.0	38	5:10-22:10 (Mon-Fri); 5:10-22:40 (Sat); 5:40-22:40 (Sun)		104 (Note: 52 as 209 and 52 as 210) (Mon-Fri); 70 (Note: 35 as 209 and 35 as 210) (Sat); 64 (Note: 32 as 209 and 32 as 210) (Sun)		Common Section: 10' (Mon-Fri); 15' (Sat-Sun); Individual Sections: 20' (Mon-Fri); 30' (Sat-Sun)		
209	210	Sytnagma-Nea Elvetia	Eastern			5:10-22:10 (Mon-Fri); 5:10-22:40 (Sat); 5:40-22:40 (Sun)		104 (Mon-Fri); 70 (Sat); 64 (Sun)		Common Section: 10' (Mon-Fri); 15' (Sat-Sun); Individual Sections: 20' (Mon-Fri); 30' (Sat-Sun)		
210	210	Agios Dimitrios Station-Elliniko-Terpsithea	Local	16.9	57	5:30-23:00 (Mon-Sat); 7:30-22:15 (Sun)		55 (Mon-Fri); 44 (Sat); 30 (Sun)		20' (Mon-Fri); 25' (Sat); 30' (Sun)		
210	Route 210 that existed until 2001 is listed with route 209 as they shared large common sections.											
211		Akadimia-Metamorfosi-Ymittos	Eastern	9.5	36	5:00-23:00 (Mon-Sat); 6:50-23:00 (Sun)		57 (Mon-Fri); 42 (Sat); 33 (Sun)		20' (Mon-Fri); 25' (Sat); 30' (Sun)		
211		Akadimia-Metamorfosi	Eastern	9.5	36	5:00-23:00 (Mon-Sat); 5:20-23:00 (Sun)		58 (Mon-Fri); 60 (Sat); 39 (Sun)		15-20' (Mon-Sat); 25-30' (Sun)		
212	212	Dafni Station-Ymittos-Vyronas-Kareas	Local	15.9	59	5:40-23:30 (Mon-Sat); 8:05-22:20 (Sun)		50 (Mon-Fri); 32 (Sat); 26 (Sun)		20' (Mon-Fri); 35' (Sat-Sun)		
212	212	Dafni Station-Ymittos-Vyronas-Kareas	Local	15.9	59	5:40-23:30 (Mon-Sat); 6:50-23:30 (Sun)		72 (Note: 14 as 213) (Mon-Fri); 64 (Sat); 48 (Note: 16 as 213) (Sun)		Common Section: 15' (Mon-Sat); 20' (Sun); 212-only Section: 15-20' (Mon-Sat); 25-30' (Sun); 213-only Section: 65' (Mon-Sat); 50-55' (Sun)		
212	213	Dafni Station-Ymittos-Nekrotafeio Vyrona	Limited Local	10.3	36	5:40-23:30 (Mon-Sat); 6:50-23:30 (Sun)		72 (Mon-Fri); 64 (Sat); 48 (Sun)		Common Section: 15' (Mon-Sat); 20' (Sun); 212-only Section: 15-20' (Mon-Sat); 25-30' (Sun); 213-only Section: 65' (Mon-Sat); 50-55' (Sun)		
213		Listed as part of route 212 as they shared multiple common sections.										
214		Akadimia-Zoodochos Pigi	Eastern	11.5	42	5:00-23:20 (Mon-Sun)		98 (Mon-Fri); 67 (Sat); 49 (Sun)		10' (Mon-Fri); 15' (Sat); 20-25' (Sun)		
214		Akadimia-Zoodochos Pigi	Eastern	11.5	42	5:00-23:40 (Mon-Sun)		127 (Mon-Fri); 106 (Sat); 77 (Sun)		5-10' (Mon-Sat); 15' (Sun)		
216		Agios Dimitrios Station-Agia Marina	Local	10.7	40	5:40-22:55 (Mon-Fri)		45 (Mon-Fri)		20-25' (Mon-Fri)		
216		Agios Dimitrios Station-Agia Marina	Local	10.7	40	5:40-23:00 (Mon-Fri)		58 (Mon-Fri)		15-20' (Mon-Fri)		
217	217	Piraeus-Agios Dimitrios-Dafni Station	Southern	33.3	96	5:00-23:15 (Mon-Sat); 6:40-22:35 (Sun)	5:00-23:15 (Mon-Sun)	58 (Mon-Fri) (Note: 29 as 217 and 29 as 229); 51 (Sat) (Note: 25 as 217 and 26 as 229); 32 (Sun) (Note: 16 as 217 and 16 as 229)	84 (Mon-Fri) (Note: 42 as 217 and 42 as 229); 66 (Sat) (Note: 33 as 217 and 33 as 229); 50 (Sun) (Note: 25 as 217 and 25 as 229)	Common Section: 20' (Mon-Sat); 30' (Sun); Individual Sections: 35-40' (Mon-Fri); 40-45' (Sat); 60-65' (Sun)	Common Section: 10-15' (Mon-Sat); 20-25' (Sun); Individual Sections: 25' (Mon-Fri); 30-35' (Sat); 45' (Sun)	
217	229	Piraeus-Agios Dimitrios-Dafni Station	Southern	30.2	91	5:00-23:15 (Mon-Sat); 6:40-22:35 (Sun)	5:00-23:15 (Mon-Sun)	58 (Mon-Fri); 51 (Sat); 32 (Sun)	84 (Mon-Fri); 66 (Sat); 50 (Sun)	Common Section: 20' (Mon-Sat); 30' (Sun); Individual Sections: 35-40' (Mon-Fri); 40-45' (Sat); 60-65' (Sun)	Common Section: 10-15' (Mon-Sat); 20-25' (Sun); Individual Sections: 25' (Mon-Fri); 30-35' (Sat); 45' (Sun)	
218	218	Piraeus-Dafni Station	Southern	26.3	85	5:00-23:45 (Mon-Sun)		66 (Mon-Fri); 39 (Sat); 33 (Sun)		15-20' (Mon-Fri); 30' (Sat); 35' (Sun)		
218	218	Piraeus-Ymittos-Ilioupoli	Southern	36.5	116	5:00-23:40 (Mon-Sun)	5:00-23:40 (Mon-Sun)	69 (Note: 11 as 232) (Mon-Fri); 50 (Note: 9 as 232) (Sat); 41 (Note: 8 as 232) (Sun)	91 (Note: 17 as 232) (Mon-Fri); 72 (Sat); 57 (Note: 15 as 232) (Sun)	Common Section: 15' (Mon-Fri); 20-25' (Sat); 25-30' (Sun); 218-only Section: 20' (Mon-Fri); 25-30' (Sat); 35' (Sun); 232-only Section: 90' (Mon-Fri); 110' (Sat); 120' (Sun)	Common Section: 10-15' (Mon-Sat); 20' (Sun); 218-only Section: 15' (Mon-Fri); 20' (Sat); 25-30' (Sun); 232-only Section: 55-60' (Mon-Sat); 65' (Sun)	
218	232	Piraeus-Ymittos-Vyronas	Limited Southern		121	5:00-23:40 (Mon-Sun)	5:00-23:40 (Mon-Sun)	69 (Mon-Fri); 50 (Sat); 41 (Sun)	91 (Mon-Fri); 72 (Sat); 57 (Sun)	Common Section: 15' (Mon-Fri); 20-25' (Sat); 25-30' (Sun); 218-only Section: 20' (Mon-Fri); 25-30' (Sat); 35' (Sun); 232-only Section: 90' (Mon-Fri); 110' (Sat); 120' (Sun)	Common Section: 10-15' (Mon-Sat); 20' (Sun); 218-only Section: 15' (Mon-Fri); 20' (Sat); 25-30' (Sun); 232-only Section: 55-60' (Mon-Sat); 65' (Sun)	
219	219	Kallithea Station-Agios Dimitrios	Southern	19.2	67	5:30-23:35 (Mon-Sat); 7:05-23:35 (Sun)	5:30-23:30 (Mon-Sun)	76 (Note: 2 as 816.) (Mon-Fri); 45 (Sat); 34 (Sun)	103 (Note: 6 as 816.) (Mon-Fri); 74 (Sat); 56 (Sun)	15' (Mon-Fri); 25' (Sat); 30' (Sun)	10' (Mon-Fri); 15' (Sat); 20' (Sun)	
219	816	Tavros-Agios Dimitrios	Special Southern	21.9	73	5:30-23:35 (Mon-Sat); 7:05-23:35 (Sun)	5:30-23:30 (Mon-Sun)	76 (Mon-Fri); 45 (Sat); 34 (Sun)	103 (Mon-Fri); 74 (Sat); 56 (Sun)	15' (Mon-Fri); 25' (Sat); 30' (Sun)	10' (Mon-Fri); 15' (Sat); 20' (Sun)	
220	220	Akadimia-Ano Ilissia	Eastern	10.0	32	5:00-23:15 (Sun-Fri); 24h (Sat)	5:00-23:15 (Mon-Sun)	123 (Note: 81 as 220 and 42 as 221) (Mon-Fri); 103 (Note: 57 as 220 and 46 as 221) (Sat); 62 (Note: 38 as 220 and 24 as 221) (Sun)	162 (Note: 106 as 220 and 56 as 221) (Mon-Fri); 118 (Note: 74 as 220 and 44 as 221) (Sat); 80 (Note: 53 as 220 and 27 as 221) (Sun)	Common Sections; 5-10' (Mon-Sat); 15-20' (Sun); 30' (Night); 220-only Section; 10' (Mon-Fri); 15' (Sat); 20' (Sun); 221-only Section; 25-30' (Mon-Sat); 45' (Sun)	Common Sections; 5' (Mon-Fri); 10-15' (Sat-Sun); 220-only Section; 10-15' (Mon-Fri); 20' (Sat); 30' (Sun); 221-only Section; 15-20' (Mon-Fri); 25' (Sat); 40' (Sun); 30' (Night)	
220	221	Akadimia-Panepistimioupoli	24h Eastern (Note: 24 hour service only on Saturdays)	10.4	30	5:00-23:15 (Sun-Fri); 24h (Sat)	5:00-23:15 (Mon-Sun)	123 (Mon-Fri); 103 (Sat); 62 (Sun)	162 (Mon-Fri); 118 (Sat); 80 (Sun)	Common Sections; 5-10' (Mon-Sat); 15-20' (Sun); 30' (Night); 220-only Section; 10' (Mon-Fri); 15' (Sat); 20' (Sun); 221-only Section; 25-30' (Mon-Sat); 45' (Sun)	Common Sections; 5' (Mon-Fri); 10-15' (Sat-Sun); 220-only Section; 10-15' (Mon-Fri); 20' (Sat); 30' (Sun); 221-only Section; 15-20' (Mon-Fri); 25' (Sat); 40' (Sun); 30' (Night)	
220	225	Evangelismos Station-Ano Ilissia	Local	7.2	25	5:00-23:15 (Sun-Fri); 24h (Sat)	5:00-23:15 (Mon-Sun)	123 (Mon-Fri); 103 (Sat); 62 (Sun)	162 (Mon-Fri); 118 (Sat); 80 (Sun)	Common Sections; 5-10' (Mon-Sat); 15-20' (Sun); 30' (Night); 220-only Section; 10' (Mon-Fri); 15' (Sat); 20' (Sun); 221-only Section; 25-30' (Mon-Sat); 45' (Sun)	Common Sections; 5' (Mon-Fri); 10-15' (Sat-Sun); 220-only Section; 10-15' (Mon-Fri); 20' (Sat); 30' (Sun); 221-only Section; 15-20' (Mon-Fri); 25' (Sat); 40' (Sun); 30' (Night)	
221		Listed along with route 220 as they share large common sections.										
222		Akadimia-Nekr. Zografou	Eastern	10.5	32							
223		Listed along with route 224 as it was a localised version of the specific route.										
224	224	El. Venizelou-Kaisariani	24h Central	19.4	66	5:00-23:40 (Mon-Fri); 24h (Sat); 5:20-23:40 (Sun)		90 (Mon-Fri); 64 (Sat); 43 (Sun)		10-15' (Mon-Fri); 20' (Sat); 25' (Sun); 40' (Night)		
224	224	El. Venizelou-Kaisariani	Central	19.4	66	5:00-23:40 (Mon-Sat); 5:20-23:40 (Sun)		134 (Note: 33 as 223) (Mon-Fri); 86 (Sat); 63 (Sun)		Common Sections; 5-10' (Mon-Fri); 10-15' (Sat); 15-20' (Sun); 224-only Section; 10-15' (Mon-Sat); 15-20' (Sun)		
224	223	Kanigos-Kaisariani	Eastern	10.8	36	5:00-23:40 (Mon-Sat); 5:20-23:40 (Sun)		134 (Mon-Fri); 86 (Sat); 63 (Sun)		Common Sections; 5-10' (Mon-Fri); 10-15' (Sat); 15-20' (Sun); 224-only Section; 10-15' (Mon-Sat); 15-20' (Sun)		
225		Listed along with route 220 as it was a localised version of the specific route.										
227		Ano Petralona-Agios Artemios	Central	20.0	62	5:00-23:10 (Mon-Sat); 7:00-21:50 (Sun)		66 (Mon-Fri); 41 (Sat); 29 (Sun)		15' (Mon-Fri); 25-30' (Sat); 30' (Sun)		
227		Ano Petralona-Agios Artemios	Central	20.0	62	5:00-23:10 (Mon-Sun)		85 (Mon-Fri); 62 (Sat); 49 (Sun)		10-15' (Mon-Fri); 15-20' (Sat); 20-25' (Sun)		
227		Akadimia-Agios Artemios	Central	9.3	18	5:00-23:00 (Mon-Fri); 5:00-23:30 (Sat); 5:30-23:30 (Sun)		74 (Mon-Fri); 61 (Sat); 42 (Sun)		15-20' (Mon-Sat); 25' (Sun)		
229		Listed along with route 217 as they share large common sections.										
230	230	Akropoli-Zografou	Eastern	18.5	57	5:35-23:10 (Mon-Sat); 7:15-21:05 (Sun)		75 (Mon-Fri); 46 (Sat); 27 (Sun)		15' (Mon-Fri); 20-25' (Sat); 30' (Sun)		
230	230	Akropoli-Zografou	Eastern	18.5	57	5:00-23:30 (Mon-Sun)		74 (Mon-Fri); 58 (Sat); 45 (Sun)		15-20' (Mon-Sat); 25' (Sun)		
230	230	Koumoundourou Sq.-Alexandras Ave.-Goudi	Eastern	16.0	43	5:00-23:20 (Mon-Sun)		78 (Note: 51 as 230 and 27 as 231) (Mon-Fri); 62 (Note: 44 as 230 and 18 as 231) (Sat); 50 (Note: 33 as 230 and 17 as 231) (Sun)		Common Sections; 10-15' (Mon-Fri); 15-20' (Sat-Sun); 230-only Section; 20' (Mon-Fri); 25' (Sat); 30-35' (Sun); 231-only Section; 35-40' (Mon-Fri); 55-60' (Sat-Sun)		
230	231	Koumoundourou Sq.-Michalakopoulou-Goudi	Eastern	14.1	38	5:00-23:20 (Mon-Sun)		78 (Mon-Fri); 62 (Sat); 50 (Sun)		Common Sections; 10-15' (Mon-Fri); 15-20' (Sat-Sun); 230-only Section; 20' (Mon-Fri); 25' (Sat); 30-35' (Sun); 231-only Section; 35-40' (Mon-Fri); 55-60' (Sat-Sun)		
231		Listed along with route 230 as they shared large common sections.										
232		Listed along with route 218 as they shared large common sections.										
235		Akadimia-Zografou	Eastern	10.2	31	5:05-23:25 (Mon-Sat); 5:55-23:00 (Sun)		82 (Mon-Fri); 55 (Sat); 34 (Sun)		10-15' (Mon-Fri); 20' (Sat); 30' (Sun)		
235		Akadimia-Zografou	Eastern	10.2	31	5:30-23:50 (Mon-Sat); 5:50-23:45 (Sun)		115 (Mon-Fri); 87 (Sat); 65 (Sun)		10-15' (Mon-Sun)		
237		Dafni Station-Ano Ilioupoli	Local	13.3	46	5:20-23:45 (Mon-Fri); 5:05-23:45 (Sat); 5:30-23:45 (Sun)		97 (Mon-Fri); 61 (Sat); 37 (Sun)		10' (Mon-Fri); 15-20' (Sat); 30' (Sun)		
237		Akadimia-Ano Ilioupoli	Southern	20.9	62	5:00-23:05 (Mon-Sun)		105 (Mon-Fri); 87 (Sat); 60 (Sun)		10-15' (Mon-Sat); 15-20' (Sun)		
242		Katechaki Station-Polytechneioupoli	Scholar Eastern	7.5	19	7:00-21:35 (Mon-Fri)		89 (Mon-Fri)		10' (Mon)-(Fri)		
242		Katechaki Station-Polytechneioupoli	Scholar Eastern	7.5	19	7:00-21:00 (Mon-Fri)		79 (Mon-Fri)		10' (Mon-Fri)		
245		Neos Kosmos-Polytechneioupoli	Scholar Eastern	18.0	55	7:25-21:50 (Mon-Thu); 7:25-18:40 (Fri)		20 (Mon-Thu); 16 (Fri)		45' (Mon-Fri)		
247		Agios Dimitrios Station-Elliniko (via Alimou Ave.)	Local		39	6:45-20:45 (Mon-Sat)		17 (Mon-Sat)		50-55' (Mon-Sat)		
247		Agios Dimitrios Station-Elliniko (via Alimou Ave.)	Local		39	5:30-23:15 (Mon-Sat); 8:10-23:15 (Sun)		48 (Mon-Fri); 45 (Sat); 34 (Sun)		20-25' (Mon-Sat); 25-30' (Sun)		
248		Agios Dimitrios Station-Argyroupoli-Sourmena	Local		47	5:30-23:05 (Mon-Fri); 5:30-22:20 (Sat); 7:45-22:20 (Sun)		47 (Mon-Fri); 32 (Sat); 26 (Sun)		20-25' (Mon-Fri); 30-35' (Sat-Sun)		
250		Evangelismos Station-Panepistimioupoli	Scholar Eastern	8.8	25	7:40-21:25 (Mon-Fri)		92 (Mon-Fri)		10' (Mon-Fri)		
250		Evangelismos Station-Panepistimioupoli	Scholar Eastern	8.8	25	7:20-21:20 (Mon-Fri)		73 (Mon-Fri)		10' (Mon-Fri)		
251		Katechaki Station-Panepistimioupoli	Scholar Eastern	14.6	17	6:30-20:40 (Mon-Fri)		28 (Mon-Fri)		30' (Mon-Fri)		

=== 3XX Routes ===
These routes serve Anthousa, Artemis, Gerakas, Glyka Nera, Grammatiko, Kalyvia Thorikou, Keratea, Koropi, Kouvaras, Lavrio, Marathonas, Markopoulo, Nea Makri, Pallini, Paiania, Pikermi, Rafina and Spata. Areas that are not part of sector 3 but are served by these routes include Penteli (301) and Piraeus (300).

3XX Routes
Number		Route	Route Type	Length (in km)	Stops	Operating Hours	Daily Trips	Avg. Frequency	Map
300		Karaiskaki Sq.-Tzaneio	Central	5.2	15	6:30-20:10 (Mon-Fri); 6:45-20:10 (Sat-Sun)	37 (Mon-Fri); 32 (Sat); 27 (Sun)	20-25' (Mon-Fri); 25' (Sat); 30' (Sun)	
300		Karaiskaki Sq.-Tzaneio	Central	5.2	15	6:30-20:10 (Mon-Sun)	68 (Mon-Fri); 53 (Sat); 46 (Sun)	10-15' (Mon-Sat); 15-20' (Sun)	
301	301	Doukissis Plakentias Station-Anthousa-Penteli	Local	28.1	80	5:25-23:00 (Mon-Fri); 5:50-23:00 (Sat); 8:25-22:00 (Sun)	25 (Note: 5 as 301B) (Mon-Fri); 22 (Sat); 12 (Sun)	40-45' (Mon-Fri); 50' (Sat); 75' (Sun)	
301	301B	Doukissis Plakentias Station-Anthousa-Penteli (Drafi)	Special Local	35.0	92	5:25-23:00 (Mon-Fri); 5:50-23:00 (Sat); 8:25-22:00 (Sun)	25 (Mon-Fri); 22 (Sat); 12 (Sun)	40-45' (Mon-Fri); 50' (Sat); 75' (Sun)	
301	301	Anthousa Local	Local	9.4	38	5:00-23:40 (Mon-Fri); 6:30-21:50 (Sat-Sun)	37 (Mon-Fri); 23 (Sat-Sun)	30' (Mon-Fri); 40' (Sat-Sun)	
301	301	Anthousa Local	Local	9.4	38	5:00-23:40 (Mon-Fri); 6:35-22:05 (Sat-Sun)	56 (Mon-Fri); 27 (Sat-Sun)	20' (Mon-Fri); 35' (Sat-Sun)	
301	301	Ethniki Amyna Station-Gerakas-Anthousa	Local			5:00-23:40 (Mon-Sun)	49 (Mon-Fri); 37 (Sat-Sun)	20-25' (Mon-Fri); 30' (Sat-Sun)	
302		Doukissis Plakentias Station-Gerakas	Local	15.2	48	5:00-23:05 (Mon-Sat); 7:10-21:35 (Sun)	54 (Mon-Fri); 35 (Sat); 19 (Sun)	20' (Mon-Fri); 30' (Sat); 45-50' (Sun)	
302		Doukissis Plakentias Station-Gerakas	Local		31	5:20-23:35 (Mon-Sat); 8:10-23:35 (Sun)	62 (Mon-Fri); 45 (Sat); 27 (Sun)	15-20' (Mon-Fri); 25' (Sat); 35' (Sun)	
302		Gerakas Local	Local		27	5:20-23:30 (Mon-Sat); 8:20-23:30 (Sun)	70 (Mon-Fri); 51 (Sat); 30 (Sun)	15' (Mon-Fri); 20' (Sat); 30' (Sun)	
302		Ethniki Amyna Station-Gerakas	Local			5:20-23:30 (Mon-Sat); 8:20-23:30 (Sun)	70 (Mon-Fri); 51 (Sat); 30 (Sun)	15' (Mon-Fri); 20' (Sat); 30' (Sun)	
303		Nomismatokopio Station-Gerakas (via Ag. Nektariou)	Local		59	5:40-23:45 (Mon-Sat); 7:55-22:05 (Sun)	31 (Mon-Fri); 27 (Sat); 18 (Sun)	35' (Mon-Fri); 40' (Sat); 50' (Sun)	
303		Ethniki Amyna Station-Gerakas (via Ag. Nektariou)	Local			5:45-23:40 (Mon-Sun)	46 (Mon-Fri); 42 (Sat); 36 (Sun)	20-25' (Mon-Sat); 30' (Sun)	
304	304	Nomismatokopio Station-Artemis (Vravrona)	Local	53.8	148	5:00-23:55 (Note: 316 after 23:00) (Mon-Sun)	81 (Note: 33 as 304 32 as 305 14 as 326 2 as 316) (Mon-Fri); 73 (Note: 30 as 304 29 as 305 12 as 326 2 as 316) (Sat); 63 (Note: 25 as 304 24 as 305 12 as 326 2 as 316) (Sun)	Common Section; 10-15' (Mon-Sat); 15-20' (Sun); 304-only Section; 30' (Mon-Fri); 35' (Sat); 40' (Sun); 305-only Section; 30' (Mon-Fri); 35' (Sat); 40' (Sun); 326-only Section; 60' (Mon-Fri); 75' (Sat-Sun)	
304	305	Nomismatokopio Station-Artemis (Ag. Nikolaos)	Local	50.2	139	5:00-23:55 (Mon-Sun)	81 (Mon-Fri); 73 (Sat); 63 (Sun)	Common Section; 10-15' (Mon-Sat); 15-20' (Sun); 304-only Section; 30' (Mon-Fri); 35' (Sat); 40' (Sun); 305-only Section; 30' (Mon-Fri); 35' (Sat); 40' (Sun); 326-only Section; 60' (Mon-Fri); 75' (Sat-Sun)	
304	316	Nomismatokopio Station-Artemis	Limited Local	60.5	165	5:00-23:55 (Mon-Sun)	81 (Mon-Fri); 73 (Sat); 63 (Sun)	Common Section; 10-15' (Mon-Sat); 15-20' (Sun); 304-only Section; 30' (Mon-Fri); 35' (Sat); 40' (Sun); 305-only Section; 30' (Mon-Fri); 35' (Sat); 40' (Sun); 326-only Section; 60' (Mon-Fri); 75' (Sat-Sun)	
304	326	Kantza Station-Spata-Artemis	Limited Local	33.1	81	5:00-23:55 (Mon-Sun)	81 (Mon-Fri); 73 (Sat); 63 (Sun)	Common Section; 10-15' (Mon-Sat); 15-20' (Sun); 304-only Section; 30' (Mon-Fri); 35' (Sat); 40' (Sun); 305-only Section; 30' (Mon-Fri); 35' (Sat); 40' (Sun); 326-only Section; 60' (Mon-Fri); 75' (Sat-Sun)	
304	304	Ethniki Amyna Station-Artemis (Vravrona)	Local			5:00-23:55 (Note: 316 after 22:00) (Mon-Sun)	68 (Note: 32 as 304 32 as 305 4 as 316) (Mon-Sat); 54 (Note: 25 as 304 25 as 305 4 as 316) (Sun)	Common Section; 15' (Mon-Sat); 20' (Sun); Individual Sections; 30' (Mon-Sat); 40' (Sun)	
304	305	Ethniki Amyna Station-Artemis (Ag. Nikolaos)	Local			5:00-23:55 (Mon-Sun)	68 (Mon-Sat); 54 (Sun)	Common Section; 15' (Mon-Sat); 20' (Sun); Individual Sections; 30' (Mon-Sat); 40' (Sun)	
304	316	Ethniki Amyna Station-Artemis	Limited Local			5:00-23:55 (Mon-Sun)	68 (Mon-Sat); 54 (Sun)	Common Section; 15' (Mon-Sat); 20' (Sun); Individual Sections; 30' (Mon-Sat); 40' (Sun)	
304	321	Doukissis Plakentias Station-Artemis	Local						
305		Listed as part of route 304, as they share large common sections.							
306		Doukissis Plakentias Station-Dimarcheio Geraka-Balana	Local		54	6:10-21:40 (Mon-Sat); 7:30-21:00 (Sun)	28 (Mon-Sat); 14 (Sun)	35' (Mon-Sat); 60-65' (Sun)	
306		Doukissis Plakentias Station-Kantza-Anthousa	Local		111	6:10-23:00 (Mon-Fri); 6:50-22:10 (Sat); 8:05-22:10 (Sun)	29 (Mon-Fri); 24 (Sat); 17 (Sun)	35' (Mon-Fri); 40' (Sat); 50-55' (Sun)	
306		Doukissis Plakentias Station-Gargittos-Gerakas	Local		44	5:40-22:30 (Mon-Sat); 7:15-22:30 (Sun)	29 (Mon-Fri); 20 (Sat); 17 (Sun)	35' (Mon-Fri); 50' (Sat); 55-60' (Sun)	
306		Doukissis Plakentias Station-Gargittos-Gerakas	Local		44	6:10-23:15 (Mon-Sat); 8:20-23:15 (Sun)	48 (Mon-Fri); 42 (Sat); 28 (Sun)	20' (Mon-Fri); 25' (Sat); 30-35' (Sun)	
307		Doukissis Plakentias Station-Glyka Nera-Koropi Station	Local	44.8	92	5:40-23:30 (Mon-Fri); 6:15-23:35 (Sat); 7:55-22:00 (Sun)	33 (Mon-Fri); 25 (Sat); 16 (Sun)	30-35' (Mon-Fri); 40-45' (Sat); 55' (Sun)	
307		Doukissis Plakentias Station-Glyka Nera-SEA Attikis Odou	Local		60	5:35-23:30 (Mon-Sat); 8:50-23:30 (Sun)	42 (Mon-Fri); 38 (Sat); 22 (Sun)	25' (Mon-Fri); 30' (Sat); 40' (Sun)	
308	308	Nomismatokopio Station-Paiania-Koropi	Local	37.9	107	5:35-23:40 (Mon-Fri); 5:40-23:40 (Sat-Sun)	52 (Mon-Fri); 49 (Sat); 35 (Sun)	20-25' (Mon-Sat); 30' (Sun)	
308	308	Nomismatokopio Station-Paiania-Koropi	Local	37.9	107	5:00-0:00 (Mon-Sun)	66 (Note: 5 as 125) (Mon-Fri); 48 (Note: 4 as 125) (Sat); 40 (Sun)	15' (Mon-Fri); 20-25' (Sat); 25-30' (Sun)	
308	125	Nomismatokopio Station-Paiania-Varkiza	Special Local	62.0	168	5:00-0:00 (Mon-Sun)	66 (Mon-Fri); 48 (Sat); 40 (Sun)	15' (Mon-Fri); 20-25' (Sat); 25-30' (Sun)	
308	308	Ethniki Amyna Station-Paiania-Koropi	Local			5:00-0:00 (Mon-Sun)	81 (Note: 10 as 125) (Mon-Fri); 65 (Note: 6 as 125) (Sat); 50 (Sun)	10-15' (Mon-Sat); 20-25' (Sun)	
308	125	Ethniki Amyna Station-Paiania-Varkiza	Special Local			5:00-0:00 (Mon-Sun)	81 (Mon-Fri); 65 (Sat); 50 (Sun)	10-15' (Mon-Sat); 20-25' (Sun)	
309	309	Koropi Station-Koropi	Local	12.4	35	5:25-23:20 (Mon-Sat); 7:20-21:50 (Sun)	35 (Mon-Sat); 28 (Sun)	30-35' (Mon-Sun)	
309	309Β	Koropi Station-Markopoulo-Porto Rafti-Avlaki	Local	43.1	77	6:05-21:05 (Mon-Sat); 7:20-21:05 (Sun)	20 (Mon-Fri); 13 (Sat); 12 (Sun)	45-50' (Mon-Fri); 75' (Sat-Sun)	
309	309Β	Koropi Station-Markopoulo	Local	19.1	40	5:40-21:05 (Mon-Sat)	18 (Mon-Sat)	55' (Mon-Sun)	
309	309	Koropi Station-Athens International Airport	Local	16.4	9				
310	310	Rafina-Mati-Nea Makri-Marathonas	Limited Local	41.4	81	6:00-21:50 (Mon-Sat); 7:10-21:45 (Sun)	15 (Note: 3 as 310Β 4 as 310Γ) (Mon-Sat); 9 (Note: 2 as 310Γ) (Sun)	60' (Mon-Sat); 100' (Sun)	
310	310Β	Rafina-Nea Makri-Marathonas-Grammatiko	Special Local	53.8	90	6:00-21:50 (Mon-Sat); 7:10-21:45 (Sun)	15 (Mon-Sat); 9 (Sun)	60' (Mon-Sat); 100' (Sun)	
310	310Γ	Rafina-Mati-Nea Makri-Marathonas (via Paralia)	Special Local		96	6:00-21:50 (Mon-Sat); 7:10-21:45 (Sun)	15 (Mon-Sat); 9 (Sun)	60' (Mon-Sat); 100' (Sun)	
310	310	Doukissis Plakentias Station-Glyka Nera-Paiania-Koropi Station	Local		71	5:45-21:40 (Mon-Sat); 7:10-21:40 (Sun)	49 (Mon-Sat); 24 (Sun)	20' (Mon-Sat); 35-40' (Sun)	
310	310	Koropi Station-Paiania-SEA Attikis Odou	Local			5:45-21:40 (Mon-Sat); 7:10-21:40 (Sun)	49 (Mon-Sat); 24 (Sun)	20' (Mon-Sat); 35-40' (Sun)	
311		Koropi station-Kalyvia Thorikou	Local	33.2	60	5:40–21:00 (Mon–Sat); 8:10–17:30 (Sun)	13 (Mon–Sat); 7 (Sun)	40'-45' (Mon–Sun)	
314	314	Doukissis Plakentias Station-Pallini-Rafina	Local	38.1	100	5:10-23:30 (Mon-Sat); 7:35-23:00 (Sun)	54 (Note: 13 via Panorama 11 as 314B (2 via Panorama) 6 as 314Γ) (Mon-Fri); 40 (Note: 5 via Panorama 8 as 314B 5 as 314Γ) (Sat); 27 (Note: 4 via Panorama 4 as 314B 4 as 314Γ) (Sun)	20' (Mon-Fri); 25' (Sat); 30-35' (Sun)	
314	314	Doukissis Plakentias Station-Pallini-Rafina	Local	36.0	98	5:10-23:30 (Mon-Sat); 7:35-23:00 (Sun)	54 (Mon-Fri); 40 (Sat); 27 (Sun)	20' (Mon-Fri); 25' (Sat); 30-35' (Sun)	
314	314Β	Doukissis Plakentias Station-Pallini-Neos Voutzas	Special Local	38.3	104	5:10-23:30 (Mon-Sat); 7:35-23:00 (Sun)	54 (Mon-Fri); 40 (Sat); 27 (Sun)	20' (Mon-Fri); 25' (Sat); 30-35' (Sun)	
314	314Γ	Doukissis Plakentias Station-Pallini-Nea Makri	Special Local	48.9	127	5:10-23:30 (Mon-Sat); 7:35-23:00 (Sun)	54 (Mon-Fri); 40 (Sat); 27 (Sun)	20' (Mon-Fri); 25' (Sat); 30-35' (Sun)	
314	314	Doukissis Plakentias Station-Nomarchia Anat. Attikis-Pallini	Local	31.4	92	5:15-23:30 (Mon-Sat); 8:30-23:30 (Sun)	47 (Mon-Fri); 45 (Sat); 27 (Sun)	20-25' (Mon-Sat); 35' (Sun)	
314	Pre-2004 route 314 is listed with route 315 as it was a rush-hour variation of the specific route.								
315	315	Nomismatokopio Station-Pallini	Local		63	5:00-23:35 (Mon-Sat); 7:20-22:15 (Sun)	35 (Mon-Fri); 29 (Sat); 18 (Sun)	30' (Mon-Fri); 35-40' (Sat); 50' (Sun)	
315	315	Ethniki Amyna Station-Pallini	Local			5:00-23:30 (Mon-Sun)	48 (Mon-Fri); 46 (Sat); 38 (Sun)	20-25' (Mon-Sat); 30' (Sun)	
315	315	Ethniki Amyna Station-Pallini	Local			5:00-23:30 (Mon-Fri); 5:00-23:00 (Sat-Sun)	47 (Note: 14 as 314) (Mon-Fri); 19 (Sat-Sun)	20-25' (Mon-Fri); 55-60' (Sat-Sun)	
315	314	Ethniki Amyna Station-Nomarchia Anat. Attikis-Pallini	Limited Local			5:00-23:30 (Mon-Fri); 5:00-23:00 (Sat-Sun)	47 (Mon-Fri); 19 (Sat-Sun)	20-25' (Mon-Fri); 55-60' (Sat-Sun)	
316		Listed as part of route 304, as it is an evening variation of the specific route.							
319		Doukissis Plakentias Station-Pallini-Ekptotiko Chorio-Spata	Local	32.9	85	6:00-23:20 (Mon-Sat); 7:45-22:15 (Sun)	46 (Mon-Fri); 39 (Sat); 30 (Sun)	20-25' (Mon-Fri); 25-30' (Sat); 30' (Sun)	
319		Doukissis Plakentias Station-Spata	Local			6:00-23:20 (Mon-Sun)	56 (Mon-Fri); 50 (Sat); 43 (Sun)	15-20' (Mon-Sat); 25' (Sun)	
319		Ethniki Amyna Station-Christoupoli-Spata	Limited Local		70	7:15-19:25 (Mon-Sat); 7:30-19:20 (Sun)	6 (Mon-Fri); 5 (Sat-Sun)	135' (Mon-Sat); 160' (Sun)	
320		Koropi Station-Keratea-Lavrio	Local	69.8	43	5:20-22:55 (Mon-Sat); 8:05-22:55 (Sun)	25 (Mon-Fri); 19 (Sat); 15 (Sun)	40' (Mon-Fri); 55' (Sat); 60' (Sun)	
320		Spata Local	Local		21	5:10-23:35 (Mon-Sat); 7:40-22:35 (Sun)	43 (Mon-Fri); 44 (Sat); 35 (Sun)	25' (Mon-Sun)	
321		Listed as part of route 304, as they shared large common sections.							
322		Listed as part of route 323, as it was its clockwise counterpart.							
323	323	Agios Nikolaos-Agia Kyriaki-Vravrona	Limited Local	36.0	102	5:20-18:50 (Mon-Sun)	9 (Mon-Sun)	100' (Mon-Sun)	
323	323	Vravrona-Agios Nikolaos	Local		89	5:20-19:15 (Mon-Sun)	25 (Note: 14 as 322 and 11 as 323) (Mon-Sun)	Loop Total; 35' (Mon-Sun); 322 Sections; 60' (Mon-Sun); 323 Sections; 80' (Mon-Sun)	
323	322	Agios Nikolaos-Vravrona	Local		59	5:20-19:15 (Mon-Sun)	25 (Mon-Sun)	Loop Total; 35' (Mon-Sun); 322 Sections; 60' (Mon-Sun); 323 Sections; 80' (Mon-Sun)	
324		Anthousa-Pallini-Kantza	Local	32.5	85	6:00-21:00 (Mon-Fri); 6:45-20:35 (Sat-Sun)	20 (Mon-Fri); 11 (Sat-Sun)	45-50' (Mon-Fri); 80' (Sat-Sun)	
324		Pallini-Ergatikes Katoikies-Kantza	Local		43	5:50-20:00 (Mon-Sat)	14 (Mon-Sat)	65' (Mon-Sat)	
324		Pallini-Ergatikes Katoikies-Kantza	Local		43	5:50-20:30 (Mon-Fri); 5:50-20:00 (Sat)	28 (Mon-Fri); 16 (Sat)	30-35' (Mon-Fri); 55' (Sat)	
324		Ethniki Amyna Station-Kantza-Pallini	Limited Local			6:10-19:35 (Mon-Fri); 6:10-19:00 (Sat)	10 (Mon-Fri); 7 (Sat)	90' (Mon-Fri); 130' (Sat)	
326		Listed as part of route 304, as it is a localised variation of the specific route.							
330		Koropi-Agia Marina	Local	43.8	108	6:35-21:35 (Mon-Sat); 8:50-20:00 (Sun)	18 (Mon-Fri); 17 (Sat); 14 (Sun)	50-55' (Mon-Sun)	
330		Koropi-Agia Marina	Local	43.8	108	5:50-21:30 (Mon-Sun)	28 (Mon-Fri); 16 (Sat)	30-35' (Mon-Fri); 55' (Sat)	

=== 4XX Routes ===
These routes serve Agia Paraskevi, Halandri, Holargos, Melissia, Nea Penteli, Neo Psychiko, Papagou, Penteli and Vrilissia. Areas that are not part of sector 4 but are or were served by these routes include Agioi Anargyroi (420, 421), Athens (420, 444, 450), Egaleo (420), Galatsi (444), Irakleio (441), Kallithea (450), Marousi (402, 410, 411, 444, 446, 448), Nea Filadelfeia (421), Nea Ionia (421, 441, 444), Palaio Faliro (450), Peristeri (420), Piraeus (420), Psychiko (450), Rentis (420).

4XX Routes
Number		Route	Route Type	Length (in km)	Stops	Operating Hours	Daily Trips	Avg. Frequency	Map
401		Halandri-Metamorfosi	Local		29	5:00-23:30 (Mon-Sun)	68 (Mon-Fri); 49 (Sat); 37 (Sun)	15' (Mon-Fri); 20-25' (Sat); 30' (Sun)	
402		Katechaki Station-Polydroso	Local	14.8	51	5:00-23:30 (Mon-Sat); 8:30-23:30 (Sun)	51 (Mon-Fri); 40 (Sat); 28 (Sun)	20' (Mon-Fri); 25-30' (Sat); 30-35' (Sun)	
402		Katechaki Station-Polydroso	Local	14.8	51	5:00-23:30 (Mon-Sat); 8:40-23:30 (Sun)	51 (Mon-Fri); 42 (Sat); 24 (Sun)	20-25' (Mon-Fri); 25-30' (Sat); 35-40' (Sun)	
403		Katechaki Station-Agia Paraskevi-Ano Vrilissia	Local	25.8	77	5:30-23:00 (Mon-Fri); 5:30-21:15 (Sat); 7:00-21:15 (Sun)	35 (Mon-Fri); 27 (Sat); 18 (Sun)	30' (Mon-Fri); 35' (Sat); 45-50' (Sun)	
404		Ethniki Amyna Station-Halandri Station	Local	13.5	47	6:00-23:00 (Mon-Sat)	14 (Mon-Sat)	60' (Mon-Sat)	
404		Katechaki Station-Metamorfosi	Local			6:00-23:30 (Mon-Sat); 6:35-23:30 (Sun)	53 (Mon-Fri); 44 (Sat); 35 (Sun)	20' (Mon-Fri); 25' (Sat); 30' (Sun)	
405		Halandri Station-Melissia	Local	16.5	53	5:35-23:25 (Mon-Sat); 8:45-23:25 (Sun)	38 (Mon-Fri); 32 (Sat); 21 (Sun)	25-30' (Mon-Fri); 35' (Sat); 45' (Sun)	
405		Doukissis Plakentias Station-Melissia	Local	14.9	46	5:30-23:25 (Mon-Sat); 8:45-23:25 (Sun)	46 (Mon-Fri); 40 (Sat); 31 (Sun)	25' (Mon-Fri); 25-30' (Sat); 30' (Sun)	
406		Nomismatokopio Station-Doukissis Plakentias Station-Pefkakia	Local	19.6	64	5:10-22:55 (Mon-Sat); 8:00-21:40 (Sun)	37 (Mon-Fri); 28 (Sat); 24 (Sun)	30' (Mon-Fri); 40' (Sat); 35' (Sun)	
406		Ethniki Amyna Station-Kontopefko-Pefkakia	Local			5:05-23:15 (Mon-Sun)	45 (Mon-Fri); 43 (Sat); 38 (Sun)	25' (Mon-Sat); 30' (Sun)	
407		Nomismatokopio Station-Nea Zoi-Doukissis Plakentias Station	Local	14.0	48	5:00-23:00 (Mon-Sat); 7:30-21:20 (Sun)	54 (Mon-Fri); 38 (Sat); 17 (Sun)	20' (Mon-Fri); 30' (Sat); 50' (Sun)	
407		Katechaki Station-Agia Paraskevi (via Nea Zoi)	Local			5:00-23:15 (Mon-Sat); 5:30-23:15 (Sun)	53 (Mon-Fri); 54 (Sat); 43 (Sun)	20' (Mon-Sat); 25' (Sun)	
408		Listed as part of route 409, as it was an extended variant of the specific route.							
409	409	Ethniki Amyna Station-Papagou	Local	12.0	42	5:00-23:45 (Mon-Fri); 5:10-23:45 (Sat); 7:30-21:55 (Sun)	50 (Note: 1 extended to Akadimia) (Mon-Fri); 42 (Sat); 23 (Sun)	20-25' (Mon-Fri); 25-30' (Sat); 40' (Sun)	
409	409	Ethniki Amyna Station-Katechaki Station-Papagou	Local	10.4	32	5:00-23:45 (Mon-Sat); 6:55-22:45 (Sun)	71 (Note: 37 as 409 (3 as 409-413 combined route and 1 to Akadimia) 34 as 413) (Mon-Fri); 63 (Note: 33 as 409 (3 as 409-413 combined route and 1 to Akadimia) 30 as 413) (Sat); 46 (Note: 24 as 409 (2 as 409-413 combined route) 22 as 413) (Sun)	Loop Total: 15-20' (Mon-Sun); Individual Sections: 30-35' (Mon-Sat); 40' (Sun)	
409	413	Katechaki Station-Ethniki Amyna Station-Papagou	Local	10.7	36	5:00-23:45 (Mon-Sat); 6:55-22:45 (Sun)	71 (Mon-Fri); 63 (Sat); 46 (Sun)	Loop Total: 15-20' (Mon-Sun); Individual Sections: 30-35' (Mon-Sat); 40' (Sun)	
409	408	Akadimia-Papagou	Eastern	23.9	73	5:00-23:10 (Mon-Sat); 5:30-23:10 (Sun)	102 (Note: 54 as 408 and 48 as 409) (Mon-Fri); 83 (Note: 44 as 408 and 39 as 409) (Sat); 39 (Note: all as 408) (Sun)	Common Section: 10-15' (Mon-Sat); 25-30' (Sun); 408-only Section: 20' (Mon-Fri); 25-30' (Sat-Sun)	
409	409	Ethniki Amyna Station-Papagou	Local	12.0	42	5:00-23:10 (Mon-Sat); 5:30-23:10 (Sun)	102 (Mon-Fri); 83 (Sat); 39 (Sun)	Common Section: 10-15' (Mon-Sat); 25-30' (Sun); 408-only Section: 20' (Mon-Fri); 25-30' (Sat-Sun)	
410		OAKA-Ano Melissia	Local	17.9	56	5:00-0:00 (Mon-Sat); 6:00-21:00 (Sun)	48 (Mon-Fri); 39 (Note: 11 via Melissia cemetery) (Sat); 27 (Note: 10 via Melissia cemetery) (Sun)	20-25' (Mon-Fri); 30-35' (Sat-Sun)	
410		Marousi Station-Ano Melissia	Local		47	5:00-23:45 (Mon-Sun)	57 (Mon-Fri); 41 (Sat-Sun)	20' (Mon-Fri); 25-30' (Sat-Sun)	
411		Doukissis Plakentias Station-Sismanogleio-Halandri	Local	19.3	56	5:40-22:55 (Mon-Sat); 7:00-21:25 (Sun)	33 (Mon-Fri); 31 (Sat); 15 (Sun)	30-35' (Mon-Sat); 60' (Sun)	
411		Doukissis Plakentias Station-Sismanogleio-Halandri	Local	19.3	56	5:40-23:05 (Mon-Sun)	46 (Mon-Fri); 38 (Sat); 31 (Sun)	20-25' (Mon-Fri); 25-30' (Sat); 35' (Sun)	
411		Halandri-NIEN-Agios Silas	Local			5:40-23:00 (Mon-Fri); 5:40-22:30 (Sat-Sun)	25 (Mon-Fri); 16 (Sat-Sun)	40-45' (Mon-Fri); 60' (Sat-Sun)	
412		Polydroso-Nea Penteli	Local	28.1	91	5:30-23:00 (Mon-Sat); 9:00-23:00 (Sun)	58 (Mon-Fri); 51 (Sat); 28 (Sun)	15-20' (Mon-Sat); 30' (Sun)	
412		Polydroso-Doukissis Plakentias Station-Melissia	Local			5:30-23:00 (Mon-Sat); 9:00-23:00 (Sun)	58 (Mon-Fri); 51 (Sat); 28 (Sun)	15-20' (Mon-Sat); 30' (Sun)	
412		Polydroso-Patima	Local			5:30-23:00 (Mon-Sat); 9:00-23:00 (Sun)	58 (Mon-Fri); 51 (Sat); 28 (Sun)	15-20' (Mon-Sat); 30' (Sun)	
413		Listed as part of route 409, as it was its clockwise counterpart.							
416	416	Ethniki Amyna Station-Holargos	Local	6.2	22	5:00-23:55 (Mon-Fri); 5:15-23:55 (Sat); 7:50-22:45 (Sun)	67 (Mon-Fri); 47 (Sat); 36 (Sun)	15-20' (Mon-Fri); 25' (Sat-Sun)	
416	416	Katechaki Station-Holargos	Local		27	5:00-23:00 (Mon-Sun)	91 (Note: 49 as Γ5 and 42 as 416) (Mon-Fri); 79 (Note: 45 as Γ5 and 34 as 416) (Sat); 39 (Note: all as Γ5) (Sun)	Common Section: 10-15' (Mon-Sat); 25-30' (Sun); Γ5-only Section: 20-25' (Mon-Sat); 25-30' (Sun)	
416	Γ5	Akadimia-Holargos	Trunk	17.3	53	5:00-23:00 (Mon-Sun)	91 (Mon-Fri); 79 (Sat); 39 (Sun)	Common Section: 10-15' (Mon-Sat); 25-30' (Sun); Γ5-only Section: 20-25' (Mon-Sat); 25-30' (Sun)	
418	418	Ethniki Amyna Station-Scholeia Holargou	Local	7.9	25	5:20-23:15 (Mon-Sat); 7:50-22:00 (Sun)	56 (Mon-Fri); 47 (Sat); 28 (Sun)	15-20' (Mon-Fri); 20-25' (Sat); 30' (Sun)	
418	418	Katechaki Station-Dimarcheio Holargou	Local		26	5:20-22:20 (Mon-Sun)	82 (Note: 45 as 419 and 37 as 418) (Mon-Fri); 54 (Note: 34 as 419 and 20 as 418) (Sat); 32 (Note: all as 419) (Sun)	Common Section: 10-15' (Mon-Fri); 20' (Sat); 30-35' (Sun); 419-only Section: 20-25' (Mon-Fri); 30-35' (Sat-Sun)	
418	418	Neo Psychiko-Scholeia Holargou	Local	13.7	42	5:20-22:20 (Mon-Sun)	82 (Mon-Fri); 54 (Sat); 32 (Sun)	Common Section: 10-15' (Mon-Fri); 20' (Sat); 30-35' (Sun); 419-only Section: 20-25' (Mon-Fri); 30-35' (Sat-Sun)	
418	419	Akadimia-Scholeia Holargou	Eastern	18.2	54	5:20-22:20 (Mon-Sun)	82 (Mon-Fri); 54 (Sat); 32 (Sun)	Common Section: 10-15' (Mon-Fri); 20' (Sat); 30-35' (Sun); 419-only Section: 20-25' (Mon-Fri); 30-35' (Sat-Sun)	
420		Agioi Anargyroi-Piraeus (via Kifissou)	Intermunicipal Western	35.6	93	5:00-0:00 (Mon-Sat); 6:05-23:00 (Sun)	54 (Mon-Fri); 44 (Sat); 24 (Sun)	20' (Mon-Fri); 25' (Sat); 40-45' (Sun)	
420		Agioi Anargyroi-Piraeus (via Kifissou)	Intermunicipal Western	35.6	93	5:00-23:30 (Mon-Sun)	66 (Mon-Fri); 52 (Sat); 41 (Sun)	15-20' (Mon-Sat); 25-30' (Sun)	
421	421	Agioi Anargyroi-Agia Paraskevi	Intermunicipal Northern	26.9	81	5:00-23:20 (Mon-Sun)	83 (Mon-Fri); 56 (Sat); 41 (Sun)	10-15' (Mon-Fri); 20' (Sat); 25' (Sun)	
421	421	Agioi Anargyroi-Agia Paraskevi	Intermunicipal Northern	26.9	81	5:00-23:20 (Mon-Sun)	120 (Note: 18 as 441) (Mon-Fri); 102 (Note: 14 as 441) (Sat); 68 (Sun)	Common Section: 10' (Mon-Sat); 15' (Sun); 421-only Section: 10-15' (Mon-Sat); 20' (Sun); 441-only Section: 50' (Mon-Fri); 65' (Sat-Sun)	
421	441	Irakleio Station-Halandri-Agia Paraskevi	Local	17.7	50	5:00-23:20 (Mon-Sun)	120 (Mon-Fri); 102 (Sat); 68 (Sun)	Common Section: 10' (Mon-Sat); 15' (Sun); 421-only Section: 10-15' (Mon-Sat); 20' (Sun); 441-only Section: 50' (Mon-Fri); 65' (Sat-Sun)	
423		Halandri Station-Nea Penteli	Local		40	6:05-23:30 (Mon-Sun)	53 (Mon-Fri); 48 (Sat); 41 (Sun)	20-25' (Mon-Sun)	
426		Halandri Station-Palaia Penteli	Local	21.2	62	5:30-23:40 (Mon-Sun)	52 (Mon-Fri); 43 (Sat); 28 (Sun)	20' (Mon-Fri); 25' (Sat); 40' (Sun)	
441		Listed as part of route 421, as it was a localised version of this route.							
444		Ano Patisia Station-Galatsi-Eirini Station	Intermunicipal Northern	18.3	48	5:40-22:30 (Mon-Fri); 6:30-21:40 (Sat); 7:00-21:30 (Sun)	24 (Mon-Sun)	40-45' (Mon-Fri); 35-40' (Sat-Sun)	
444		Ano Patisia Station-Galatsi-Halandri Station	Intermunicipal Northern	25.2	70	5:40-22:30 (Mon-Fri); 6:30-21:40 (Sat); 7:00-21:30 (Sun)	29 (Mon-Fri); 30 (Sat); 24 (Sun)	35-40' (Sun-Fri); 30' (Sat)	
444		Ano Patisia Station-Galatsi-Halandri	Intermunicipal Northern			5:30-22:15 (Mon-Sat)	40 (Mon-Sat)	25' (Mon-Sat)	
446		Marousi Station-Nosokomeio Pentelis (via PIKPA)	Local	27.8	92	5:40-23:40 (Mon-Sat); 7:10-21:40 (Sun)	37 (Mon-Fri); 31 (Sat); 20 (Sun)	30' (Mon-Fri); 35' (Sat); 45' (Sun)	
446		Marousi Station-Nosokomeio Pentelis (via PIKPA)	Local	27.8	92	5:40-23:00 (Mon-Sat)	52 (Mon-Fri); 41 (Sat); 38 (Sun)	20' (Mon-Fri); 25-30' (Sat-Sun)	
447		Halandri-Ano Vrilissia	Local	19.1	66	5:00-23:30 (Mon-Sat); 7:40-22:30 (Sun)	35 (Mon-Fri); 32 (Sat); 24 (Sun)	30-35' (Mon-Fri); 35' (Sat); 35-40' (Sun)	
447		Halandri-Ano Vrilissia	Local	19.1	66	5:00-23:00 (Mon-Sat)	66 (Mon-Fri); 45 (Sat); 38 (Sun)	15' (Mon-Fri); 25 (Sat); 30' (Sun)	
448		Marousi Station-Ano Vrilissia	Local	21.2	60	5:00-23:00 (Mon-Sat); 6:00-23:00 (Sun)	42 (Mon-Fri); 35 (Sat); 23 (Sun)	25' (Mon-Fri); 30' (Sat); 45' (Sun)	
450	450	Halandri Station-Halandri-Nea Penteli	Local	19.3	70	5:25-23:30 (Mon-Sat); 7:00-22:35 (Sun)	75 (Note: 37 as 450 and 38 as 451) (Mon-Fri); 65 (Note: 32 as 450 and 33 as 451) (Sat); 46 (Note: 23 as 450 and 23 as 451) (Sun)	Loop Total: 15' (Mon-Sat); 20' (Sun); Individual Sections: 25-30' (Mon-Fri); 30-35' (Sat); 40' (Sun)	
450	451	Halandri Station-Nea Penteli-Halandri	Local	20.3	65	5:25-23:30 (Mon-Sat); 7:00-22:35 (Sun)	75 (Mon-Fri); 65 (Sat); 46 (Sun)	Loop Total: 15' (Mon-Sat); 20' (Sun); Individual Sections: 25-30' (Mon-Fri); 30-35' (Sat); 40' (Sun)	
450	Pre-2008 route 450 is listed as part of route 550, as they shared a large common section.								
451	Current route 451 is listed as part of route 450, as it is its anticlockwise counterpart.								
451	451A	Halandri Station-Nea Penteli	Local	23.0	76	5:15-23:30 (Mon-Sun)	85 (Note: 42 as 451A 43 as 451B (5 via Drafi)) (Mon-Fri); 63 (Note: 31 as 451A 32 as 451B) (Sat); 51 (Note: 23 as 451A 28 as 451B) (Sun)	Loop Total: 10-15' (Mon-Fri); 15-20' (Sat-Sun); Individual Sections: 25' (Mon-Fri); 35' (Sat); 40' (Sun)	
451	451B	Halandri Station-Palaia Penteli (via Kallithea)	Local	37.9	104	5:15-23:30 (Mon-Sun)	85 (Mon-Fri); 63 (Sat); 51 (Sun)	Loop Total: 10-15' (Mon-Fri); 15-20' (Sat-Sun); Individual Sections: 25' (Mon-Fri); 35' (Sat); 40' (Sun)	
460	460	Halandri Station-Halandri-Palaia Penteli	Local	24.2	76	5:00-23:45 (Mon-Sat); 5:40-23:20 (Sun)	78 (Note: 38 as 460 and 40 as 461) (Mon-Fri); 67 (Note: 33 as 460 and 34 as 461) (Sat); 49 (Note: 24 as 460 and 25 as 461) (Sun)	Loop Total: 15' (Mon-Sat); 20' (Sun); Individual Sections: 25-30' (Mon-Fri); 30-35' (Sat); 40-45' (Sun)	
460	461	Halandri Station-Palaia Penteli-Halandri	Local	24.3	75	5:00-23:45 (Mon-Sat); 5:40-23:20 (Sun)	78 (Mon-Fri); 67 (Sat); 49 (Sun)	Loop Total: 15' (Mon-Sat); 20' (Sun); Individual Sections: 25-30' (Mon-Fri); 30-35' (Sat); 40-45' (Sun)	

=== 5XX Routes ===
These routes serve Agios Stefanos, Afidnes, Anoixi, Dionysos, Drosia, Ekali, Kapandriti, Kifisia, Kryoneri, Lykovrysi, Marousi, Metamorfosi, Nea Erythraia, Pefki, Piraeus, Polydendri, Rodopoli, Stamata, Varympompi, Varnavas, Markopoulo Oropou and Skala Oropou. Areas that are not part of sector 5 but are or were served by these routes include Athens (550), Chalandri (550), Filothei (550), Kallithea (550), Melissia (530, 555), Nea Penteli (530), Nea Smyrni (550), Neo Psychiko (550), Palaio Faliro (550), Psychiko (550), Thrakomakedones (504) and Vrilissia (555).

5XX Routes
Number		Route	Route Type	Length (in km)	Stops	Operating Hours		Daily Trips		Avg. Frequency		Map
501	501	Marousi-Pefki	Local	9.2	29	5:30-22:15 (Mon-Fri); 6:30-20:45 (Sat); 6:30-20:30 (Sun)		25 (Mon-Fri); 20 (Sat); 15 (Sun)		40' (Mon-Fri); 45' (Sat); 60' (Sun)		
501	501	Marousi-Pefki	Local	10.8	29	5:00-23:30 (Mon-Sat); 7:45-22:00 (Sun)	5:00-23:30 (Mon-Sun)	59 (Note: 30 as 501 and 29 as 527) (Mon-Fri); 51 (Note: 26 as 501 and 25 as 527) (Sat); 41 (Note: 21 as 501 and 20 as 527) (Sun)	90 (Note: 45 as 501 and 45 as 527) (Mon-Fri); 59 (Note: 30 as 501 and 29 as 527) (Sat-Sun)	Loop Total: 20-25' (Mon-Sun); Per Direction: 35-40' (Mon-Fri); 40-45' (Sat-Sun)	Loop Total: 10-15' (Mon-Fri); 20-25' (Sat-Sun); Per Direction: 25' (Mon-Fri); 35-40' (Sat-Sun)	
501	527	Marousi-Pefki	Local	11.0	35	5:00-23:30 (Mon-Sat); 7:45-22:00 (Sun)	5:00-23:30 (Mon-Sun)	59 (Mon-Fri); 51 (Sat); 41 (Sun)	90 (Mon-Fri); 59 (Sat-Sun)	Loop Total: 20-25' (Mon-Sun); Per Direction: 35-40' (Mon-Fri); 40-45' (Sat-Sun)	Loop Total: 10-15' (Mon-Fri); 20-25' (Sat-Sun); Per Direction: 25' (Mon-Fri); 35-40' (Sat-Sun)	
503		Zirineio-Varympompi	Limited Local	23.6	57	5:40-22:40 (Mon-Sat); 8:45-22:40 (Sun)		14 (Mon-Sat); 11 (Sun)		75' (Mon-Sat); 80' (Sun)		
503		Zirineio-Varympompi	Limited Local	23.6	57	5:40-20:00 (Mon-Sun)		12 (Mon-Sun)		75' (Mon-Sun)		
504		Kifisia-Thrakomakedones	Local	30.2	69	5:00-23:35 (Mon-Sat); 6:40-23:35 (Sun)		60 (Mon-Fri); 44 (Sat); 30 (Sun)		15-20' (Mon-Fri); 25' (Sat); 35' (Sun)		
504		Kifisia-Thrakomakedones	Local	30.2	69	5:00-23:35 (Mon-Sat); 7:50-23:35 (Sun)		41 (Mon-Fri); 34 (Sat); 24 (Sun)		25-30' (Mon-Fri); 30-35' (Sat); 40' (Sun)		
507		Zirineio-Rodopoli-Stamata	Local	28.1	84	5:00-23:45 (Mon-Sat); 7:35-22:25 (Sun)		44 (Mon-Fri); 38 (Sat); 23 (Sun)		25' (Mon-Fri); 30' (Sat); 40' (Sun)		
507		Zirineio-Rodopoli-Stamata	Local	28.1	84	5:00-23:30 (Mon-Fri); 5:00-19:30 (Sun); 5:00-21:30 (Sun)		43 (Mon-Fri); 27 (Sat-Sun)		25' (Mon-Fri); 30-35' (Sat-Sun)		
508		Listed as part of route 509, as they shared large common sections.										
509	509	Zirineio-Agios Stefanos-Kryoneri	Local	35.5	105	5:05-23:30 (Mon-Sat); 6:00-23:30 (Sun)		63 (Note: 6 as 509B 3 as 510 8 via Kynourias 1 via Pefkofyto and Kynourias) (Mon-Fri); 53 (Note: 3 as 509B 6 as 510) (Sat); 41 (Note: 6 as 510) (Sun)		15-20' (Mon-Fri); 25' (Sat); 30' (Sun)		
509	509B	Zirineio-Afidnes-Polydendri-Kapandriti-Varnavas	Special Local	60.3	109	5:05-23:30 (Mon-Sat); 6:00-23:30 (Sun)		63 (Mon-Fri); 53 (Sat); 41 (Sun)		15-20' (Mon-Fri); 25' (Sat); 30' (Sun)		
509	510	Zirineio-Markopoulo-Skala Oropou	Special Local	76.9	115	5:05-23:30 (Mon-Sat); 6:00-23:30 (Sun)		63 (Mon-Fri); 53 (Sat); 41 (Sun)		15-20' (Mon-Fri); 25' (Sat); 30' (Sun)		
509	508	Zirineio-Agios Stefanos	Local	25.0	81	5:00-23:35 (Mon-Sat); 6:00-23:35 (Sun)	5:00-23:15 (Mon-Fri); 5:00-23:35 (Sat-Sun)	65 (Note: 31 as 508 (1 via Pefkofyto) 34 as 509) (Mon-Fri); 57 (Note: 28 as 508 29 as 509) (Sat); 42 (Note: 20 as 508 22 as 509) (Sun)	59 (Note: 27 as 508 (6 via Pefkofyto) 32 as 509) (Mon-Fri); 49 (Note: 23 as 508 (3 via Pefkofyto) 26 as 509) (Sat); 46 (Note: 22 as 508 24 as 509) (Sun)	Common Section: 15-20' (Mon-Sat); 25' (Sun); Individual Sections: 30-35' (Mon-Fri); 35-40' (Sat); 45-50' (Sun)	Common Section: 15-20' (Mon-Fri); 20-25' (Sat-Sun); Individual Sections: 35' (Mon-Fri); 40-45' (Sat); 45-50' (Sun)	
509	509	Zirineio-Kryoneri	Local		103	5:00-23:35 (Mon-Sat); 6:00-23:35 (Sun)	5:00-23:15 (Mon-Fri); 5:00-23:35 (Sat-Sun)	65 (Mon-Fri); 57 (Sat); 42 (Sun)	59 (Mon-Fri); 49 (Sat); 46 (Sun)	Common Section: 15-20' (Mon-Sat); 25' (Sun); Individual Sections: 30-35' (Mon-Fri); 35-40' (Sat); 45-50' (Sun)	Common Section: 15-20' (Mon-Fri); 20-25' (Sat-Sun); Individual Sections: 35' (Mon-Fri); 40-45' (Sat); 45-50' (Sun)	
510		Listed as part of route 509, as it is a special extended variant of the specific route.										
522	522	Kifisia Station-Adames	Local	13.1	36	5:00-23:30 (Mon-Sat); 7:50-22:00 (Sun)		66 (Note: 33 as 522 and 33 as 523) (Mon-Fri); 50 (Note: 25 as 522 and 25 as 523) (Sat); 42 (Note: 21 as 522 and 21 as 523) (Sun)		Loop Total: 15-20' (Mon-Fri); 20-25' (Sat-Sun); Per Direction: 30-35' (Mon-Fri); 45' (Sat); 40' (Sun)		
522	523	Kifisia Station-Adames	Local	15.0	45	5:00-23:30 (Mon-Sat); 7:50-22:00 (Sun)		66 (Mon-Fri); 50 (Sat); 42 (Sun)		Loop Total: 15-20' (Mon-Fri); 20-25' (Sat-Sun); Per Direction: 30-35' (Mon-Fri); 45' (Sat); 40' (Sun)		
522	522	Kifisia Station-Adames	Local			5:00-23:45 (Mon-Sun)		60 (Note: 31 as 522 and 29 as 523) (Mon-Fri); 46 (Note: 23 as 522 and 23 as 523) (Sat); 39 (Note: 20 as 522 and 19 as 523) (Sun)		Loop Total: 20' (Mon-Fri); 25' (Sat); 30' (Sun); Per Direction: 35' (Mon-Fri); 50' (Sat); 55' (Sun)		
522	523	Kifisia Station-Adames	Local			5:00-23:45 (Mon-Sun)		60 (Mon-Fri); 46 (Sat); 39 (Sun)		Loop Total: 20' (Mon-Fri); 25' (Sat); 30' (Sun); Per Direction: 35' (Mon-Fri); 50' (Sat); 55' (Sun)		
523		Listed as part of route 522, as it is its clockwise counterpart.										
524	524	Kifisia Station-Politeia	Local	6.4	21	5:55-23:30 (Mon-Sat); 8:00-22:00 (Sun)		57 (Note: 29 as 524 and 28 as 526) (Mon-Fri); 47 (Note: 24 as 524 and 23 as 526) (Sat); 25 (Note: 13 as 524 and 12 as 526) (Sun)		Loop Total: 15-20' (Mon-Fri); 20-25' (Sat); 35' (Sun); Per Direction: 30-35' (Mon-Fri); 45' (Sat); 70' (Sun)		
524	526	Kifissia Station-Kefalari	Local	6.8	23	5:55-23:30 (Mon-Sat); 8:00-22:00 (Sun)		57 (Mon-Fri); 47 (Sat); 25 (Sun)		Loop Total: 15-20' (Mon-Fri); 20-25' (Sat); 35' (Sun); Per Direction: 30-35' (Mon-Fri); 45' (Sat); 70' (Sun)		
524	524	Kifisia Station-Politeia	Local			6:00-23:30 (Mon-Sun)		45 (Mon-Fri); 33 (Sat); 32 (Sun)		20-25' (Mon-Fri); 30-35' (Sat-Sun)		
525		Kifisia Station-Kato Kifisia	Local	6.9	23	6:00-20:00 (Mon-Sat)		20 (Mon-Sat)		45' (Mon-Sat)		
526		Listed as part of route 524, as it is its anti-clockwise counterpart.										
527		Nerantziotissa-Pefki	Local	8.7	22	5:55-21:50 (Mon-Fri); 6:55-20:20 (Sat); 7:00-20:05 (Sun)		24 (Mon-Fri); 19 (Sat); 14 (Sun)		40' (Mon-Fri); 45' (Sat); 60' (Sun)		
527		Pre-2014 route 527 is listed as part of route 501, as it was its clockwise counterpart.										
530		Kifisia Station-Melissia-Nea Penteli	Local	18.5	62	5:10-23:25 (Mon-Sat); 7:40-22:05 (Sun)		48 (Mon-Fri); 28 (Sat); 17 (Sun)		20-25' (Mon-Fri); 40' (Sat); 50-55' (Sun)		
530		Kifisia Station-Melissia-Nea Penteli	Local	18.5	62	5:10-23:30 (Mon-Sun)		43 (Mon-Fri); 34 (Sat); 22 (Sun)		25' (Mon-Fri); 30' (Sat); 50' (Sun)		
535	535	Zirineio-Efxeinos Pontos	Limited Local	28.8	79	6:10-22:15 (Mon-Fri); 6:30-22:15 (Sat); 8:10-22:10 (Sun)	6:30-22:15 (Mon-Fri); 6:40-22:05 (Sat); 6:50-22:05 (Sun)	17 (Note: 5 as 535A) (Mon-Fri); 14 (Note: 3 as 535A) (Sat); 9 (Note: 2 as 535A) (Sun)	17 (Mon-Fri); 11 (Sat); 10 (Sun)	60' (Mon-Fri); 70' (Sat); 100' (Sun)	60' (Mon-Fri); 90' (Sat); 100' (Sun)	
535	535A	Zirineio-Efxeinos Pontos-Fragma-Kalentzi	Special Local	44.2	91	6:10-22:15 (Mon-Fri); 6:30-22:15 (Sat); 8:10-22:10 (Sun)	6:30-22:15 (Mon-Fri); 6:40-22:05 (Sat); 6:50-22:05 (Sun)	17 (Mon-Fri); 14 (Sat); 9 (Sun)	17 (Mon-Fri); 11 (Sat); 10 (Sun)	60' (Mon-Fri); 70' (Sat); 100' (Sun)	60' (Mon-Fri); 90' (Sat); 100' (Sun)	
536		Zirineio-Dionysos	Local	29.6	91	5:15-23:30 (Mon-Sat); 5:50-23:30 (Sun)		57 (Mon-Fri); 45 (Sat); 30 (Sun)		20' (Mon-Fri); 25' (Sat); 35' (Sun)		
536		Zirineio-Dionysos	Local	29.6	91	5:20-23:30 (Mon-Sat); 5:50-23:30 (Sun)		41 (Mon-Fri); 32 (Sat); 21 (Sun)		25' (Mon-Fri); 35' (Sat); 50' (Sun)		
537		Acharnes-Varympompi	Limited Local	24.9	64	7:00-19:00 (Mon-Fri); 7:30-19:05 (Sat); 9:30-16:25 (Sun)		9 (Note: 1 via Thrakomakedones) (Mon-Fri); 7 (Sat); 6 (Sun)		100' (Mon-Sat); 75' (Sun)		
537		Acharnes-Varympompi	Limited Local	24.9	64	7:20-18:30 (Mon-Fri); 7:30-18:30 (Sat-Sun)		8 (Sun-Fri); 9 (Sat)		100' (Sun-Fri); 80' (Sat)		
538		Dionysos Local	Local	15.8	44	6:00-20:00 (Mon-Sat)		19 (Mon-Sat)		45' (Mon-Sat)		
541		Marousi Station-Metamorfosi	Local	14.0	45	6:00-20:20 (Mon-Sat)		16 (Mon-Sat)		55' (Mon-Sat)		
541		Marousi Station-Metamorfosi	Local	14.0	45	6:00-20:30 (Mon-Sun)		29 (Mon-Fri); 31 (Sat); 18 (Sun)		30' (Mon-Sat); 50' (Sun)		
542		Irakleio Station-Teloneio-Metamorfosi	Local	7.8	21	6:00-20:15 (Mon-Sun)		28 (Mon-Sun)		30' (Mon-Sun)		
543	543	Kifissia Station-Nosokomeio Agioi Anargyroi	Local	15.7	36	6:00-21:35 (Mon-Fri); 6:00-20:00 (Sat-Sun)	6:45-21:00 (Mon-Fri); 9:30-21:30 (Sat-Sun)	38 (Note: 8 as 543A) (Mon-Fri); 40 (Note: 4 as 543A) (Sat); 21 (Note: 4 as 543A) (Sun)	13 (Mon-Fri); 8 (Sat-Sun)	25' (Mon-Fri); 20' (Sat); 40-45' (Sun)	70' (Mon-Fri); 100' (Sat-Sun)	
543	543A	Kifissia Station-Nosokomeio Agioi Anargyroi (via Kaliftaki)	Local	18.0	39	6:00-21:35 (Mon-Fri); 6:00-20:00 (Sat-Sun)	6:45-21:00 (Mon-Fri); 9:30-21:30 (Sat-Sun)	38 (Mon-Fri); 40 (Sat); 21 (Sun)	13 (Mon-Fri); 8 (Sat-Sun)	25' (Mon-Fri); 20' (Sat); 40-45' (Sun)	70' (Mon-Fri); 100' (Sat-Sun)	
550	550	Kifisia-Palaio Faliro	24h Intermunicipal Northern	41.6	109	5:15-23:50 (Sun-Fri); 24h (Sat)	5:15-23:15 (Mon-Sun)	153 (Note: 94 as 550 and 59 as 10) (Mon-Fri); 114 (Note: 66 as 550 and 48 as 10) (Sat); 75 (Note: 39 as 550 and 36 as 10) (Sun)	181 (Note: 93 as 550 and 88 as 450) (Mon-Fri); 119 (Note: 60 as 550 and 59 as 10) (Sat); 90 (Note: 46 as 550 and 44 as 10) (Sun)	Common Section: 5-10' (Mon-Sat); 15' (Sun); 30' (Night); 550-only Sections: 10' (Mon-Fri); 20' (Sat); 25-30' (Sun); 30' (Night); 10-only Sections: 15-20' (Mon-Fri); 20-25' (Sat); 30' (Sun)	Common Section: 5' (Mon-Fri); 10-15' (Sat-Sun); Individual Sections: 10' (Mon-Fri); 15-20' (Sat); 25' (Sun)	
550	10	Chalandri-Tzitzifies	Trolleybus	29.5	86	5:15-23:50 (Sun-Fri); 24h (Sat)	5:15-23:15 (Mon-Sun)	153 (Mon-Fri); 114 (Sat); 75 (Sun)	181 (Mon-Fri); 119 (Sat); 90 (Sun)	Common Section: 5-10' (Mon-Sat); 15' (Sun); 30' (Night); 550-only Sections: 10' (Mon-Fri); 20' (Sat); 25-30' (Sun); 30' (Night); 10-only Sections: 15-20' (Mon-Fri); 20-25' (Sat); 30' (Sun)	Common Section: 5' (Mon-Fri); 10-15' (Sat-Sun); Individual Sections: 10' (Mon-Fri); 15-20' (Sat); 25' (Sun)	
550	450	Chalandri-Tzitzifies	Intermunicipal Northern	29.5	86	5:15-23:50 (Sun-Fri); 24h (Sat)	5:15-23:15 (Mon-Sun)	153 (Mon-Fri); 114 (Sat); 75 (Sun)	181 (Mon-Fri); 119 (Sat); 90 (Sun)	Common Section: 5-10' (Mon-Sat); 15' (Sun); 30' (Night); 550-only Sections: 10' (Mon-Fri); 20' (Sat); 25-30' (Sun); 30' (Night); 10-only Sections: 15-20' (Mon-Fri); 20-25' (Sat); 30' (Sun)	Common Section: 5' (Mon-Fri); 10-15' (Sat-Sun); Individual Sections: 10' (Mon-Fri); 15-20' (Sat); 25' (Sun)	
555		Lykovrysi-Marousi Station-Vrilissia	Intermunicipal Northern		91	5:10-22:25 (Mon-Fri); 6:10-22:25 (Sat); 7:00-22:25 (Sun)		28 (Mon-Fri); 21 (Sat); 13 (Sun)		35-40' (Mon-Fri); 45-50' (Sat); 75' (Sun)		
560	560	Kifissia Station-Mortero-Nea Erythraia	Local	10.6	33	6:00-20:15 (Mon-Sun)		17 (Mon-Sun)		50' (Mon-Sun)		
560	560	Kifissia Station-Mortero-Nea Erythraia	Limited Local	10.6	33	6:00-20:15 (Mon-Sun)		17 (Note: 11 as 560 and 6 as 561) (Mon-Sun)		Common Section: 50' (Mon-Sun); 560-only Sections: 80' (Mon-Sun); 561-only Sections: 140' (Mon-Sun)		
560	561	Kifissia Station-Politeia-Nea Erythraia	Limited Local	9.2	25	6:00-20:15 (Mon-Sun)		17 (Mon-Sun)		Common Section: 50' (Mon-Sun); 560-only Sections: 80' (Mon-Sun); 561-only Sections: 140' (Mon-Sun)		.
561		Listed as part of route 560, as they shared a large common section.										

=== 6XX Routes ===
These routes serve Filothei, Galatsi, Iraklio, Nea Halkidona, Nea Filadelfia, Nea Ionia and Psychiko. Areas that are not part of sector 6 but are or were served by these routes include Athens (601, 605, 608, 622, 651), Kiffisia (604), Marousi (600, 602), Metamorfosi (604, 619), Pefki (642) and Zografou (608, 622).

6XX Routes
Number		Route	Route Type	Length (in km)	Stops	Operating Hours		Daily Trips		Avg. Frequency		Map
600		Panormou Station-Eirini Station	Local		29	6:00-20:00 (Mon-Fri)		78 (Mon-Fri)		10' (Mon-Fri)		
601		Listed as part of route 651 as it was an extended variant of the specific route.										
602		Panormou Station-Kalogreza-Nea Ionia	Local	24.2	70	5:15-22:30 (Mon-Sat); 7:00-22:00 (Sun)		55 (Mon-Fri); 38 (Sat); 22 (Sun)		20' (Mon-Fri); 25-30' (Sat); 40' (Sun)		
602		Panormou Station-Kalogreza-Nea Ionia	Local	24.2	70	5:00-23:30 (Mon-Sun)		74 (Mon-Fri); 49 (Sat); 41 (Sun)		15' (Mon-Fri); 20-25' (Sat); 25-30' (Sun)		
603		Listed as part of route 653 as it was an extended variant of the specific route.										
604		Nea Ionia-Metamorfosi Station-Nosokomeio Agioi Anargyroi	Limited Local	22.7	49	6:10-19:55 (Mon-Sat)		11 (Mon-Sat)		80' (Mon-Sat)		
604		Nea Ionia-Metamorfosi	Limited Local	14.2	52	6:10-19:25 (Mon-Sat)		12 (Mon-Sat)		70' (Mon-Sat)		
604		Nea Ionia-Metamorfosi	Local	14.2	52	6:10-20:00 (Mon-Fri); 6:10-19:30 (Sat-Sun)		25 (Mon-Fri); 14 (Sat-Sun)		35' (Mon-Fri); 60' (Sat-Sun)		
605		Ano Patisia Station-Perissos	Local	11.9	38	5:00-23:20 (Mon-Sat); 7:00-21:00 (Sun)		49 (Mon-Fri); 36 (Sat); 20 (Sun)		20-25' (Mon-Fri); 30' (Sat); 45' (Sun)		
605		Polytechneio-Perissos	Northern	16.6	60	5:00-23:15 (Mon-Sat); 5:15-23:15 (Sun)		56 (Mon-Fri); 50 (Sat); 39 (Sun)		20' (Mon-Sat); 25-30' (Sun)		
608		Galatsi-Akadimia-Nekrotafeio Zografou	24h Eastern	27.6	86	5:00-0:00 (Sun-Fri); 24h (Sat)		159 (Mon-Fri); 85 (Sat); 63 (Sun)		5-10' (Mon-Fri); 15' (Sat-Sun); 30' (Night)		
608		Galatsi-Akadimia-Nekrotafeio Zografou	Eastern	27.6	86	5:00-0:00 (Mon-Sun)		172 (Mon-Fri); 122 (Sat); 75 (Sun)		5-10' (Mon-Sat); 15' (Sun)		
608		Akadimia-Galatsi	Northern	18.0	47	5:00-0:00 (Mon-Sun)		158 (Mon-Fri); 120 (Sat); 69 (Sun)		5-10' (Mon-Sat); 15' (Sun)		
610		Ambelokipi Station-Filothei	Local	17.2	49	5:30-23:00 (Mon-Sat); 7:00-21:10 (Sun)		39 (Mon-Fri); 27 (Sat); 13 (Sun)		25-30' (Mon-Fri); 40' (Sat); 60' (Sun)		
610		Ambelokipi Station-Filothei	Local	17.2	49	5:30-23:00 (Mon-Sun)		44 (Mon-Fri); 40 (Sat); 32 (Sun)		25' (Mon-Sat); 30-35' (Sun)		
619		Ano Patisia Station-Nea Filadelfeia-Metamorfosi	Local	11.6	41	5:00-23:25 (Mon-Sat); 7:00-21:25 (Sun)		47 (Mon-Fri); 39 (Sat); 17 (Sun)		25' (Mon-Fri); 30' (Sat); 55' (Sun)		
622	622	Goudi-Ano Galatsi	Central	20.9	63	5:15-23:30 (Mon-Sun)	5:15-23:30 (Mon-Sun)	77 (Note: 39 as 622 and 38 as 815) (Mon-Fri); 67 (Note: 34 as 622 and 33 as 815) (Sat); 57 (Note: 29 as 622 and 28 as 815) (Sun)	103 (Note: 63 as 622 and 40 as 815) (Mon-Fri); 85 (Note: 43 as 622 and 42 as 815) (Sat); 66 (Note: 34 as 622 and 32 as 815) (Sun)	Common Section: 15' (Mon-Sat); 20' (Sun); Individual Sections: 25-30' (Mon-Sat); 35-40' (Sun)	Common Section: 10-15' (Mon-Sun); 622-only Section: 15-20' (Mon-Fri); 25' (Sat); 30-35' (Sun); 815-only Section: 25-30' (Mon-Sat); 35' (Sun)	
622	815	Goudi-Tavros	Central	19.6	62	5:15-23:30 (Mon-Sun)	5:15-23:30 (Mon-Sun)	77 (Mon-Fri); 67 (Sat); 57 (Sun)	103 (Mon-Fri); 85 (Sat); 66 (Sun)	Common Section: 15' (Mon-Sat); 20' (Sun); Individual Sections: 25-30' (Mon-Sat); 35-40' (Sun)	Common Section: 10-15' (Mon-Sun); 622-only Section: 15-20' (Mon-Fri); 25' (Sat); 30-35' (Sun); 815-only Section: 25-30' (Mon-Sat); 35' (Sun)	
623		Ano Patisia Station-Perivolia-Ano Galatsi	Local	10.6	41	6:00-21:10 (Mon-Fri); 7:00-21:10 (Sat)		39 (Mon-Fri); 26 (Sat)		20-25' (Mon-Fri); 35' (Sat)		
624		Ano Patisia Station-Aktimonon-Ano Galatsi	Local	8.5	36	6:20-21:35 (Mon-Fri); 7:20-21:35 (Sat)		39 (Mon-Fri); 26 (Sat)		20-25' (Mon-Fri); 35' (Sat)		
640		Irakleio Local	Local	6.1	27	6:00-23:10 (Mon-Fri); 7:00-21:15 (Sat-Sun)		34 (Mon-Fri); 25 (Sat); 22 (Sun)		30' (Mon-Fri); 35' (Sat); 40' (Sun)		
640		Irakleio Local	Local	6.1	27	6:00-22:30 (Mon-Fri); 6:00-20:00 (Sat-Sun)		33 (Mon-Fri); 28 (Sat-Sun)		30' (Mon-Sun)		
641		Avgi-Agios Nektarios	Local	8.8	34	5:00-0:00 (Mon-Sat); 7:40-22:10 (Sun)		43 (Mon-Fri); 41 (Sat); 26 (Sun)		25-30' (Mon-Sat); 35' (Sun)		
641		Avgi-Agios Nektarios	Local	8.8	34	5:00-0:00 (Mon-Sun)		55 (Mon-Fri); 41 (Sat); 36 (Sun)		20' (Mon-Fri); 25-30' (Sat); 30-35' (Sun)		
642		Irakleio-Agios Nektarios-Pefki	Local	10.3	39	5:15-0:00 (Mon-Sat); 7:45-22:10 (Sun)		47 (Mon-Fri); 41 (Sat); 25 (Sun)		25-30' (Mon-Sat); 35' (Sun)		
642		Nea Ionia-Irakleio-Pefki	Local	10.3	39	5:00-19:40 (Mon-Fri); 5:00-19:20 (Sat-Sun)		46 (Mon-Fri); 32 (Sat); 25 (Sun)		20' (Mon-Fri); 25-30' (Sat); 35' (Sun)		
651	651	Panormou Station-Psychiko	Local	5.1	17	5:25-23:25 (Mon-Sat); 7:00-21:05 (Sun)		39 (Mon-Fri); 42 (Sat); 33 (Sun)		25-30' (Mon-Sun)		
651	651	Panormou Station-Psychiko	Local	5.1	17	5:00-23:30 (Mon-Sun)		61 (Note: 44 as 601 and 17 as 651) (Mon-Fri); 55 (Note: 38 as 601 and 17 as 651) (Sat); 29 (Note: All as 601) (Sun)		Common Section: 15-20' (Mon-Sat); 40' (Sun); 601-only Section: 25' (Mon-Fri); 30' (Sat); 40' (Sun)		
651	601	Kanigos-Nea Filothei-Psychiko	Northern	13.2	42	5:00-23:30 (Mon-Sun)		61 (Mon-Fri); 55 (Sat); 29 (Sun)		Common Section: 15-20' (Mon-Sat); 40' (Sun); 601-only Section: 25' (Mon-Fri); 30' (Sat); 40' (Sun)		
653	653	Panormou Station-Psychiko	Local	12.0	33	5:50-22:55 (Mon-Sat); 7:30-21:15 (Sun)		32 (Mon-Sat); 18 (Sun)		30-35' (Mon-Sat); 45-50' (Sun)		
653	653	Panormou Station-Psychiko	Local	12.0	33	5:45-23:30 (Mon-Sun)		69 (Note: 41 as 603 and 28 as 653) (Mon-Fri); 62 (Note: 34 as 603 and 28 as 653) (Sat); 27 (Note: All as 603) (Sun)		Common Section: 15-20' (Mon-Sat); 40' (Sun); 603-only Section: 25' (Mon-Fri); 30-35' (Sat); 40' (Sun)		
653	603	Kanigos-Psychiko	Northern	17.8	52	5:45-23:30 (Mon-Sun)		69 (Mon-Fri); 62 (Sat); 27 (Sun)		Common Section: 15-20' (Mon-Sat); 40' (Sun); 603-only Section: 25' (Mon-Fri); 30-35' (Sat); 40' (Sun)		

=== 7XX Routes ===
These routes serve Agioi Anargyroi, Acharnes, Ano Liossia, Fyli, Ilion, Kamatero, Peristeri, Petroupoli and Thrakomakedones. Areas that are not part of sector 7 but are or were served by these routes include Agia Varvara (750), Athens (703, 732), Egaleo (703, 731, 750), Haidari (731, 750), Kifisia (721, 734), Korydallos (750), Metamorfosi (724), Nea Filadelfeia (755), Nea Ionia (724), Nikaia (703, 750), Piraeus (703) and Vyronas (732).

7XX Routes
Number		Route	Route Type	Length (in km)	Stops	Operating Hours		Daily Trips		Avg. Frequency		Map
700		Anthoupoli Station-Petroupoli (Agia Triada)	Local	12.6	44	5:05-23:10 (Mon-Sat); 8:20-23:05 (Sun)		51 (Mon-Fri); 44 (Sat); 30 (Sun)		20' (Mon-Fri); 25' (Sat); 30' (Sun)		
700		Agios Antonios Station-Petroupoli	Local		55	5:10-23:00 (Mon-Sat); 8:40-23:00 (Sun)		75 (Mon-Fri); 52 (Sat); 34 (Sun)		15' (Mon-Fri); 20' (Sat); 25' (Sun)		
701	701	Anthoupoli Station-Ilion-Kamatero	Local	15.2	46	5:00-23:00 (Note: Weekdays 9:00-15:00 as 705) (Mon-Sat); 7:20-21:00 (Sun)		43 (Note: 14 as 705) (Mon-Fri); 39 (Sat); 15 (Sun)		25-30' (Mon-Sat); 60' (Sun)		
701	705	Anthoupoli Station-Ag. Anargyroi Sq.-Ilion-Kamatero	Limited Local	17.8	57	5:00-23:00 (Mon-Sat); 7:20-21:00 (Sun)		43 (Mon-Fri); 39 (Sat); 15 (Sun)		25-30' (Mon-Sat); 60' (Sun)		
701	701	Attiki Station-Ilion-Kamatero	Local		61	5:00-22:40 (Mon-Sat); 5:20-22:40 (Sun)		56 (Mon-Fri); 46 (Sat); 34 (Sun)		20-25' (Mon-Sat); 30' (Sun)		
703		Piraeus-Agioi Anargyroi-Agios Eleftherios (via Thivon)	Intermunicipal Western	34.7	108	5:00-23:00 (Mon-Sun)		68 (Mon-Fri); 49 (Sat); 36 (Sun)		15' (Mon-Fri); 20-25' (Sat); 30' (Sun)		
703		Piraeus-Agioi Anargyroi-Agios Eleftherios (via Thivon)	Intermunicipal Western	34.7	108	5:00-23:00 (Mon-Sun)		78 (Mon-Fri); 55 (Sat); 40 (Sun)		15' (Mon-Fri); 20' (Sat); 25-30' (Sun)		
704		Ag. Anargyroi Sq.-Kamatero	Local	13.3	49	5:00-23:20 (Mon-Sat); 7:05-21:30 (Sun)		47 (Mon-Fri); 43 (Sat); 19 (Sun)		20-25' (Mon-Sat); 45-50' (Sun)		
704		Attiki Station-Kamatero	Local	20.5	69	5:00-23:05 (Mon-Sun)		57 (Mon-Fri); 47 (Sat); 35 (Sun)		20-25' (Mon-Sat); 30' (Sun)		
705		Listed as part of route 701, as it is a special variant of the specific route.										
706		Agios Antonios Station-Ilion (via A. Papandreou Ave.)	Local	9.0	28	5:10-23:25 (Mon-Sat); 8:05-23:00 (Sun)		49 (Mon-Fri); 41 (Sat); 25 (Sun)		20-25' (Mon-Fri); 25-30' (Sat); 35' (Sun)		
709	709	Drosoupoli Local	Local	6.1	20	5:00-0:00 (Mon-Fri); 5:15-0:00 (Sat); 5:15-20:40 (Sun)		56 (Mon-Fri); 52 (Sat); 46 (Sun)		20' (Mon-Sun)		
709	709	Drosoupoli Local	Local	6.1	20	5:00-0:00 (Mon-Sun)		96 (Note: 53 as 709 and 43 710) (Mon-Fri); 65 (Note: 37 as 709 and 28 as 710) (Sat); 64 (Note: 37 as 709 and 27 as 710) (Sun)		Loop Total: 10-15' (Mon-Fri); 15-20' (Sat-Sun); Clockwise (709): 20' (Mon-Fri); 30' (Sat-Sun); Anti-clockwise (710): 20-25' (Mon-Fri); 35' (Sat-Sun)		
709	710	Drosoupoli Local	Local		18	5:00-0:00 (Mon-Sun)		96 (Mon-Fri); 65 (Sat); 64 (Sun)		Loop Total: 10-15' (Mon-Fri); 15-20' (Sat-Sun); Clockwise (709): 20' (Mon-Fri); 30' (Sat-Sun); Anti-clockwise (710): 20-25' (Mon-Fri); 35' (Sat-Sun)		
710		Listed as part of route 709, as it was its anti-clockwise counterpart.										
711		Post-2011 route 711 is listed as part of route B12 as they share large common sections.										
711		Pre-2011 route 711 is listed as part of route 712.										
712	712	Acharnes-Erg. Polykatoikies-Ano Liosia	Local	17.0	55	5:00-22:35 (Mon-Fri); 6:30-20:40 (Sat-Sun)		21 (Mon-Fri); 17 (Sat-Sun)		50-55' (Mon-Sun)		
712	711	Acharnes-Zofria	Local	22.9	72	5:00-23:45 (Mon-Sun)		96 (Note: 45 as 711 and 51 as 712) (Mon-Fri); 69 (Note: 34 as 711 and 35 as 712) (Sat-Sun)		Overall: 10' (Mon-Fri); 15' (Sat-Sun); Individual routes: 20-25' (Mon-Fri); 30-35' (Sat-Sun)		
712	712	Acharnes-Erg. Polykatoikies-Ano Liosia (Panorama)	Local	15.5	53	5:00-23:45 (Mon-Sun)		96 (Mon-Fri); 69 (Sat-Sun)		Overall: 10' (Mon-Fri); 15' (Sat-Sun); Individual routes: 20-25' (Mon-Fri); 30-35' (Sat-Sun)		
712	711	Ano Liosia-Erg. Polykatoikies	Local	5.3	15	5:00-23:40 (Mon-Sun)		72 (Note: 37 as 711 and 35 as 712) (Mon-Fri); 66 (Note: 33 as 711 and 33 as 712) (Sat-Sun)		Loop total: 15-20' (Mon-Sun); Individual routes: 30-35' (Mon-Sun)		
712	712	Ano Liosia-Drosoupoli-Erg. Polykatoikies	Local	5.7	16	5:00-23:40 (Mon-Sun)		72 (Mon-Fri); 66 (Sat-Sun)		Loop total: 15-20' (Mon-Sun); Individual routes: 30-35' (Mon-Sun)		
713		Listed as part of route B12, as they shared a large common section.										
714		Listed as part of route A10, as it was a special variant of the specific route.										
717		Listed as part of route 719, as it was a localised variant of the specific route.										
719	719	Larissa Station-Palatiani-Kipoupoli	Local	22.1	75	5:00-23:15 (Mon-Sat); 7:00-21:00 (Sun)		66 (Mon-Fri); 41 (Sat); 22 (Sun)		15' (Mon-Fri); 25-30' (Sat); 40' (Sun)		
719	719	Vathis Sq.-Palatiani	Western		68	5:00-23:10 (Mon-Sat); 5:30-23:10 (Sun)		139 (Note: 86 as 717 and 53 as 719) (Mon-Fri); 97 (Note: 60 as 717 and 37 as 719) (Sat); 77 (Note: 46 as 717 ans 31 as 719) (Sun)		Common Section: 5-10' (Mon-Sat); 15' (Sun); 717-only Section: 10-15' (Mon-Fri); 15-20' (Sat); 20-25' (Sun); 719-only Section: 20' (Mon-Fri); 25-30' (Sat); 35' (Sun)		
719	717	Attiki Station-Palatiani-Petroupoli	Local		61	5:00-23:10 (Mon-Sat); 5:30-23:10 (Sun)		139 (Mon-Fri); 97 (Sat); 77 (Sun)		Common Section: 5-10' (Mon-Sat); 15' (Sun); 717-only Section: 10-15' (Mon-Fri); 15-20' (Sat); 20-25' (Sun); 719-only Section: 20' (Mon-Fri); 25-30' (Sat); 35' (Sun)		
720	720	Attiki Station-Agioi Anargyroi-Anakasa	Local	14.1	42	5:00-23:15 (Mon-Sat); 6:30-21:05 (Sun)		54 (Mon-Fri); 32 (Sat); 19 (Sun)		20' (Mon-Fri); 35' (Sat); 45-50' (Sun)		
720	Γ10	Vathis Sq.-Agioi Anargyroi-Anakasa	Trunk		54	5:00-23:00 (Mon-Sat); 5:30-21:00 (Sun)		46 (Mon-Fri); 42 (Sat); 26 (Sun)		25' (Mon-Sat); 30-35' (Sun)		
720	Γ10	Vathis Sq.-Agioi Anargyroi-Anakasa	Trunk		54	5:00-23:00 (Mon-Sun)		120 (Note: 88 as Γ10 and 32 as 720) (Mon-Fri); 89 (Note: 67 as Γ10 and 21 as 720) (Sat); 50 (Note: all as Γ10) (Sun)		Common Section: 10-15' (Mon-Sat); 20-25' (Sun); Γ10-only Section: 10-15' (Mon-Sat); 20-25' (Sun)		
720	720	Ag. Anargyroi Sq.-Anakasa	Local		33	5:00-23:00 (Mon-Sun)		120 (Mon-Fri); 89 (Sat); 50 (Sun)		Common Section: 10-15' (Mon-Sat); 20-25' (Sun); Γ10-only Section: 10-15' (Mon-Sat); 20-25' (Sun)		
721	721	Kifisia-Acharnes	Local	29.7	80	5:45-22:45 (Mon-Sat); 7:00-22:45 (Sun)		56 (Note: 43 as 721 and 13 as 734) (Mon-Fri); 48 (Note: 35 as 721 and 13 as 734) (Sat); 35 (Note: 22 as 721 and 13 as 734) (Sun)		Common Section: 15-20' (Mon-Sat); 30' (Sun); 721-only Section: 25' (Mon-Fri); 30' (Sat); 45' (Sun); 734-only Section: 70' (Mon-Sun)		
721	734	Acharnes-Nosokomeio Ag. Anargyroi	Limited Local		49	5:45-22:45 (Mon-Sat); 7:00-22:45 (Sun)		56 (Mon-Fri); 48 (Sat); 35 (Sun)		Common Section: 15-20' (Mon-Sat); 30' (Sun); 721-only Section: 25' (Mon-Fri); 30' (Sat); 45' (Sun); 734-only Section: 70' (Mon-Sun)		
721	721	Kifisia-Acharnes	Local	29.7	80	5:45-20:05 (Mon-Fri); 5:55-19:20 (Sat-Sun)		20 (Mon-Fri); 11 (Sat); 10 (Sun)		45' (Mon-Fri); 80' (Sat); 90' (Sun)		
723		Ano Liosia-Fyli	Local	14.3	48	5:00-23:45 (Mon-Sat); 7:00-21:45 (Sun)		63 (Mon-Fri); 45 (Sat); 23 (Sun)		25' (Mon-Fri); 30' (Sat); 45' (Sun)		
724		Nea Ionia-Acharnes (Mesonychi)	Local	17.5	45	5:15-23:10 (Mon-Sat); 8:00-23:10 (Sun)		80 (Mon-Fri); 68 (Sat); 34 (Sun)		10-15' (Mon-Sat); 25-30' (Sun)		
724		Nea Ionia-Acharnes-Thrakomakedones	Local	36.5	128	5:15-23:00 (Mon-Sun)		47 (Mon-Fri); 38 (Sat); 34 (Sun)		20-25' (Mon-Fri); 25-30' (Sat); 30-35' (Sun)		
725		Listed as part of route 726, as they share large common sections.										
726	725	Acharnes (Mesonychi)-Thrakomakedones (Aristotelous Sq.)	Local	16.8	46	5:00-23:10 (Mon-Sat); 7:45-22:45 (Sun)		26 (Note: 14 as 726 and 12 as 725) (Mon-Fri); 25 (Note: 14 as 726 and 11 as 725) (Sat); 15 (Note: 9 as 726 and 6 as 725) (Sun)		Common Section: 40-45' (Mon-Sat); 60' (Sun); 725-only Section: 90' (Mon-Fri); 100' (Sat); 160' (Sun); 726-only Section: 80' (Mon-Sat); 100' (Sun)		
726	726	Acharnes (Mesonychi)-Thrakomakedones (Vouno)	Local	23.5	75	5:00-23:10 (Mon-Sat); 7:45-22:45 (Sun)		26 (Mon-Fri); 25 (Sat); 15 (Sun)		Common Section: 40-45' (Mon-Sat); 60' (Sun); 725-only Section: 90' (Mon-Fri); 100' (Sat); 160' (Sun); 726-only Section: 80' (Mon-Sat); 100' (Sun)		
727		Ag. Paraskevi-Ag. Konstantinos-Mesonychi	Local	14.8	48	5:00-23:00 (Mon-Sat); 7:15-21:30 (Sun)		38 (Note: 2 extended to Olympiako Chorio) (Mon-Fri); 28 (Sat); 21 (Sun)		30' (Mon-Fri); 40' (Sat-Sun)		
727		Acharnes-Mesonychi	Local	5.5	19	5:30-22:30 (Mon-Fri); 5:30-22:05 (Sat); 7:00-22:25 (Sun)		34 (Mon-Fri); 22 (Sat); 12 (Sun)		30' (Mon-Fri); 45-50' (Sat); 85' (Sun)		
727		Acharnes-Mesonychi	Local	5.5	19	5:30-22:30 (Mon-Fri); 5:30-22:05 (Sat-Sun)		37 (Mon-Fri); 32 (Sat-Sun)		25-30' (Mon-Fri); 30-35' (Sat-Sun)		
728		Acharnes-Ag. Petros-Ag. Ioannis-Platonas	Local	15.2	50	5:00-23:30 (Mon-Sat); 6:40-21:45 (Sun)		39 (Note: 1 extended to Larissa Station) (Mon-Fri); 28 (Sat); 21 (Sun)		25-30' (Mon-Fri); 40' (Sat); 45' (Sun)		
728		Acharnes-Platonas	Local		31	5:45-23:30 (Mon-Sat); 6:45-21:00 (Sun)		36 (Mon-Fri); 27 (Sat); 21 (Sun)		30' (Mon-Fri); 40-45' (Sat-Sun)		
728		Acharnes-Platonas	Local		31	5:45-23:30 (Mon-Sun)		43 (Mon-Fri); 34 (Sat); 32 (Sun)		25' (Mon-Fri); 30-35' (Sat-Sun)		
729		Acharnes-Agios Konstantinos	Local		55	5:00-23:00 (Mon-Sat); 6:45-21:25 (Sun)		35 (Mon-Fri); 25 (Sat); 22 (Sun)		30' (Mon-Fri); 45' (Sat); 40' (Sun)		
729		Acharnes-Agios Konstantinos	Local		55	5:00-23:00 (Mon-Sun)		44 (Mon-Fri); 34 (Sat); 26 (Sun)		25' (Mon-Fri); 30-35' (Sat); 40-45' (Sun)		
730		Zoodochos Pigi-Agios Antonios Station-Lofos Axiomatikon	Local	17.1	62	5:00-23:35 (Mon-Sat); 6:30-23:00 (Sun)		48 (Note: 1 extended to Omonoia) (Mon-Fri); 35 (Sat); 28 (Sun)		20-25' (Mon-Fri); 30' (Sat); 35' (Sun)		
730		Omonoia-Zoodochos Pigi	Western			5:30-23:30 (Mon-Sat); 6:00-23:30 (Sun)		53 (Mon-Fri); 48 (Sat); 39 (Sun)		20-25' (Mon-Sat); 25-30' (Sun)		
731		Anthoupoli-Anthoupoli Station-Attiko Nosokomeio-Dasos	Local	22.0	74	5:00-23:30 (Mon-Sat); 6:35-21:40 (Sun)		38 (Mon-Fri); 32 (Sat); 22 (Sun)		30' (Mon-Fri); 35' (Sat); 40-45' (Sun)		
731		Agios Antonios Station-Anthoupoli	Local		30	5:00-23:10 (Mon-Sun)		64 (Mon-Fri); 54 (Sat); 42 (Sun)		15-20' (Mon-Sat); 25' (Sun)		
731		Anthoupoli-Ano Petralona	Western			5:00-23:00 (Mon-Sun)		50 (Mon-Fri); 42 (Sat); 38 (Sun)		20-25' (Mon-Sat); 30' (Sun)		
732		Akadimia-Agios Fanourios-Ilion	Western	17.3	55	5:00-23:15 (Mon-Sun)		81 (Mon-Fri); 64 (Sat); 47 (Sun)		10-15' (Mon-Fri); 15-20' (Sat); 20-25' (Sun)		
732		Agios Fanourios-Zoodochos Pigi	Eastern		88	5:00-23:15 (Mon-Sun)		96 (Mon-Fri); 78 (Sat); 44 (Sun)		10' (Mon-Fri); 15' (Sat); 25' (Sun)		
732		Agios Fanourios-Zoodochos Pigi	Eastern		88	5:00-23:15 (Mon-Sun)		141 (Mon-Fri); 103 (Sat); 76 (Sun)		5-10' (Mon-Sat); 15' (Sun)		
732		Chalkokondyli-Agios Fanourios	Western			5:00-23:40 (Mon-Sat); 5:30-23:40 (Sun)		116 (Mon-Fri); 98 (Sat); 63 (Sun)		10' (Mon-Sat); 15-20' (Sun)		
733		Acharnes-Ano Liosia	Local		39	5:00-22:00 (Mon-Fri); 5:30-22:00 (Sat); 7:00-21:15 (Sun)		25 (Mon-Fri); 24 (Sat); 21 (Sun)		40-45' (Mon-Sun)		
733		Acharnes-Ano Liosia	Local		39	5:00-22:00 (Mon-Sat); 6:10-22:00 (Sun)		46 (Mon-Fri); 27 (Sat); 23 (Sun)		20-25' (Mon-Fri); 40-45' (Sat-Sun)		
734		Listed as part of route 721, as they share large common sections.										
735		Kato Patisia Station-Zefyri-Acharnes	Local	25.2	76	5:00-23:15 (Mon-Sat); 6:30-21:45 (Sun)		48 (Mon-Fri); 36 (Sat); 24 (Sun)		20-25' (Mon-Fri); 30' (Sat); 40' (Sun)		
735		Kato Patisia Station-Zefyri-Acharnes	Local	25.2	76	5:00-23:20 (Mon-Sun)		51 (Mon-Fri); 43 (Sat); 39 (Sun)		20-25' (Mon-Sat); 25-30' (Sat-Sun)		
736		Zofria-Ag Nikolaos-Zefyri	Local	8.9	27	7:50-22:45 (Mon-Sun)		26 (Mon-Sat)		35' (Mon-Sat)		
737		Kentro-Drosoupoli-Limni	Local	6.7	22	6:15-21:20 (Mon-Sat)		37 (Mon-Sat)		25' (Mon-Sat)		
740		Olympiako Chorio-Acharnes-SKA-Ag. Anna	Local	29.1	91	5:00-23:00 (Mon-Sat); 6:00-21:15 (Sun)		50 (Note: 1 extended to OAKA) (Mon-Fri); 34 (Sat); 24 (Sun)		20-25' (Mon-Fri); 30-35' (Sat); 40' (Sun)		
740		Kamatero-Ag. Nikolaos	Local		56							
741		Kamatero-Gerovouno	Local		38							
746		Ano Liosia-ODDY	Local		22	5:00-20:00 (Mon-Sat)		30 (Mon-Fri); 31 (Sat)		30' (Mon-Sat)		
747		Anthoupoli Station-Panorama-Petroupoli	Local	15.0	51	5:00-22:45 (Mon-Sat); 7:00-21:00 (Sun)		43 (Note: 3 via Amaxostasio Petroupolis) (Mon-Fri); 32 (Sat); 16 (Sun)		25' (Mon-Fri); 35' (Sat); 55' (Sun)		
747		Attiki Station-Panorama-Petroupoli	Local		70	5:00-22:30 (Mon-Sat); 5:30-22:30 (Sun)		45 (Mon-Fri); 37 (Sat); 29 (Sun)		20-25' (Mon-Fri); 30' (Sat); 35' (Sun)		
748		Peristeri Station-Anthoupoli-Chrysoupoli	Local	8.9	33	5:10-23:05 (Mon-Sat); 7:00-21:10 (Sun)		33 (Mon-Fri); 29 (Sat); 21 (Sun)		30-35' (Mon-Fri); 35-40' (Sat); 40-45' (Sun)		
748		Agios Antonios Station-Anthoupoli-Chrysoupoli	Local		37	5:10-23:05 (Mon-Sat); 7:00-21:10 (Sun)		33 (Mon-Fri); 29 (Sat); 21 (Sun)		30-35' (Mon-Fri); 35-40' (Sat); 40-45' (Sun)		
748		Acharnes-Ano Liosia (via Agios Ioannis)	Local			6:00-22:20 (Mon-Fri); 6:00-20:30 (Sat-Sun)		17 (Mon-Fri); 15 (Sat-Sun)		60' (Mon-Sun)		
749		Ano Liosia Station-Oikismos Gennimata	Local	10.7	35	5:00-23:10 (Mon-Fri); 6:15-22:35 (Sat); 6:25-21:15 (Sun)		29 (Mon-Fri); 27 (Sat); 23 (Sun)		35-40' (Mon-Sun)		
749		Ano Liosia Station-Oikismos Gennimata	Local	10.7	35	5:00-23:30 (Mon-Sat); 7:50-23:00 (Sun)		68 (Mon-Fri); 43 (Sat); 30 (Sun)		15' (Mon-Fri); 25' (Sat); 30' (Sun)		
750		Attiko Nosokomeio-Egaleo Station-Nikaia	Intermunicipal Western	26.2	92	5:00-23:20 (Mon-Sat); 7:40-23:20 (Sun)		48 (Mon-Fri); 32 (Sat); 18 (Sun)		20-25' (Mon-Fri); 35' (Sat); 50-55' (Sun)		
750		Agios Antonios Station-Egaleo-Nikaia	Intermunicipal Western			5:00-23:15 (Mon-Sat); 7:45-23:15 (Sun)		53 (Mon-Fri); 48 (Sat); 32 (Sun)		20-25' (Mon-Sat); 25-30' (Sun)		
752	752	Acharnes-Agios Ioannis-Agios Petros	Local	12.4	43	5:20-23:40 (Mon-Sat); 7:05-22:00 (Sun)		43 (Mon-Fri); 28 (Sat); 22 (Sun)		25' (Mon-Fri); 40-45' (Sat-Sun)		
752	752	Acharnes-Agios Ioannis-Agios Petros	Local	12.4	43	5:30-23:40 (Mon-Sat); 7:35-21:30 (Sun)	5:00-23:40 (Mon-Sat); 5:30-23:40 (Sun)	56 (Note: 29 as 752 and 27 as 753) (Mon-Fri); 46 (Note: 23 as 752 and 23 as 753) (Sat); 40 (Note: 20 as 752 and 20 as 753) (Sun)	67 (Note: 33 as 752 and 34 as 753) (Mon-Fri); 58 (Note: 28 as 752 and 30 as 753) (Sat); 48 (Note: 24 as 752 and 24 as 753) (Sun)	Loop Total: 20' (Sun-Fri); 25' (Sat); Individual Sections: 35-40' (Mon-Fri); 45-50' (Sat); 40-45' (Sun)	Loop Total: 15' (Mon-Fri); 20-25' (Sat-Sun); Individual Sections: 35' (Mon-Fri); 40' (Sat); 45' (Sun)	
752	753	Acharnes-Agios Petros-Agios Ioannis	Local		37	5:30-23:40 (Mon-Sat); 7:35-21:30 (Sun)	5:00-23:40 (Mon-Sat); 5:30-23:40 (Sun)	56 (Mon-Fri); 46 (Sat); 40 (Sun)	67 (Mon-Fri); 58 (Sat); 48 (Sun)	Loop Total: 20' (Sun-Fri); 25' (Sat); Individual Sections: 35-40' (Mon-Fri); 45-50' (Sat); 40-45' (Sun)	Loop Total: 15' (Mon-Fri); 20-25' (Sat-Sun); Individual Sections: 35' (Mon-Fri); 40' (Sat); 45' (Sun)	
753		Listed as part of route 753, as its anticlockwise counterpart.										
755	755	Kato Patisia Station-Kokkinos Mylos-Acharnes	Local	26.4	90	5:00-23:25 (Mon-Sat); 5:15-23:25 (Sun)		76 (Note: 20 as 755Β) (Mon-Fri); 56 (Note: 14 as 755Β) (Sat); 37 (Note: 11 as 755Β) (Sun)		Common Sections: 15' (Mon-Fri); 20' (Sat); 30' (Sun); 755B-only Section: 50-55' (Mon-Fri); 75' (Sat); 95' (Sun)		
755	755B	Kato Patisia Station-Kokkinos Mylos-Acharnes (via Charavgi)	Local		88	5:00-23:25 (Mon-Sat); 5:15-23:25 (Sun)		76 (Mon-Fri); 56 (Sat); 37 (Sun)		Common Sections: 15' (Mon-Fri); 20' (Sat); 30' (Sun); 755B-only Section: 50-55' (Mon-Fri); 75' (Sat); 95' (Sun)		

=== 8XX Routes ===
These routes serve Agia Varvara, Aspropyrgos, Drapetsona, Egaleo, Elefsina, Erythres, Haidari, Keratsini, Korydallos, Magoula, Mandra, Megara, Nea Peramos, Nikaia, Oinoi, Perama, Rentis, Tavros and Vilia. Areas that are not part of sector 7 but are or were served by these routes include Acharnes (878, 879), Agioi Anargyroi (892), Ano Liosia (878, 879), Athens (813, 815, 856, 891), Dafni (856), Ilion (892), Kallithea (860), Moschato (860), Palaio Faliro (860), Peristeri (821, 822, 823, 840, 891, 892), Piraeus (838), Ymittos (856) and Zografou (815).

8XX Routes
Number		Route	Route Type	Length (in km)	Stops	Operating Hours		Daily Trips	Avg. Frequency	Map
800		Nikaia Station-Nikaia	Local	10.6	41	5:05-23:00 (Mon-Sat); 7:30-21:40 (Sun)		43 (Mon-Fri); 35 (Sat); 20 (Sun)	25' (Mon-Fri); 30' (Sat); 45' (Sun)	
800		Piraeus-Nikaia	Western	14.5	54	5:00-22:50 (Mon-Sat); 7:30-21:40 (Sun)		39 (Mon-Fri); 30 (Sat); 17 (Sun)	25-30' (Mon-Fri); 35' (Sat); 50-55' (Sun)	
800		Piraeus-Nikaia	Western	14.5	54	5:00-22:55 (Mon-Sat); 7:30-22:55 (Sun)		67 (Mon-Fri); 50 (Sat); 37 (Sun)	15' (Mon-Fri); 20' (Sat); 25' (Sun)	
802		Piraeus-Dasos	Western	28.7	96	5:00-0:00 (Mon-Sun)	43 (Mon-Fri); 34 (Sat); 27 (Sun)	25' (Mon-Fri); 35' (Sat); 40-45' (Sun)		
803		Piraeus-Dasos	Western	26.9	94	5:00-23:10 (Mon-Sat); 6:30-21:25 (Sun)	25 (Mon-Fri); 21 (Sat); 18 (Sun)	45' (Mon-Fri); 50-55' (Sat-Sun)		
804		Piraeus-Dafni	Western	25.0	78	5:00-23:00 (Mon-Sun)	38 (Mon-Fri); 26 (Sat); 25 (Sun)	25-30' (Mon-Fri); 40-45' (Sat); 45' (Sun)		
805		Aspropyrgos-Neoktista	Limited Local	17.8	49	5:00-19:30 (Mon-Sat); 6:45-19:30 (Sun)	12 (Mon-Sat); 10 (Sun)	75' (Mon-Sat); 80' (Sun)		
806		Korydallos Station-Karavas-Schisto	Local	14.5	54	5:00-23:20 (Mon-Sun)	55 (Mon-Fri); 43 (Sat); 35 (Sun)	20' (Mon-Fri); 25' (Sat); 30-35' (Sun)		
807		Egaleo Station-Ano Korydallos	Local	17.2	61	5:15-23:40 (Mon-Sun)	55 (Mon-Fri); 43 (Sat); 35 (Sun)	20' (Mon-Fri); 25' (Sat); 30-35' (Sun)		
809		Korydallos Station-Nikaia Station-Schisto	Local	15.4	60	5:00-23:00 (Mon-Sat); 5:20-23:00 (Sun)	56 (Note: 1 extended to Piraeus) (Mon-Fri); 45 (Sat); 33 (Sun)	20' (Mon-Fri); 25' (Sat); 30-35' (Sun)		
809		Piraeus-Korydallos-Schisto	Western	21.1	76	5:15-23:00 (Mon-Sun)	46 (Mon-Fri); 34 (Sat); 23 (Sun)	20-25' (Mon-Fri); 30-35' (Sat); 45-50' (Sun)		
810		Korydallos Station-Schisto	Local	12.7	42	5:00-23:30 (Mon-Sat); 5:30-23:30 (Sun)	57 (Mon-Fri); 45 (Sat); 33 (Sun)	20' (Mon-Fri); 25' (Sat); 30-35' (Sun)		
810		Piraeus-Korydallos-Schisto	Western	19.4	69	5:00-23:30 (Mon-Sun)	47 (Mon-Fri); 34 (Sat); 23 (Sun)	25' (Mon-Fri); 30-35' (Sat); 50' (Sun)		
811		Agia Marina Station-Haidari	Local	12.4	45	5:00-23:15 (Mon-Sat); 7:00-21:35 (Sun)	55 (Note: 1 extended to Koumoundourou Sq.) (Mon-Fri); 50 (Sat); 21 (Sun)	20' (Mon-Fri); 20-25' (Sat); 40-45' (Sun)		
812		Koumoundourou Sq.-Haidari	Western		79	5:00-23:00 (Mon-Sat); 5:30-23:00 (Sun)	55 (Mon-Fri); 41 (Sat-Sun)	20' (Mon-Fri); 25' (Sat-Sun)		
813		Averof-Proussis	Western	20.6	70	5:00-0:00 (Mon-Sun)	61 (Mon-Fri); 53 (Sat); 36 (Sun)	15-20' (Mon-Fri); 20' (Sat); 30-35' (Sun)		
814		Piraeus-Karavas-Schisto	Western	20.8	79	5:00-23:00 (Mon-Sun)	55 (Mon-Fri); 47 (Sat); 33 (Sun)	20' (Mon-Fri); 20-25' (Sat); 30-35' (Sun)		
815		Listed as part of route 622, as they share a large common section.								
816		Listed as part of route 219, as it is a special variant of the specific route.								
817		Elefsina-Mandra	Local	20.5	60	5:20-23:00 (Mon-Sat); 7:00-21:40 (Sun)	47 (Mon-Fri); 33 (Sat); 18 (Sun)	20-25' (Mon-Fri); 30-35' (Sat); 50' (Sun)		
818		Limani Peramatos-Ano Perama	Local	7.8	35	4:40-0:00 (Mon-Fri); 5:00-0:00 (Sat); 7:00-21:10 (Sun)		61 (Mon-Fri); 49 (Sat); 28 (Sun)	20-25' (Mon-Sat); 30' (Sun)	
818		Limani Peramatos-Ano Perama	Local	7.8	35	4:40-0:00 (Mon-Fri); 5:00-0:00 (Sat); 5:15-0:00 (Sun)		113 (Mon-Fri); 62 (Sat); 47 (Sun)	10' (Mon-Fri); 15-20' (Sat); 25' (Sun)	
819		Perama-Nekrotafeio Schistou	Local	17.4	49	7:30-17:40 (Mon-Fri); 9:30-16:00 (Sat-Sun)	12 (Mon-Fri); 8 (Sat-Sun)	50-55' (Mon-Sun)		
820		Nikaia Station-Keratsini-Drapetsona	Local	9.9	37					
820		Egaleo Station-Keratsini	Local							
821		Agios Antonios Station-Agia Anastasia	Local	6.0	21					
822		Agios Antonios Station-Nea Zoi	Local	8.2	31	5:00-0:15 (Mon-Fri); 5:10-0:15 (Sat-Sun)	122 (Mon-Fri); 100 (Sat); 46 (Sun)	10' (Mon-Sat); 25' (Sun)		
823		Agios Antonios Station-Agios Vasileios	Local	8.7	31	5:00-23:45 (Mon-Fri); 5:10-23:45 (Sat); 6:45-21:15 (Sun)	76 (Mon-Fri); 48 (Sat); 23 (Sun)	15' (Mon-Fri); 20-25' (Sat); 40' (Sun)		
824		Piraeus-Agios Antonios-Neapoli	Western	16.5	64					
825		Piraeus-Agios Antonios-Neapoli	Western	16.6	63					
826		Piraeus-Agios Minas	Western	16.9	59	5:00-23:50 (Mon-Sat); 6:30-23:20 (Sun)	75 (Mon-Fri); 44 (Sat); 26 (Sun)	15' (Mon-Fri); 25' (Sat); 40' (Sun)		
827		Piraeus-Nikaia Station-Aspra Chomata	Western	12.6	44	5:00-23:00 (Mon-Sat); 6:40-21:00 (Sun)	42 (Mon-Fri); 34 (Sat); 19 (Sun)	25' (Mon-Fri); 30-35' (Sat); 45-50' (Sun)		
827		Piraeus-G' Nekrotafeio-Aspra Chomata	Western		47	5:00-23:00 (Mon-Sat); 6:40-20:30 (Sun)	30 (Mon-Fri); 20 (Sat); 15 (Sun)	35-40' (Mon-Fri); 55' (Sat); 60' (Sun)		
828		Piraeus-Thivon-Nikaia Station	Western	18.1	59	5:25-22:25 (Mon-Fri); 5:25-22:30 (Sat); 7:05-21:15 (Sun)	27 (Mon-Fri); 26 (Sat); 15 (Sun)	40' (Mon-Sat); 60' (Sun)		
828		Piraeus-Aspra Chomata-G' Nekrotafeio	Western		44	5:25-22:30 (Mon-Sat); 7:10-21:00 (Sun)	29 (Mon-Fri); 19 (Sat); 15 (Sun)	35' (Mon-Fri); 55' (Sat); 60' (Sun)		
829		PADA Alsos Egaleo-Egaleo Station-PADA Archaios Elaionas	Scholar Local	10.4	36	5:20-22:30 (Mon-Fri); 5:20-21:20 (Sat)	66 (Mon-Fri); 34 (Sat)	15' (Mon-Fri); 30' (Sat)		
830		Korydallos Station-Agia Varvara	Local	10.7	40	5:00-23:00 (Mon-Sat); 7:30-22:10 (Sun)	59 (Mon-Fri); 50 (Sat); 20 (Sun)	15-20' (Mon-Fri); 20-25' (Sat); 45' (Sun)		
830		Piraeus-Agia Varvara	Western		54	5:00-23:00 (Mon-Sat); 7:30-22:00 (Sun)	50 (Mon-Fri); 37 (Sat); 22 (Sun)	20-25' (Mon-Fri); 30' (Sat); 40' (Sun)		
831		Piraeus-Egaleo	Western	24.1	81	5:00-23:00 (Mon-Sat); 6:30-22:05 (Sun)	74 (Mon-Fri); 60 (Sat); 36 (Sun)	15' (Mon-Fri); 15-20' (Sat); 25' (Sun)		
832		Piraeus-Evgeneia-Haravgi	Western	13.3	55	5:15-22:45 (Mon-Sat); 7:00-21:35 (Sun)	37 (Mon-Fri); 31 (Sat); 24 (Sun)	30' (Mon-Fri); 35' (Sat); 35-40' (Sun)		
833		Piraeus-Haravgi-Evgeneia	Western	13.0	54	5:00-23:10 (Mon-Sat); 6:30-22:20 (Sun)	38 (Mon-Fri); 32 (Sat); 25 (Sun)	30' (Mon-Fri); 35' (Sat); 35-40' (Sun)		
837		Agia Marina Station-Agia Varvara Station-Agia Varvara	Local	10.7	39	5:00-23:45 (Mon-Sat); 5:15-23:45 (Sun)	52 (Mon-Fri); 40 (Sat); 25 (Sun)	20' (Mon-Fri); 25-30' (Sat); 45' (Sun)		
838		Omonoia-Rentis-Palaia Kokkinia-Piraeus	Western	25.8	71	5:30-21:00 (Mon-Fri); 5:35-19:40 (Sat); 7:20-19:55 (Sun)	29 (Mon-Fri); 15 (Sat); 10 (Sun)	30-35' (Mon-Fri); 60' (Sat); 80' (Sun)		
838		Omonoia-Rentis-Palaia Kokkinia	Western		59	5:30-21:00 (Mon-Fri); 5:35-19:40 (Sat); 7:20-19:55 (Sun)	29 (Mon-Fri); 15 (Sat); 10 (Sun)	30-35' (Mon-Fri); 60' (Sat); 80' (Sun)		
839		Omonoia-Ano Agia Varvara	Western		67	5:30-23:40 (Mon-Sat); 5:45-23:40 (Sun)	76 (Mon-Fri); 54 (Sat); 45 (Sun)	15' (Mon-Fri); 20' (Sat); 25' (Sun)		
840		Omonoia-Lofos Axiomatikon	Western		68	5:45-20:50 (Mon-Sun)	28 (Mon-Fri); 23 (Sat); 19 (Sun)	30-35' (Mon-Fri); 40' (Sat); 50' (Sun)		
841		Nikaia Station-Perama	Local	17.7	63	5:20-23:15 (Mon-Sun)	54 (Mon-Fri); 36 (Sat); 30 (Sun)	20' (Mon-Fri); 30' (Sat); 35-40' (Sun)		
842		Korydallos Station-Perama	Local	23.4	81	5:00-23:35 (Mon-Sun)	55 (Mon-Fri); 37 (Sat); 31 (Sun)	20' (Mon-Fri); 30' (Sat); 35-40' (Sun)		
843		Piraeus-Perama	Western	22.2	77	4:40-0:00 (Mon-Sun)	103 (Mon-Fri); 79 (Sat); 55 (Sun)	10' (Mon-Fri); 15' (Sat); 20' (Sun)		
845	845	Piraeus-Elefsina (via Thivon)	Western	50.2	118	5:00-0:00 (Mon-Sun)	57 (Note: 1 as 801) (Mon-Fri); 39 (Sat); 31 (Sun)	20' (Mon-Fri); 30' (Sat); 35-40' (Sun)		
845	801	Piraeus-Palaska (Note: One-way route. The bus runs only from Piraeus to Palaska and not vice versa.)	Special Western		57	5:00-0:00 (Mon-Sun)	57 (Mon-Fri); 39 (Sat); 31 (Sun)	20' (Mon-Fri); 30' (Sat); 35-40' (Sun)		
846		Nikaia Station-Neapoli	Local	7.5	30	5:05-23:15 (Mon-Sat); 7:10-21:40 (Sun)	57 (Mon-Fri); 43 (Sat); 24 (Sun)	20' (Mon-Fri); 25' (Sat); 35-40' (Sun)		
846		Piraeus-Neapoli	Western		44	5:00-22:55 (Mon-Sat); 7:45-21:15 (Sun)	32 (Mon-Fri); 29 (Sat); 16 (Sun)	35' (Mon-Fri); 35-40' (Sat); 55' (Sun)		
847		Piraeus-Neapoli	Western		45	5:20-23:20 (Mon-Fri); 5:25-23:20 (Sat); 7:15-22:00 (Sun)	32 (Mon-Fri); 29 (Sat); 17 (Sun)	35' (Mon-Fri); 35-40' (Sat); 55' (Sun)		
851		Koumoundourou Sq.-Neapoli	Western							
852		Egaleo Station-Neapoli	Local	15.9	58	5:00-23:20 (Mon-Sat); 6:45-20:50 (Sun)	40 (Mon-Fri); 37 (Sat); 19 (Sun)	25-30' (Mon-Fri); 30' (Sat); 45' (Sun)		
855		Psari-Aspropyrgos-Lofos Kyrillou	Local	25.3	66	5:15-23:10 (Mon-Sat); 5:00-23:10 (Sun)	53 (Mon-Fri); 41 (Sat); 29 (Sun)	20' (Mon-Fri); 25' (Sat); 35-40' (Sun)		
856		Dafni-Ymittos-Egaleo	Southern	27.5	88	5:00-23:15 (Mon-Sat); 6:00-22:20 (Sun)	74 (Mon-Fri); 51 (Sat); 30 (Sun)	15' (Mon-Fri); 20' (Sat); 30-35' (Sun)		
859		Piraeus-Dexamenes-Neos Molos Drapetsonas	Western	17.7	42	5:40-22:00 (Mon-Sat); 6:30-20:45 (Sun)	31 (Mon-Fri); 21 (Sat); 18 (Sun)	30-35' (Mon-Fri); 50' (Sat-Sun)		
859		Piraeus-Dexamenes	Western		35	5:40-22:00 (Mon-Fri); 5:55-20:30 (Sat); 6:30-20:55 (Sun)	48 (Mon-Fri); 40 (Sat); 22 (Sun)	20' (Mon-Fri); 20-25' (Sat); 40' (Sun)		
860		Palaio Faliro-Gen. Kratiko Nikaias-Schisto	Intermunicipal Western	40.2	112	5:00-22:10 (Mon-Sat); 7:45-22:10 (Sun)	31 (Mon-Fri); 25 (Sat); 20 (Sun)	30-35' (Mon-Fri); 40' (Sat); 45' (Sun)		
861	861	Elefsina-Mandra (Oik. Titan)	Local	39.3	78	5:40-22:30 (Mon-Fri); 5:40-20:50 (Sat); 6:30-19:45 (Sun)	17 (Note: 4 as 861B) (Mon-Fri); 13 (Sat); 11 (Sun)	60' (Mon-Fri); 65-70' (Sat); 70' (Sun)		
861	861Β	Elefsina-Mandra-Vilia-Erythres	Local	100.9	120	5:40-22:30 (Mon-Fri); 5:40-20:50 (Sat); 6:30-19:45 (Sun)	17 (Mon-Fri); 13 (Sat); 11 (Sun)	60' (Mon-Fri); 65-70' (Sat); 70' (Sun)		
862		Paralia-Ano Elefsina	Local	14.2	38	5:00-22:50 (Mon-Fri); 6:00-20:15 (Sat); 7:35-20:45 (Sun)	24 (Mon-Fri); 19 (Sat); 18 (Sun)	45' (Mon-Sun)		
863		Elefsina-Thriasio Nosokomeio-Mandra	Local	27.3	87	5:30-23:30 (Mon-Sun)	49 (Mon-Fri); 40 (Sat); 27 (Sun)	20-25' (Mon-Fri); 25-30' (Sat); 40' (Sun)		
864		Elefsina-VIPE Magoulas	Special Local		45	8 special rush-hour trips during weekdays.				
866		Agia Marina Station-Aspropyrgos	Local	31.2	70					
868		Agia Marina Station-Thriasio Nosokomeio-Mandra	Local	43.8	82					
870		Agia Marina Station-Megara	Local	77.4	87					
871	871	Piraeus-Elefsina (via Ethnikis Antistaseos Ave.)	Western	41.9	87	5:35-22:45 (Mon-Fri); 5:40-22:35 (Sat); 5:45-20:50 (Sun)	22 (Note: 5 as 871T) (Mon-Fri); 13 (Sat); 11 (Sun)	45' (Mon-Fri); 80' (Sat); 90' (Sun)		
871	871T	Piraeus-Schisto	Western		50	5:35-22:45 (Mon-Fri); 5:40-22:35 (Sat); 5:45-20:50 (Sun)	22 (Mon-Fri); 13 (Sat); 11 (Sun)	45' (Mon-Fri); 80' (Sat); 90' (Sun)		
872		Piraeus-Nekrotafeio Schistou	Western		50	5:35-18:00 (Mon-Fri); 5:35-17:40 (Sat); 5:35-17:30 (Sun)	19 (Mon-Fri); 21 (Sat-Sun)	35-40' (Mon-Sun)		
875		Piraeus-Neos Molos Drapetsonas	Western	15.7	52	5:35-20:00 (Mon-Fri); 5:40-19:35 (Sat); 7:30-19:15 (Sun)	12 (Mon-Fri); 13 (Sat); 9 (Sun)	75' (Mon-Fri); 70' (Sat); 90' (Sun)		
876	876	Agia Marina Station-Elefsina	Local	32.3	59	5:00-0:00 (Mon-Sun)	71 (Note: 1 as 890 1 extended to Koumoundourou Sq. 1 extended to Mandra) (Mon-Fri); 55 (Note: 1 extended to Koumoundourou Sq. 1 extended to Mandra) (Sat); 42 (Sun)	15' (Mon-Fri); 20' (Sat); 25-30' (Sun)		
876	890	Agia Marina Station-Nafpigeia Skaramaga	Special Local		10	5:00-0:00 (Mon-Sun)	71 (Mon-Fri); 55 (Sat); 42 (Sun)	15' (Mon-Fri); 20' (Sat); 25-30' (Sun)		
878		Acharnes-Elefsina	Intermunicipal Western	49.5	115	5:00-22:00 (Mon-Sat); 6:00-21:35 (Sun)	23 (Note: 3 extended to Mesonychi) (Mon-Fri); 16 (Note: 2 extended to Mesonychi) (Sat); 13 (Note: 1 extended to Mesonychi) (Sun)	45' (Mon-Fri); 65' (Sat); 75' (Sun)		
879		Acharnes-Thriasio Nosokomeio-Elefsina	Intermunicipal Western	60.0	148	6:00-22:45 (Mon-Fri); 6:25-22:45 (Sat-Sun)	21 (Mon-Fri); 14 (Sat); 11 (Sun)	50' (Mon-Fri); 75' (Sat); 90' (Sun)		
881		Elefsina-Aspropyrgos-Roupaki	Local	29.3	72	5:20-22:15 (Mon-Fri); 5:30-21:40 (Sat); 6:55-21:35 (Sun)	23 (Note: 6 via Nekrotafeio Asprorpyrgou) (Mon-Fri); 20 (Sat); 19 (Note: 5 via Nekrotafeio Asprorpyrgou) (Sun)	45-50' (Mon-Sun)		
891		Attiki Station-Peristeri-Egaleo-Agia Varvara	Intermunicipal Western	20.0	60	5:30-22:35 (Mon-Sat); 6:00-22:35 (Sun)	27 (Mon-Fri); 25 (Sat); 22 (Sun)	40-45' (Mon-Sat); 45-50' (Sun)		
892		Ilion-Agioi Anargyroi-Haidari-Agia Varvara	Intermunicipal Western	33.5	103	5:30-23:35 (Mon-Sat); 6:40-22:35 (Sun)	29 (Mon-Fri); 27 (Sat); 18 (Sun)	35-40' (Mon-Fri); 40' (Sat); 55' (Sun)		

=== 9XX Routes ===
These routes serve Kallithea, Moschato and Piraeus. Areas that are not part of sector 9 but are or were served by these routes include Athens (910, 914), Nikaia (900, 909), Rentis (914) and Tavros (914).

9XX Routes
Number		Route	Route Type	Length (in km)	Stops	Operating Hours		Daily Trips	Avg. Frequency	Map
900		Piraeus-Nikaia Station	Western	7.7	31					
901		Neo Faliro Station-Statistiki Ypiresia	Local	2.5	5	6:00-20:50 (Mon-Fri)		86 (Mon-Fri)	10' (Mon-Fri)	
904		Karaiskaki Sq.-Piraeus Station-Freattyda	Central	9.1	33	5:00-23:10 (Mon-Sat); 6:40-23:00 (Sun)		60 (Mon-Fri); 47 (Sat); 37 (Sun)	15-20' (Mon-Fri); 20-25' (Sat); 25-30' (Sun)	
904		Karaiskaki Sq.-Piraeus Station-Freattyda	Central	9.1	33	5:00-23:10 (Mon-Sun)		103 (Mon-Fri); 80 (Sat); 69 (Sun)	10-15' (Mon-Sun)	
905		Karaiskaki Sq.-Chatzikyriakeio	Central	7.8	28					
906		Karaiskaki Sq.-Kallipoli	Central	6.7	24	5:00-23:30 (Mon-Sat); 7:00-23:10 (Sun)	77 (Mon-Fri); 51 (Sat); 26 (Sun)	15' (Mon-Fri); 20-25' (Sat); 35-40' (Sun)		
909		Agios Vasileios-Agia Sofia-Geniko Kratiko Nikaias	Central	18.5	72	5:00-23:20 (Mon-Sun)	67 (Mon-Fri); 50 (Sat); 39 (Sun)	15' (Mon-Fri); 20-25' (Sat); 25-30' (Sun)		
910		Syngrou/Fix Station-Tzitzifies	Local	10.7	33	5:00-23:40 (Mon-Sat); 7:00-21:20 (Sun)	65 (Mon-Fri); 39 (Sat); 20 (Sun)	15' (Mon-Fri); 25-30' (Sat); 45' (Sun)		
911	911	Kallithea Station-Idryma Tyflon	Local	6.8	21	6:35-20:35 (Mon-Fri)	20 (Note: 2 as 911A) (Mon-Fri)	45' (Mon-Fri)		
911	911A	Kallithea Station-Idryma Tyflon-PE Notiou Tomea	Special Local	14.4	22	6:35-20:35 (Mon-Fri)	20 (Mon-Fri)	45' (Mon-Fri)		
913		Kallithea Station-El. Venizelos Station	Local	13.7	32					
914		Listed as part of route 049 as they share a large common section.								
915		Lofos Vokou-Profitis Ilias	Central	11.1	46	5:00-23:25 (Mon-Sun)	87 (Mon-Fri); 57 (Sat); 40 (Sun)	10-15' (Mon-Fri); 20' (Sat); 25-30' (Sun)		

=== Trolleybus Routes ===
These routes were operated by ILPAP until 2011. Most of these lines run on the same path as lines of the old Athens Tramway. The routes for a brief period formed part of the three-digit OASA numerical system as 001 to 020 respectively. This was discontinued in 1999, when route 21 was created, to avoid confusion with the existing bus route 021.

Trolleybus Routes
Number		Route	Route Type	Length (in km)	Stops	Operating Hours	Daily Trips	Avg. Frequency	Map
1		Attiki Sq.-Kallithea-Moschato	Trolleybus	23.3	70	5:00-23:35 (Mon-Sun)	45 (Mon-Fri); 35 (Sat); 31 (Sun)	25' (Mon-Fri); 30-35' (Sat); 35-40' (Sun)	
1		Attiki Sq.-Kallithea-Moschato	Trolleybus	23.3	70	4:25-23:35 (Mon-Sun)	78 (Mon-Fri); 55 (Sat); 37 (Sun)	15' (Mon-Fri); 20' (Sat); 30' (Sun)	
2		Ano Kypseli-Pangrati-Kaisariani	Trolleybus	16.5	53	6:25-23:25 (Mon-Sun)	59 (Mon-Fri); 44 (Sat); 31 (Sun)	15-20' (Mon-Fri); 20-25' (Sat); 35' (Sun)	
2		Kypseli-Pangrati-Kaisariani	Trolleybus	14.7	45	5:45-23:25 (Mon-Sat); 5:55-23:25 (Sun)	110 (Mon-Fri); 83 (Sat); 48 (Sun)	10' (Mon-Fri); 10-15' (Sat); 20-25' (Sun)	
4		Ano Kypseli-Agios Artemios-Agios Ioannis Station	Trolleybus	18.2	58	5:00-23:40 (Mon-Sun)	64 (Mon-Fri); 48 (Sat); 34 (Sun)	15-20' (Mon-Fri); 20-25' (Sat); 30-35' (Sun)	
4		Ano Kypseli-Plastira Sq.-Agios Artemios	Trolleybus	15.8	50	4:25-23:40 (Mon-Sun)	117 (Mon-Fri); 91 (Sat); 52 (Sun)	10' (Mon-Fri); 10-15' (Sat); 20-25' (Sun)	
9		Zappeio-Ano Kypseli	Trolleybus	10.2	30	5:10-23:35 (Mon-Fri); 5:10-23:30 (Sat-Sun); 5:00-23:30 (Sun)	106 (Mon-Fri); 81 (Sat); 53 (Sun)	10' (Mon-Fri); 10-15' (Sat); 20' (Sun)	
3		Nea Filadelfeia-Ano Patisia-Neo Psychiko	Trolleybus	24.8	75	5:00-23:05 (Mon-Sun)	91 (Mon-Fri); 61 (Sat); 46 (Sun)	10-15' (Mon-Fri); 15-20' (Sat); 25' (Sun)	
3		Nea Fildelfeia-Ano Patisia-Girokomeio	Trolleybus	22.9	68	5:35-22:40 (Mon-Sun)	103 (Mon-Fri); 73 (Sat); 48 (Sun)	10' (Mon-Fri); 15' (Sat); 20' (Sun)	
3		Ano Patisia-Girokomeio	Trolleybus	18.7	53	5:25-23:20 (Mon-Sun)	136 (Mon-Fri); 109 (Sat); 80 (Sun)	5-10' (Mon-Fri); 10' (Sat); 10-15' (Sun)	
5		Lambrini-Syntagma Sq.-Tzitzifies	Trolleybus	28.1	88	5:30-23:00 (Mon-Sun)	77 (Mon-Fri); 52 (Sat); 40 (Sun)	10-15' (Mon-Fri); 20' (Sat); 25' (Sun)	
5		Lambrini-Syntagma Sq.-Tzitzifies	Trolleybus	28.1	88	5:05-23:00 (Mon-Fri); 5:10-0:20 (Sat-Sun)	97 (Mon-Fri); 85 (Sat); 59 (Sun)	10' (Mon-Fri); 10-15' (Sat); 20' (Sun)	
6		Ippokratous-Nea Filadelfeia-Kosmas Aitolos	Trolleybus	18.5	62	5:40-0:00 (Mon-Sat); 6:10-0:00 (Sun)	79 (Mon-Fri); 52 (Sat); 37 (Sun)	15' (Mon-Fri); 20' (Sat); 30' (Sun)	
6		Ippokratous-Nea Filadelfeia-Kosmas Aitolos	Trolleybus	18.5	62	5:40-0:00 (Mon-Sat); 6:10-0:00 (Sun)	98 (Mon-Fri); 84 (Sat); 62 (Sun)	10' (Mon-Fri); 10-15' (Sat); 15-20' (Sun)	
7		Zappeio-Ano Patisia	Trolleybus	12.5	34				
7		Panepistimiou-Alexandras Ave.	Trolleybus	7.3	20	6:30-20:55 (Mon-Fri); 7:25-20:15 (Sat); 7:25-20:00 (Sun)	36 (Mon-Fri); 27 (Sat); 24 (Sun)	25' (Mon-Fri); 30' (Sat); 30-35' (Sun)	
7		Panepistimiou-Alexandras Ave.	Trolleybus	7.3	20	5:35-23:45 (Mon-Sat); 5:45-23:25 (Sun)	72 (Mon-Fri); 61 (Sat); 56 (Sun)	15' (Mon-Fri); 15-20' (Sat); 20' (Sun)	
8		Akadimias-Alexandras Ave.	Trolleybus	7.5	20	6:30-20:00 (Mon-Fri); 8:00-22:55 (Sat-Sun)	33 (Mon-Fri); 28 (Sat); 24 (Sun)	25' (Mon-Fri); 25-30' (Sat); 30-35' (Sun)	
8		Akadimias-Alexandras Ave.	Trolleybus	7.5	20	5:30-23:10 (Mon-Fri); 5:30-23:50 (Sat-Sun); 8:00-22:55 (Sun)	66 (Mon-Fri); 60 (Sat); 40 (Sun)	15' (Mon-Fri); 15-20' (Sat); 20-25' (Sun)	
10		Chalandri-Tzitzifies	Trolleybus	29.5	86	5:15-22:50 (Mon-Sun)	59 (Mon-Fri); 48 (Sat); 36 (Sun)	15-20' (Mon-Fri); 20-25' (Sat); 30' (Sun)	
10		Chalandri-Tzitzifies	Trolleybus	29.5	86	4:05-1:00 (Mon-Fri); 4:00-22:45 (Sat); 4:20-22:45 (Sun)	113 (Mon-Fri); 69 (Sat); 54 (Sun)	10' (Mon-Fri); 15' (Sat); 20' (Sun)	
10		Stadiou-Nea Smyrni-Palaio Faliro	Trolleybus	16.8		4:30-23:30 (Mon-Fri); 4:25-23:35 (Sat); 5:00-23:30 (Sun)	114 (Mon-Fri); 92 (Sat); 63 (Sun)	10' (Mon-Fri); 10-15' (Sat); 15-20' (Sun)	
11		Ano Patisia-Neo Pangrati-Nea Elvetia	24h Trolleybus	20.1	63	24h (Mon-Sun)	85 (Mon-Fri); 64 (Sat); 51 (Sun)	15' (Mon-Fri); 20' (Sat); 25-30' (Sun); 30' (Night)	
11		Koliatsou-Neo Pangrati-Nea Elvetia	24h Trolleybus	17.4	55	24h (Mon-Sun)	134 (Mon-Fri); 89 (Sat); 69 (Sun)	10' (Mon-Fri); 15' (Sat); 20' (Sun); 25' (Night)	
12		Zappeio-Peristeri (Agios Ierotheos)	Trolleybus	18.0	58	5:40-00:00 (Mon-Fri); 6:05-0:00 (Sat-Sun)	78 (Mon-Fri); 49 (Sat); 33 (Sun)	15' (Mon-Fri); 20-25' (Sat); 30-35' (Sun)	
12		Zappeio-Peristeri (Agios Ierotheos)	Trolleybus	18.0	58	4:25-0:00 (Mon-Thu); 4:25-2:50 (Fri-Sat); 4:55-0:40 (Sun)	169 (Mon-Thu); 177 (Fri); 143 (Sat); 90 (Sun)	5-10' (Mon-Fri); 10' (Sat); 10-15' (Sun)	
13		Lambrini-Kanigos Sq.-Neo Psychiko	Trolleybus	24.7	76	5:00-23:15 (Mon-Sat); 5:30-23:15 (Sun)	66 (Mon-Fri); 49 (Sat); 36 (Sun)	15' (Mon-Fri); 20-25' (Sat); 30' (Sun)	
13		Lambrini-Kanigos Sq.-Neo Psychiko	Trolleybus	24.7	76	4:05-0:25 (Mon-Sat); 4:30-0:25 (Sun)	110 (Mon-Fri); 76 (Sat); 47 (Sun)	10' (Mon-Fri); 15' (Sat); 25' (Sun)	
14		Lambrini-Alexandras Ave.-Girokomeio	Trolleybus	19.4	65	5:00-23:15 (Mon-Sat); 5:00-22:20 (Sun)	79 (Mon-Fri); 52 (Sat); 38 (Sun)	15' (Mon-Fri); 20' (Sat); 25-30' (Sun)	
14		Papadiamanti Sq.-Alexandras Ave.-Neo Psychiko	Trolleybus	18.2	59	5:15-22:30 (Mon-Fri); 5:15-0:10 (Sat-Sun)	110 (Mon-Fri); 92 (Sat); 69 (Sun)	10' (Mon-Fri); 10-15' (Sat); 15' (Sun)	
15		El. Venizelou-Dikastiria-Petralona	Trolleybus	17.2	49	5:45-23:00 (Mon-Sat); 8:05-23:00 (Sun)	48 (Mon-Fri); 41 (Sat); 25 (Sun)	20-25' (Mon-Fri); 25' (Sat); 35-40' (Sun)	
15		Zappeio-El. Venizelou	Trolleybus	10.8	29	4:30-23:15 (Mon-Sat); 4:25-23:10 (Sun)	117 (Mon-Fri); 82 (Sat); 52 (Sun)	10' (Mon-Fri); 10-15' (Sat); 20-25' (Sun)	
16		Piraeus-Agios Ioannis Rentis	Trolleybus	8.5	29	5:00-23:40 (Mon-Sat); 5:30-23:20 (Sun)	55 (Mon-Fri); 50 (Sat); 38 (Sun)	20' (Mon-Fri); 20-25' (Sat); 25-30' (Sun)	
16		Piraeus-Agios Ioannis Rentis	Trolleybus	8.5	29	4:30-23:40 (Mon-Fri); 4:30-0:40 (Sat); 4:35-23:40 (Sun)	96 (Mon-Fri); 87 (Sat); 70 (Sun)	10-15' (Mon-Fri); 15' (Sat-Sun)	
17		Piraeus-Agios Georgios	Trolleybus	10.6	43	5:00-23:30 (Mon-Sun)	67 (Mon-Fri); 51 (Sat); 36 (Sun)	15' (Mon-Fri); 20-25' (Sat); 30' (Sun)	
17		Piraeus-Agios Georgios	Trolleybus	10.6	43	4:30-0:20 (Mon-Sat); 4:30-0:15 (Sun)	122 (Mon-Fri); 77 (Sat); 66 (Sun)	10' (Mon-Fri); 15' (Sat); 15-20' (Sun)	
18		Mouseio-Chalandri (via Ethnikis Antistaseos)	Trolleybus	16.9	51	5:00-23:35 (Mon-Sat); 5:30-23:35 (Sun)	32 (Mon-Fri); 26 (Sat); 21 (Sun)	35' (Mon-Fri); 45' (Sat); 55' (Sun)	
18		Mouseio-Chalandri (via Ethnikis Antistaseos)	Trolleybus	16.9	51	4:30-23:40 (Mon-Fri); 4:30-0:45 (Sat); 4:50-23:40 (Sun)	68 (Mon-Fri); 58 (Sat); 41 (Sun)	15-20' (Mon-Fri); 20' (Sat); 25-30' (Sun)	
19	19	Mouseio-Chalandri Station (via Sidera)	Special Trolleybus	23.8	73	5:20-0:00 (Mon-Fri); 5:30-0:00 (Sat); 6:05-0:00 (Sun)	32 (Mon-Fri); 26 (Sat); 21 (Sun)	35' (Mon-Fri); 45' (Sat); 50-55' (Sun)	
19	19B	Mouseio-Chalandri (via Sidera)	Trolleybus	17.7	53	5:20-0:00 (Mon-Fri); 5:30-0:00 (Sat); 6:05-0:00 (Sun)	32 (Mon-Fri); 26 (Sat); 21 (Sun)	35' (Mon-Fri); 45' (Sat); 50-55' (Sun)	
20		Drapetsona-Neo Faliro	Trolleybus	14.7	56	5:05-23:55 (Mon-Sun)	64 (Mon-Fri); 42 (Sat); 35 (Sun)	15-20' (Mon-Fri); 25-30' (Sat); 30-35' (Sun)	
20		Drapetsona-Neo Faliro	Trolleybus	14.7	56	4:30-23:55 (Mon-Sun)	114 (Mon-Fri); 90 (Sat); 70 (Sun)	10' (Mon-Fri); 10-15' (Sat); 15' (Sun)	
21		Omonoia-Petrou Ralli-Nikaia	Trolleybus	17.0	55	5:00-23:30 (Mon-Sun)	110 (Mon-Fri); 65 (Sat); 48 (Sun)	10' (Mon-Fri); 15-20' (Sat); 20-25' (Sun)	
21		Omonoia-Petrou Ralli-Nikaia	Trolleybus	17.0	55	4:20-0:00 (Mon-Sat); 5:30-0:00 (Sun)	152 (Mon-Fri); 118 (Sat); 74 (Sun)	5-10' (Mon-Fri); 10' (Sat); 15' (Sun)	
22		Petralona-Peiraios Str.-Omonoia	Trolleybus	7.3	23	5:05-23:20 (Mon-Sat); 5:10-23:20 (Sun)	84 (Mon-Fri); 64 (Sat); 47 (Sun)	10-15' (Mon-Fri); 15-20' (Sat); 20-25' (Sun)	
23		Petralona-Koukaki-Omonoia	Trolleybus	7.7	21	5:00-23:50 (Mon-Sun)	84 (Mon-Fri); 64 (Sat); 47 (Sun)	10-15' (Mon-Fri); 15-20' (Sat); 20-25' (Sun)	
24		Agios Antonios Station-Ilion-Petroupoli	Local Trolleybus	10.7	34	5:00-23:20 (Mon-Sat); 5:30-23:20 (Sun)	50 (Mon-Fri); 40 (Sat); 29 (Sun)	20-25' (Mon-Fri); 25-30' (Sat); 35-40' (Sun)	
25		Agios Antonios Station-Ilion-Kamatero	Local Trolleybus	14.3	49	5:30-23:15 (Mon-Sat); 7:25-22:35 (Sun)	39 (Mon-Fri); 35 (Sat); 27 (Sun)	25-30' (Mon-Fri); 30' (Sat); 35' (Sun)	

=== Other Special Routes ===
These routes do not operate on regular daytime trips and do not have large common sections with regular daytime routes.

Other Special Routes
Number	Route	Length (in km)	Stops	Notes
031	Goudi-Attiko Nosokomeio			Created to transport students of the School of Medicine to Attiko Hospital.
032	Goudi-Marasleio			Created to transport students of the Marasleio School.
031	Goudi-Attiko Nosokomeio			Created to transport students of the School of Medicine to Attiko Hospital.
400	Piraeus-Doukissis Plakentias Station			Night replacement of Line 3
500	Piraeus-Kifisia			Night replacement of Line 1
702	Kamatero local			Created to transport students of Kamatero public schools.
790	Glyfada-Peristeri			Night replacement of Line 2
801	Piraeus-Palaska			Created to transport soldiers stationed at Palaska Naval Base.
836	Koumoundourou Sq.-Palaska			Created to transport soldiers stationed at Palaska Naval Base.
865	Amaxostasio Votanikou-Mandra			Special evening route.
890	Agia Marina Station-Nafpigeia Skaramanga			Created to transport personnel working at the Skaramangas Shipyard.
912	Neo Faliro Station-KEPA			
X14	Syntagma-Kifisia			Night route.

== Before 2000 ==
Before 2000
Number	Route	Route Type
B2	Akadimia-Glyfada	Trunk
Γ4	Akadimia-Argyroupoli-Nekrotafeio Glyfadas	Trunk
E5	Akadimia-Agia Paraskevi	Express Trunk
E51	Akadimia-Stavros	Express Trunk
A18	Omonoia-Nikaia	Trunk
019	Piraeus-Anatolikos & Dytikos Aerolimenas	Southern Airport Express
035	Omonoia-Ano Kypseli (Kerkyras)	Central
036	Ano Kypseli-Doiranis (-1981)	Central
054	Vathi Sq.-Lambrini	Northern
055	Omonoia-Dikastiria	Central
057	Agios Georgios-Lofos Skouze	Central
091	Omonoia-Anatolikos Aerolimenas	Southern Airport Express
092	Omonoia-Dytikos Aerolimenas	Southern Airport Express
093	Dytikos Aerolimenas-Anatolikos Aerolimenas	Southern Airport Express
101	Piraeus-Anatolikos Aerolimenas	Southern
115	Glyfada-Vouliagmeni-Varkiza	Local
138	Glyfada-Kavouri-Vouliagmeni	Local
150	Omonoia-Syntagma-Monastiraki	Central
180	Zappeion-Varkiza	Southern Summer Express
190	Piraeus-Varkiza	Southern Summer Express
201	Akadimia-Argyroupoli	Southern
209	Monastiraki-Metamorfosi	Eastern
210	Monastiraki-Nea Elvetia	Eastern
228	Omonoia-Dafni	Southern
242	Polytechneio-Polytechneioupoli	Eastern
301	Agia Paraskevi-Anthousa	Local
324	Agia Paraskevi-Kantza-Pallini	Local
350	Zappeion-Artemis	Eastern Summer Express
402	Metamorfosi-Polydroso	Local
404	Metamorfosi-Katechaki	Local
406	Agia Paraskevi-Kontopefko-Gerakas	Local
410	Ano Melissia-Marousi Station	Local
423	Chalandri-Nea Penteli	Local
442	Chalandri-Vrilissia-Penteli	Local
602	Nea Ionia-Kalogreza	Local
605	Vathi Sq.-Perissos	Northern
621	Athens-Ano Galatsi	Northern
704	Marni-Kamatero	Western
732	Vathi Sq.-Agios Fanourios	Western
742	Acharnes-Monomati	Local
748	Acharnes-Agios Ioannis	Local
811	Omonoia-TEI Peiraia	Western
841	Agios Ioannis Rentis-Trito Nekrotafeio	Local
850	Omonoia-Kato Petralona	Western
861	Ano Elefsina-Paralia-Aerodromio	Local
3	Patisia-Erythros Stavros	Trolleybus
5	Papadiamanti Sq.-Koukaki-Tzitzifies	Trolleybus
9	Ano Kypseli-Petralona	Trolleybus
