= List of Athens Metro stations =

A map of Athens Metro lines currently in operation

The Athens Metro is a rapid transit system serving the Athens urban area and parts of East Attica. Since 10 October 2022, there are 66 stations on three different lines. 62 of the 66 stations are owned and operated by Urban Rail Transport S.A. (STASY): three stations (Pallini, Paiania–Kantza and Koropi) are owned by the Hellenic Railways Organisation and operated by Hellenic Train, while the Athens Airport station is owned and operated by the airport authority that owns and manages Athens International Airport.

The opening of the second phase of the Line 3 extension towards Piraeus, in October 2022, added two new stations to the network (Dimotiko Theatro and Maniatika), bringing the total to 66.

== Overview ==
All Athens Metro trains and stations are accessible for wheelchair users. However, Transport for Athens (OASA) advises wheelchair users of Line 1 to travel in the leading car, and to ask staff to deploy a portable boarding ramp (located on the platforms) at Agios Nikolaos, Monastiraki and Omonia, because the curved platforms at these stations leave a significant gap between the train and the platform.

== Stations ==
Listed for each of the 66 stations are the lines serving it, the local authority in which it is located, and the date when it opened. The spelling of the station names on this table, in English and Greek, are according to the signage. Interchange stations are counted once: they are currently five of them, at Attiki and Omonia (Lines 1 and 2), Monastiraki and Piraeus (Lines 1 and 3), and Syntagma (Lines 2 and 3).

¤	Limited service of one train every 36 minutes
†	Terminal station
#	Interchange station

Station English	Station Greek	Image	Lines	Municipality	Opened	Interchanges and notes	Ref.
Agia Marina	Αγία Μαρίνα		Athens Metro Line 3	Agia Varvara	14 December 2013		
Aghia Paraskevi	Αγία Παρασκευή		Athens Metro Line 3	Chalandri	30 December 2010	This station opened after the extension to Chalandri.	
Agia Varvara	Αγία Βαρβάρα		Athens Metro Line 3	Agia Varvara	7 July 2020		
Aghios Antonios	Άγιος Αντώνιος		Athens Metro Line 2	Peristeri	9 August 2004		
Aghios Dimitrios; Alexandros Panagoulis	Άγιος Δημήτριος; Αλέξανδρος Παναγούλης		Athens Metro Line 2	Agios Dimitrios; Ilioupoli	5 June 2004		
Aghios Eleftherios	Άγιος Ελευθέριος		Athens Metro Line 1	Athens	4 August 1961	This station opened after the extension to Ano Patisia.	
Aghios Ioannis	Άγιος Ιωάννης		Athens Metro Line 2	Athens	15 November 2000		
Aghios Nikolaos	Άγιος Νικόλαος		Athens Metro Line 1	Athens	12 February 1956		
Akropoli	Ακρόπολη		Athens Metro Line 2	Athens	15 November 2000		
Alimos	Άλιμος		Athens Metro Line 2	Alimos	26 July 2013		
Ambelokipi	Αμπελόκηποι		Athens Metro Line 3	Athens	28 January 2000		
Ano Patissia	Άνω Πατήσια		Athens Metro Line 1	Athens	12 February 1956		
Anthoupoli^{†}	Ανθούπολη		Athens Metro Line 2	Peristeri	6 April 2013		
Argyroupoli	Αργυρούπολη		Athens Metro Line 2	Elliniko-Argyroupoli	26 July 2013		
Athens International Airport^{¤†#}	Διεθνής Αερολιμένας Αθηνών		Athens Metro Line 3	Spata-Artemida	30 July 2004	Interchange with the Athens Suburban Railway. This station is operated by Athens International Airport S.A.	
Attiki^{#}	Αττική		Athens Metro Lines 1 and 2	Athens	30 June 1949 (Note: The Line 2 station opened on 28 January 2000.)		
Dafni	Δάφνη		Athens Metro Line 2	Agios Dimitrios; Dafni-Ymittos	15 November 2000		
Dimotiko Theatro^{†#}	Δημοτικό Θέατρο		Athens Metro Line 3	Piraeus	10 October 2022	Interchange with the Athens Tram at Dimarcheio.	
Doukissis Plakentias (Note: Doukissis Plakentias is signed as "Plakentias" (Greek: Πλακεντίας) on the Athens Suburban Railway.)^{†#}	Δουκίσσης Πλακεντίας		Athens Metro Line 3	Chalandri	28 July 2004	Interchange with the Athens Suburban Railway at Plakentias.	
Egaleo	Αιγάλεω		Athens Metro Line 3	Aigaleo	26 May 2007		
Eleonas	Ελαιώνας		Athens Metro Line 3	Aigaleo	26 May 2007		
Elliniko^{†}	Ελληνικό		Athens Metro Line 2	Elliniko-Argyroupoli	26 July 2013		
Ethniki Amyna	Εθνική Άμυνα		Athens Metro Line 3	Athens; Papagou-Cholargos	28 January 2000		
Evangelismos	Ευαγγελισμός		Athens Metro Line 3	Athens	28 January 2000		
Halandri	Χαλάνδρι		Athens Metro Line 3	Chalandri	24 July 2004		
Holargos	Χολαργός		Athens Metro Line 3	Chalandri; Papagou-Cholargos	23 July 2010	This station opened after the extension to Chalandri.	
Ilioupoli; Grigoris Lambrakis	Ηλιούπολη; Γρηγόρης Λαμπράκης		Athens Metro Line 2	Agios Dimitrios; Ilioupoli	26 July 2013	This station originally opened without the Grigoris Lambrakis qualifier: the station adopted the current name on 22 May 2015.	
Iraklio	Ηράκλειο		Athens Metro Line 1	Irakleio	4 March 1957		
Irini	Ειρήνη		Athens Metro Line 1	Marousi	3 September 1982	This station opened after the extension to Kifissia.	
Kallithea	Καλλιθέα		Athens Metro Line 1	Kallithea; Moschato-Tavros	1 July 1928	This station opened after the original route.	
KAT	ΚΑΤ		Athens Metro Line 1	Kifissia; Marousi	27 March 1989	This station opened after the extension to Kifissia.	
Katehaki	Κατεχάκη		Athens Metro Line 3	Athens	28 January 2000		
Kato Patissia	Κάτω Πατήσια		Athens Metro Line 1	Athens	12 February 1956		
Kerameikos	Κεραμεικός		Athens Metro Line 3	Athens	26 May 2007	Construction of Kerameikos was suspended in 1998 and later relocated, due to an archaeological dispute.	
Kifissia^{†}	Κηφισιά		Athens Metro Line 1	Kifissia	10 August 1957		
Koropi^{¤#}	Κορωπί		Athens Metro Line 3	Kropia	10 July 2006 (Note: Pallini, Paiania–Kantza and Koropi opened on 30 July 2004, for Athens Suburban Railway trains only.)	Interchange with the Athens Suburban Railway. This station is operated by GAIAOSE.	
Korydallos	Κορυδαλλός		Athens Metro Line 3	Korydallos	7 July 2020		
Larissa Station^{#}	Σταθμός Λαρίσης		Athens Metro Line 2	Athens	28 January 2000 (Note: The opening date applies to the Line 2 station only.)	Interchange with the Athens Suburban Railway and Hellenic Train at Athens.	
Maniatika	Μανιάτικα		Athens Metro Line 3	Piraeus	10 October 2022		
Marousi	Μαρούσι		Athens Metro Line 1	Marousi	1 September 1957	This station opened after the extension to Kifissia.	
Megaro Moussikis	Μέγαρο Μουσικής		Athens Metro Line 3	Athens	28 January 2000		
Metaxourghio	Μεταξουργείο		Athens Metro Line 2	Athens	28 January 2000		
Monastiraki^{#}	Μοναστηράκι		Athens Metro Lines 1 and 3	Athens	17 May 1895 (Note: The Line 3 station opened on 22 April 2003.)	Some platform signs on Line 1 use the station's Katharevousa name, "Monastirion" (Μοναστήριον).	
Moschato	Μοσχάτο		Athens Metro Line 1	Moschato-Tavros	9 August 1882	This station opened after the original route.	
Nea Ionia	Νέα Ιωνία		Athens Metro Line 1	Nea Ionia	14 March 1956		
Neo Faliro^{#}	Νέο Φάληρο		Athens Metro Line 1	Piraeus	9 August 1882 resited 1887	Interchange with the Athens Tram at Gipedo Karaiskaki (towards Piraeus) or Stadio Irinis & Filias (towards Glyfada). This station opened after the original route.	
Neos Kosmos^{#}	Νέος Κόσμος		Athens Metro Line 2	Athens	15 November 2000	Interchange with the Athens Tram.	
Nerantziotissa (Note: Nerantziotissa is signed as "Neratziotissa" (Greek: Νερατζιώτισσα) on the Athens Suburban Railway.)^{#}	Νεραντζιώτισσα		Athens Metro Line 1	Marousi	6 August 2004	Interchange with the Athens Suburban Railway. This station opened after the extension to Kifissia.	
Nikaia	Νίκαια		Athens Metro Line 3	Nikaia-Agios Ioannis Rentis	7 July 2020		
Nomismatokopio	Νομισματοκοπείο		Athens Metro Line 3	Agia Paraskevi; Chalandri	2 September 2009	This station opened after the extension to Chalandri.	
Omonia^{#}	Ομόνοια		Athens Metro Lines 1 and 2	Athens	17 May 1895 resited 21 July 1930		
Paiania–Kantza^{¤#}	Παιανία - Κάντζα		Athens Metro Line 3	Paiania	10 July 2006	Interchange with the Athens Suburban Railway. This station is operated by GAIAOSE.	
Pallini^{¤#}	Παλλήνη		Athens Metro Line 3	Pallini	September 2006	Interchange with the Athens Suburban Railway. This station is operated by GAIAOSE.	
Panepistimio	Πανεπιστήμιο		Athens Metro Line 2	Athens	28 January 2000		
Panormou	Πανόρμου		Athens Metro Line 3	Athens	28 January 2000		
Pefkakia	Πευκάκια		Athens Metro Line 1	Nea Ionia	5 July 1956	This station opened after the extension to Nea Ionia.	
Perissos	Περισσός		Athens Metro Line 1	Nea Ionia	14 March 1956		
Peristeri	Περιστέρι		Athens Metro Line 2	Peristeri	6 April 2013		
Petralona	Πετράλωνα		Athens Metro Line 1	Athens	22 November 1954	This station opened after the original route.	
Piraeus^{†#}	Πειραιάς (Note: Formerly signed as Πειραιεύς (Peiraieus): one surviving sign with such spelling can be found above the western entrance.)		Athens Metro Lines 1 and 3	Piraeus	27 February 1869 (Note: The Line 3 station opened on 10 October 2022.)	Interchange with the Athens Suburban Railway.	
Sepolia	Σεπόλια		Athens Metro Line 2	Athens	28 January 2000		
Sygrou–Fix^{#}	Συγγρού–Φίξ		Athens Metro Line 2	Athens	15 November 2000	Interchange with the Athens Tram at Fix.	
Syntagma^{#}	Σύνταγμα		Athens Metro Lines 2 and 3	Athens	28 January 2000	Interchange with the Athens Tram.	
Tavros; Eleftherios Venizelos	Ταύρος; Ελευθέριος Βενιζέλος		Athens Metro Line 1	Moschato-Tavros	6 February 1989	This station opened after the original route.	
Thissio	Θησείο		Athens Metro Line 1	Athens	27 February 1869	This station was the original eastern terminus of Line 1, from 1869 to 1895: a train depot is next to the station.	
Victoria	Βικτώρια		Athens Metro Line 1	Athens	1 March 1948		

=== Station layouts ===
Most Athens Metro stations have two tracks and two side platforms. The following stations have a different layout:

Station(s)	Layout	Notes	Ref.
Kifissia	Bay platform	Kifissia has a second track on the western side of the platform, and is in regular passenger use.	
Agios Dimitrios, Athens Airport, Egaleo, Ethniki Amyna, Koropi, Monastiraki (Line 3), Paiania–Kantza, Pallini, Tavros	Island platform	Athens Airport has two island platforms, but Metro trains only use the middle track.	
Irini, Neo Faliro, Omonia (Line 1), Piraeus (Line 1)	Spanish solution	Irini has a third track to the south, for terminating trains only. Neo Faliro has a third track to the north, and is not in regular passenger use.	

=== Park and ride facilities ===
There are six park and ride facilities: four are managed by STASY, and two by Elliniko Metro.

Station	Spaces	Structure	Ref.
Agia Marina	383	Indoor, multistorey	
Chalandri	280	Outdoor	
Doukissis Plakentias	630	Outdoor	
Kerameikos	270	Indoor, underground	
Nomismatokopio	604	Indoor, underground	
Syngrou–Fix	642	Indoor, underground	

The 240-space car park for Katechaki, operated by Elliniko Metro, was closed due to the construction of Line 4.

== Future stations ==
Construction of the first stage of Line 4 began on 22 June 2021: the original target completion date was 2030, but as of April 2026 it has been delayed to 2032. The project will create fourteen new stations and make Evangelismos an interchange station with Line 3. Akadimia will be a standalone station, but there will be a direct tunnel connection with Line 2 at Panepistimio, under Patriarch Gregory V Street. All the stations will be underground. Except for Evangelismos, the spelling of the station names on this table, in English and Greek, are according to Elliniko Metro (the infrastructure manager of the Athens Metro).

Station English	Station Greek	Image	Lines	Municipality	Planned opening	Interchanges and notes	Ref.
Akadimia^{#}	Ακαδημία		Athens Metro Line 4	Athens	2032	Interchange with Line 2 at Panepistimio.	
Alexandras	Αλεξάνδρας		Athens Metro Line 4	Athens	2032		
Alsos Veikou^{†}	Άλσος Βεΐκου	—N/a	Athens Metro Line 4	Galatsi	2032	Also known as "Veikou" (Βεΐκου) for short, the station was previously known as "Tralleon" (Τράλλεων) until November 2005.	
Dikastiria	Δικαστήρια		Athens Metro Line 4	Athens	2032		
Elikonos	Ελικώνος		Athens Metro Line 4	Galatsi	2032	Elikonos was a late addition to Section A of Line 4: the residents of the area petitioned Elliniko Metro to add a second station in Kypseli, because of the long distance between Galatsi and Kypseli: Elliniko Metro struggled to find an appropriate location for the extra station because they feared that the elevation of the platforms would be around 50 metres (160 feet) deep. On 16 December 2017, Elliniko Metro agreed to build Elikonos: according to the April 2018 technical drawing, the station will still be one of the deepest on the Metro, at around 35 metres (115 feet).	
Evangelismos^{#}	Ευαγγελισμός		Athens Metro Lines 3 and 4	Athens	2032 (Note: The Line 3 station opened on 28 January 2000.)	As of May 2023, this is the only station where construction works have not yet started.	
Exarcheia	Εξάρχεια		Athens Metro Line 4	Athens	2032		
Galatsi	Γαλάτσι		Athens Metro Line 4	Galatsi	2032		
Goudi^{†}	Γουδή		Athens Metro Line 4	Zografou	2032		
Ilissia	Ιλίσια		Athens Metro Line 4	Zografou	2032		
Kaissariani	Καισαριανή		Athens Metro Line 4	Kaisariani	2032		
Kolonaki	Κολωνάκι		Athens Metro Line 4	Athens	2032		
Kypseli	Κυψέλη		Athens Metro Line 4	Athens	2032		
Panepistimioupoli	Πανεπιστημιούπολη		Athens Metro Line 4	Kaisariani	2032	Panepistimioupoli was originally proposed in 2014 as "Near East" (Νήαρ Ήστ), at a different location.	
Zografou	Ζωγράφου		Athens Metro Line 4	Zografou	2032		

== See also ==
- List of Athens Tram stops
- List of Thessaloniki Metro stations
- Greek railway stations
