= Elliniko Metro =

Greek public company

Coordinates: 37.99460°N 23.77715°E

Elliniko Metro S.A.
- Native name: Ελληνικό Μετρό
- Romanized name: Elliniko Metro
- Company type: Anonymi Etaireia (SA)
- Founded: 18 July 1991; 34 years ago in Athens, Greece
- Headquarters: Mesogeion Avenue 191–193; 115 25 Athens, Greece
- Areas served: Greater Athens; Thessaloniki
- Key people: Nikolaos Tachiaos (CEO)
- Owner: Government of Greece (100%)
- Subsidiaries: Attiko Metro Operation Company; Tram S.A. (all divested)
- Website: emetro.gr

Elliniko Metro (Greek: Ελληνικό Μετρό), formerly Attiko Metro (Αττικό Μετρό) until May 2023, is a Greek State-owned company who is responsible for the development and construction of the Athens Metro and the Thessaloniki Metro, as well as the Athens Tram.

Headquartered in the Ellinoroson neighbourhood of the center of Athens, the Greek government created the company in July 1991: Elliniko Metro's original purpose was to oversee the delivery of the Base Project of the Athens Metro, which opened in three stages, in 2000 and 2003. Elliniko Metro also owned and operated the Athens Metro and Tram until June 2011, when STASY took over that role.

== History ==
The Greek government established Elliniko Metro as Attiko Metro (Greek: Αττικό Μετρό) on 18 July 1991, under Law 1955/1991. The original purpose of Attiko Metro was to oversee the delivery of the Base Project of the Athens Metro, whose contract had been awarded to the Olympic Metro consortium of 23 companies in the previous month. The Base Project consisted of two lines with a total length of 17.6 kilometres (10.9 miles) and 20 stations, and opened in three phases from 28 January 2000 to 22 April 2003. The Greek government then assigned Attiko Metro the role of developing and build the Thessaloniki Metro in December 2003, and any future extensions to the Athens Tram in 2013.

On 18 May 2023, Greek Prime Minister Kyriakos Mitsotakis announced that in advance of the opening of the Thessaloniki Metro in 2024, Attiko Metro would change its name to Elliniko Metro.

== Organisation ==
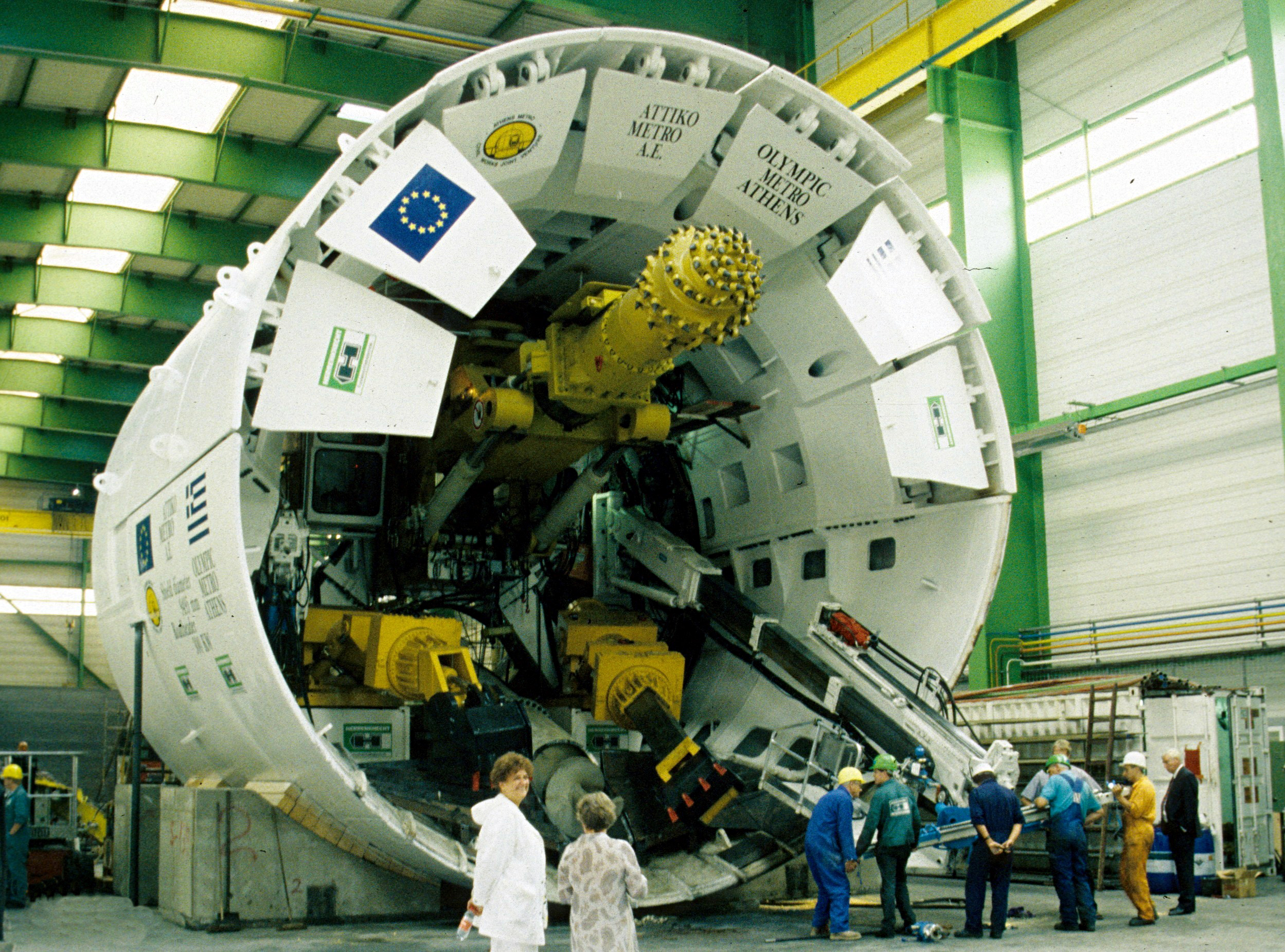
Tunnel boring machine for the Athens Metro

The Greek government is currently the only shareholder of Elliniko Metro. Law 1955/1991 allows the partial privatisation of Elliniko Metro in the future, but the Greek government must retain a controlling interest of at least 51% over any resultant company: Elliniko Metro may also only merge with mass transit organizations that operate within the area of the former Attica Prefecture.

== Current operations ==
Elliniko Metro is currently responsible for the development and construction of the Athens Metro, the Thessaloniki Metro, and the Athens Tram.

== Former operations ==
Elliniko Metro previously had two operational subsidiaries to operate and maintain lines 2 and 3 of the Athens Metro, and the current Athenian tram network: on 17 June 2011, AMEL and Tram S.A. merged with Athens–Piraeus Electric Railways (ISAP) to form STASY, a subsidiary of Transport for Athens (OASA) instead of Elliniko Metro:

- The Attiko Metro Operation Company (Greek: Αττικό Μετρό Εταιρεία Λειτουργίας, Attiko Metro Etaireia Leitourgias), commonly abbreviated to AMEL, operated and maintained the infrastructure of lines 2 and 3 of the Athens Metro, except for the surface section of Line 3 between Doukissis Plakentias and Athens Airport. Headquartered at the Sepolia Metro Depot at Kifissou Avenue 94, AMEL was established on 15 February 2001, three years after Law 2669/1998 allowed Elliniko Metro to operate and maintain Lines 2 and 3.
- Tram S.A. (Greek: ΤΡΑΜ Α.Ε.) operated and maintained the infrastructure of the Athens Tram, which by June 2011 consisted of 35 Sirio trams and 48 stops. Headquartered at the tram depot in Elliniko, Tram S.A. was established in March 2001.

The logos of both companies were the same as the system that they operated.

== Timeline of Athens Metro projects ==
In this table, the completion date refers to the opening of the last section or station in the contract: for example, the initial scheme of the Athens Metro opened in three stages, on 28 January 2000, 15 November 2000, and 22 April 2003.

Phase	Description	Completed	Notes	Ref.
A	Athens Metro Line 2 between Sepolia and Dafni; Athens Metro Line 3 between Monastiraki and Ethniki Amyna	22 April 2003	Construction of Kerameikos was suspended in 1998, due to an archaeological dispute. The station eventually opened at a different location, as part of Phase B4.	
B1	Athens Metro Line 3 extension from Ethniki Amyna to Athens Airport	30 December 2010	Six stations in this section opened later than the line itself. The stations that opened later were: Paiania–Kantza, Pallini and Koropi (in 2006); Nomismatokopio (2009); and Agia Paraskevi and Holargos (2010).	
B2	Athens Metro Line 2 extension from Dafni to Agios Dimitrios	5 June 2004		
B3	Athens Metro Line 2 extension from Sepolia to Agios Antonios	9 August 2004		
B4	Athens Metro Line 3 extension from Monastiraki to Egaleo	26 May 2007	The project included the deferred Kerameikos station.	
B5	Athens Metro Line 2 extension from Agios Antonios to Anthoupoli	6 April 2013		
B6	Athens Metro Line 2 extension from Agios Dimitrios to Elliniko	26 July 2013		
B7	Athens Metro Line 3 extension from Egaleo to Agia Marina	14 December 2013		
B8	Athens Metro Line 3 extension from Agia Marina to Dimotiko Theatro	10 October 2022		
B9	Athens Metro Line 4 from Alsos Veikou to Goudi	2030 (planned)	The project is currently under construction.	

== See also ==
- Ministry of Infrastructure and Transport
- STASY
