= Katechaki metro station =

Athens Metro station

Κατεχάκη Katehaki
- Station platforms

General information
- Location: Katechaki Avenue; Athens; Greece
- Coordinates: 37°59′35″N 23°46′35″E
- Manager: STASY
- Line: Athens Metro Line 3
- Platforms: 2
- Tracks: 2

Construction
- Structure type: Underground
- Accessible: Yes

Key dates
- 28 January 2000: Opened

Services
Preceding station	Athens Metro	Following station
Panormou towards Dimotiko Theatro	Line 3	Ethniki Amyna towards Athens Airport
Location

Katechaki (Greek: Κατεχάκη), also known as Katehaki on signage, is an Athens Metro Line 3 (Blue Line) station, located at Katechaki Avenue and Mesogeion Avenue. Nearby locations include:

- The former Ministry of Public Order
- 401 Military Hospital of Athens
- Goudi Olympic Complex
- National Glyptotheque of Greece
- National Technical University of Athens Zografou campus.

== Station layout ==
G	Ground	Exits/Entrances
C	Concourse	Customer Service, Tickets
P Platforms	Side platform, doors will open on the right
P Platforms	Platform 1	← towards Dimotiko Theatro (Panormou)
P Platforms	Platform 2	→ towards Athens Airport (Ethniki Amyna) →
P Platforms	Side platform, doors will open on the right

== Cultural works ==
Vasso Peklari's Sculptural forms (Greek: Φόρμες με Υφαντό Χαλκό) is at the station's concourse.
