= Agia Paraskevi metro station =

Athens Metro station

Αγία Παρασκευή Aghia Paraskevi
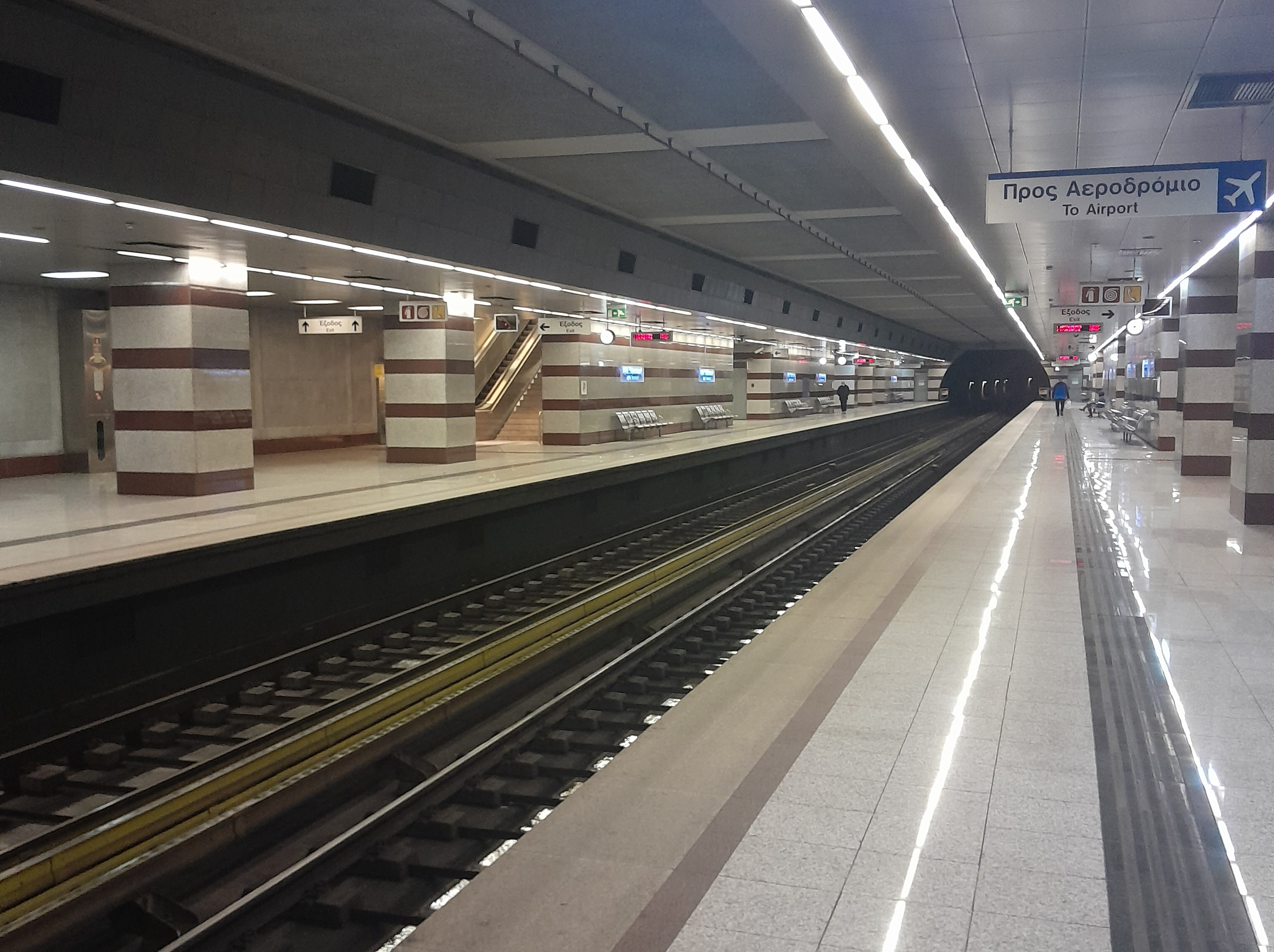
- Station platform

General information
- Location: Agia Paraskevi; Chalandri; Greece
- Coordinates: 38°01′02″N 23°48′45″E
- Manager: STASY
- Line: Athens Metro Line 3
- Platforms: 2
- Tracks: 2

Construction
- Structure type: Underground
- Accessible: Yes

Key dates
- 24 July 2004: Line opened
- 30 December 2010: Station opened

Services
| Preceding station | Athens Metro | Following station |
|---|---|---|
| Nomismatokopio towards Dimotiko Theatro | Line 3 | Chalandri towards Athens Airport |
Location

Agia Paraskevi (Greek: Αγία Παρασκευή), also known as Aghia Paraskevi on signage, is a station on Athens Metro Line 3. It opened on 30 December 2010, although its construction necessitated disruption of metro services east of Ethniki Amyna for 6 months.

== Station layout ==
| G | Ground | Exits/Entrances |
| C | Concourse | Customer Service, Tickets |
| P Platforms | Side platform, doors will open on the right |
| P Platforms | Platform 1 | ← towards Dimotiko Theatro (Nomismatokopio) |
| P Platforms | Platform 2 | → towards Athens Airport (Chalandri) → |
| P Platforms | Side platform, doors will open on the right |

== Importance To Local Community ==
Aghia Paraskevi metro station is located in the border in-between Municipalities Of Aghia Paraskevi and Chalandri in North Athens district. It has 2 entrances, and a roof built and a magnificent building. It serves 7,000 passengers daily and is the 19th most used station in Line 3. It serves Aghias Paraskevis Avenue as well as many shops, residences, and the American Community School of Athens
