= Panormou metro station =

Athens Metro station

Πανόρμου Panormou
- Station platforms

General information
- Location: Panormou Avenue; Athens; Greece
- Coordinates: 37°59′34″N 23°46′00″E
- Manager: STASY
- Line: Athens Metro Line 3
- Platforms: 2
- Tracks: 2

Construction
- Structure type: Underground
- Accessible: Yes

Key dates
- 28 January 2000: Opened

Services
Preceding station	Athens Metro	Following station
Ambelokipi towards Dimotiko Theatro	Line 3	Katechaki towards Athens Airport
Location

Panormou (Greek: Πανόρμου) is an Athens Metro Line 3 station, located at Panormou Ave., near Ambelokipi, Greece. It is also quite close to Kifissias Ave.

== Station layout ==
G
Street level
Exits
B1
Concourse
- Customer Service
- Tickets
B2
Side platform, doors will open on the right
Platform 1
← to Dimotiko Theatro (Ambelokipi)
Platform 2
to Athens Airport (Katechaki) →
Side platform, doors will open on the right

== Cultural works ==
Mihalis Katzourakis's Mazareko is at the station's concourse and platforms, consisting of coloured neon lights.
