= Ambelokipi metro station =

Athens Metro station

Αμπελόκηποι Ambelokipi
- Station platforms

General information
- Location: Alexandras Avenue; Athens; Greece
- Coordinates: 37°59′14″N 23°45′27″E
- Manager: STASY
- Line: Athens Metro Line 3
- Platforms: 2
- Tracks: 2

Construction
- Structure type: Underground
- Accessible: Yes

Key dates
- 28 January 2000: Opened

Services
Preceding station	Athens Metro	Following station
Megaro Mousikis towards Dimotiko Theatro	Line 3	Panormou towards Athens Airport
Location

Ampelokipi Station (Greek: Αμπελόκηποι, romanized: Ampelokipoi) is a station of the Athens Metro, on line 3. It is located in Athens and took its name from the Athenian district of Ampelokipoi, which it serves. It was inaugurated on 28 January 2000. It is underground and has two side docks.

It is located under the junction of Alexandras Avenue and Dimitriou Soutsou Street, near the Attica General Police Directorate (GADA), the Hellenic Supreme Court and the Panathinaikos stadium.

On the roof of the station stretch colorful lines illuminated with neon lights, a work by Stephen Antonakos entitled Procession. The luminous visual lines that guide passengers in and out of the station refer to the ancient Athenian processions of citizens.

In 1979 the initial location of the station was made in Thon (Alexandras and Vasilissis Sofias, tram terminus of Ampelokipoi until 1953), but in 1991 it was determined in its current location.

Connecting station with city buses and trolleybuses

At the connecting station with city buses and trolleybuses located near the metro station, 12 bus lines and 5 trolleybus lines 3, 10, 14, 18, 19, 19B, A7, B5, X14, X95, 230, 400, 409, 416, 550, 610, 653, 813 have a start/end or pass through.

== Station layout ==
G
Street level
Exits
B1
Concourse
- Customer Service
- Tickets
B2
Side platform, doors will open on the right
Platform 1
← to Dimotiko Theatro (Megaro Mousikis)
Platform 2
to Athens Airport (Panormou) →
Side platform, doors will open on the right
