= Chalandri metro station =

Athens Metro station

Χαλάνδρι Halandri
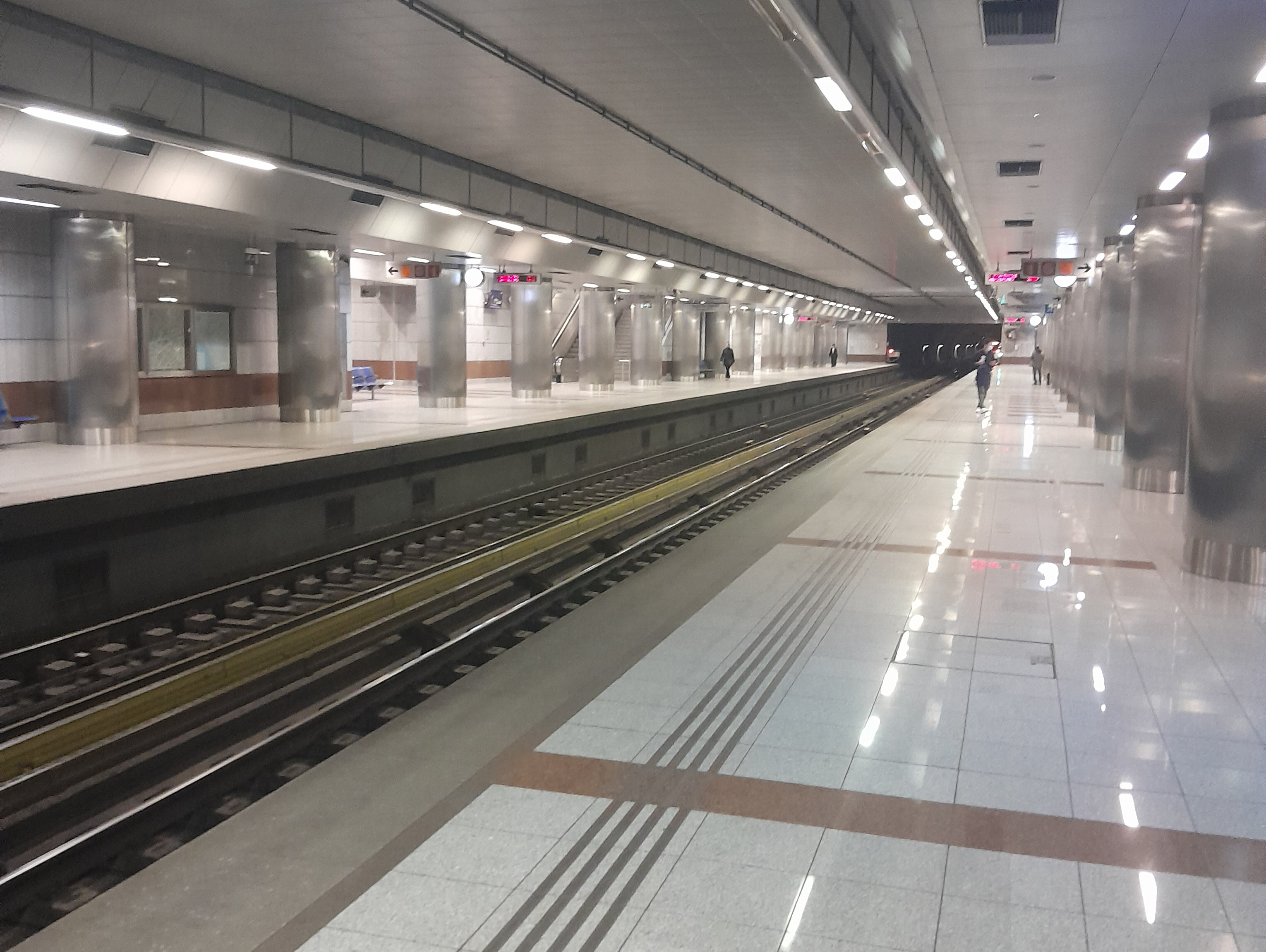
- Station platforms

General information
- Location: Chalandri; Greece
- Coordinates: 38°01′18″N 23°49′15″E
- Manager: STASY
- Line: Athens Metro Line 3
- Platforms: 2
- Tracks: 2

Construction
- Structure type: Underground
- Accessible: Yes

Key dates
- 24 July 2004: Opened

Services
Preceding station	Athens Metro	Following station
Agia Paraskevi towards Dimotiko Theatro	Line 3	Doukissis Plakentias towards Athens Airport
Location

Chalandri (Greek: Χαλάνδρι), also known as Halandri on signage, is a station on Athens Metro Line 3. It opened on 24 July 2004 and served as the original northern terminus for four days, until Doukissis Plakentias opened. The eastbound platform has a mural by Rena Papaspirou, titled Images Through Matter (2010). It serves the suburb of Chalandri.

== Station layout ==
G	Ground	Exits/Entrances
C	Concourse	Tickets for Airport-bound trains
C	Concourse	Customer Service, Tickets
P Platforms	Side platform, doors will open on the right
P Platforms	Platform 1	← towards Dimotiko Theatro (Agia Paraskevi)
P Platforms	Platform 2	→ towards Athens Airport (Doukissis Plakentias) →
P Platforms	Side platform, doors will open on the right
