= Eleonas metro station =

Athens Metro station

Ελαιώνας Eleonas
- Station platforms

General information
- Location: Aigaleo; Greece
- Coordinates: 37.987725°N 23.693375°E
- Manager: STASY
- Line: Athens Metro Line 3
- Platforms: 2
- Tracks: 2

Construction
- Structure type: Underground
- Accessible: Yes

Key dates
- 26 May 2007: Opened

Services
Preceding station	Athens Metro	Following station
Egaleo towards Dimotiko Theatro	Line 3	Kerameikos towards Athens Airport
Location

Eleonas (Greek: Ελαιώνας, Elaionas, lit. 'Olive Grove') is a station on Athens Metro Line 3. It opened on 26 May 2007 as part of the Egaleo extension.

During planning in the late-1990s, the station was known as "Agios Savvas" (Άγιος Σάββας), after a nearby church.

== Station layout ==
G Ground	-	Exits
C Concourse	Concourse	Customer Service, Tickets
P Platforms	Side platform, doors will open on the right
P Platforms	Platform 1	← towards Dimotiko Theatro (Egaleo)
P Platforms	Platform 2	→ towards Athens Airport (Kerameikos)→
P Platforms	Side platform, doors will open on the right
