= Maniatika metro station =

Athens Metro station

Μανιάτικα Maniatika
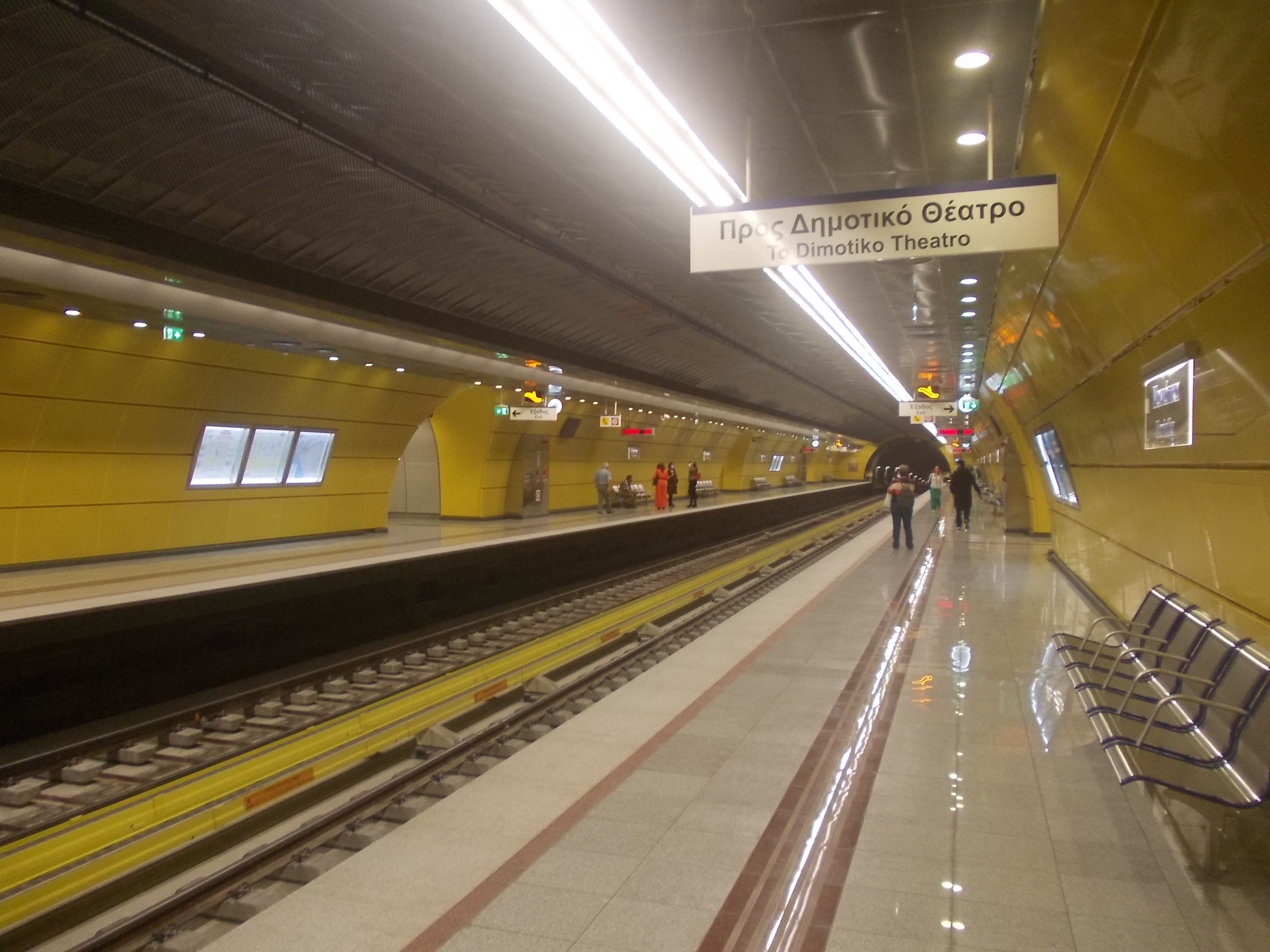
- The southbound platform on the first day of operation

General information
- Location: Aitolikou & Mavromichali; 185 44 Piraeus; Greece
- Coordinates: 37°57′34.85″N 23°38′24.12″E
- Manager: STASY
- Line: Athens Metro Line 3
- Platforms: 2
- Tracks: 2

Construction
- Structure type: Underground
- Accessible: Yes

Key dates
- 10 October 2022: Opened

Services
Preceding station	Athens Metro	Following station
Piraeus towards Dimotiko Theatro	Line 3	Nikaia towards Athens Airport
Location

Maniatika (Greek: Μανιάτικα) is a station on Line 3 of the Athens Metro. The station opened on October 10, 2022 as part of a south extension of the line from Nikaia to Dimotiko Theatro. It serves the areas of Maniatika and Agia Sofia, both neighbourhoods of Piraeus.

== History ==
The station first appeared in the 2000 Athens Metro plan. According to this plan, the station was located on the corner of 25is Martiou and Falirou street, near Agioi Anargyroi church. In the revised 2006 plan the station appeared on its current location, but was named Tambouria. Construction began in July 2012 and was due to be completed in 2017, but it was finally postponed until 2022 due to tunneling problems caused by the existence of caves in the area. The TBM arrived at Maniatika on March 22, 2017.

== Entrances ==
The station's sole entrance is located on the corner of Aitolikou and Mavromichali street in Maniatika, Piraeus. The station is fully ADA accessible

== Controversy and Construction Problems ==
During the construction of the station, there was a strong opposition by local residents. This was due to the closing of public streets and the demolition of certain buildings in order for the station to be constructed. This opposition was mainly centered around the "To Metro Skotonei ta Maniatika" ("Metro kills Maniatika") facebook page.

During the construction of the tunnel between Nikaia and Maniatika there was a large number of caves discovered. The caves were filled with cement, but caused the tunneling process to slow down. This was ultimately the reason that led the delivery of the station to be delayed.

== Station layout ==
G Ground	-	Exits
C Concourse	Concourse	Customer Service, Tickets
P Platforms	Side platform, doors will open on the right
P Platforms	Platform 1	← towards Dimotiko Theatro (Piraeus)
P Platforms	Platform 2	→ towards Athens Airport (Nikaia) →
P Platforms	Side platform, doors will open on the right

== Gallery ==
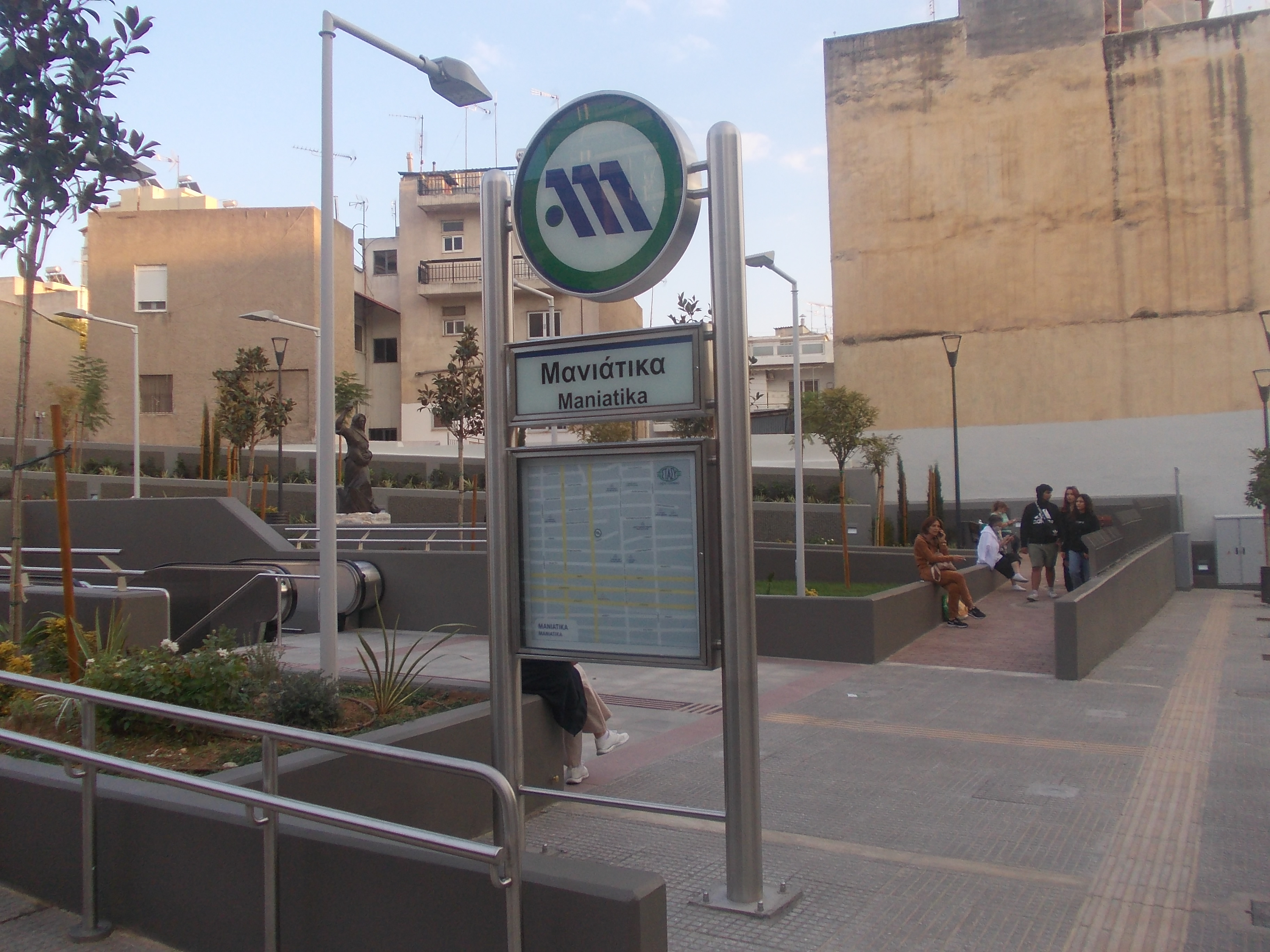
Sign at the station entrance

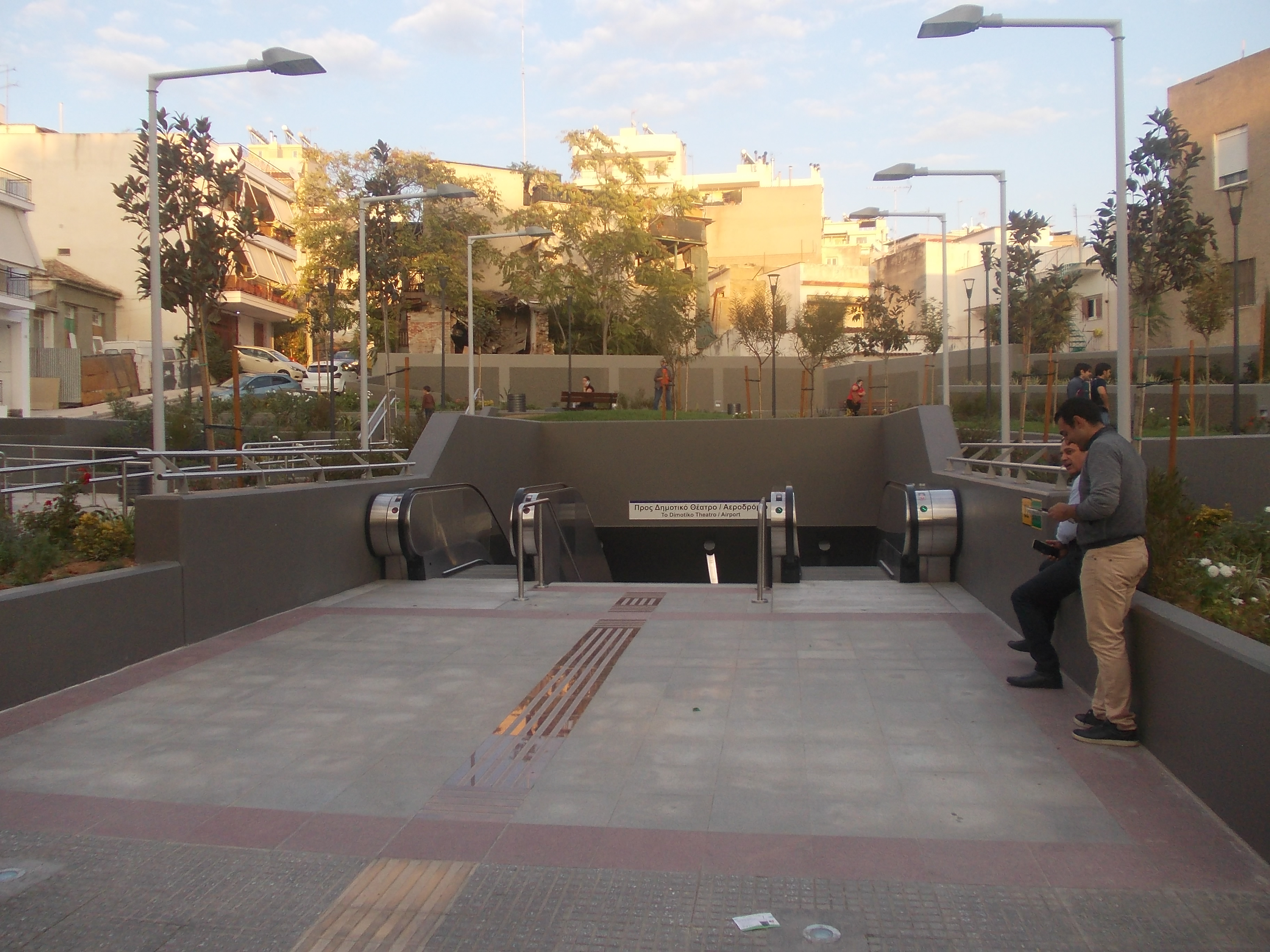
Entrance at Aitolikou street

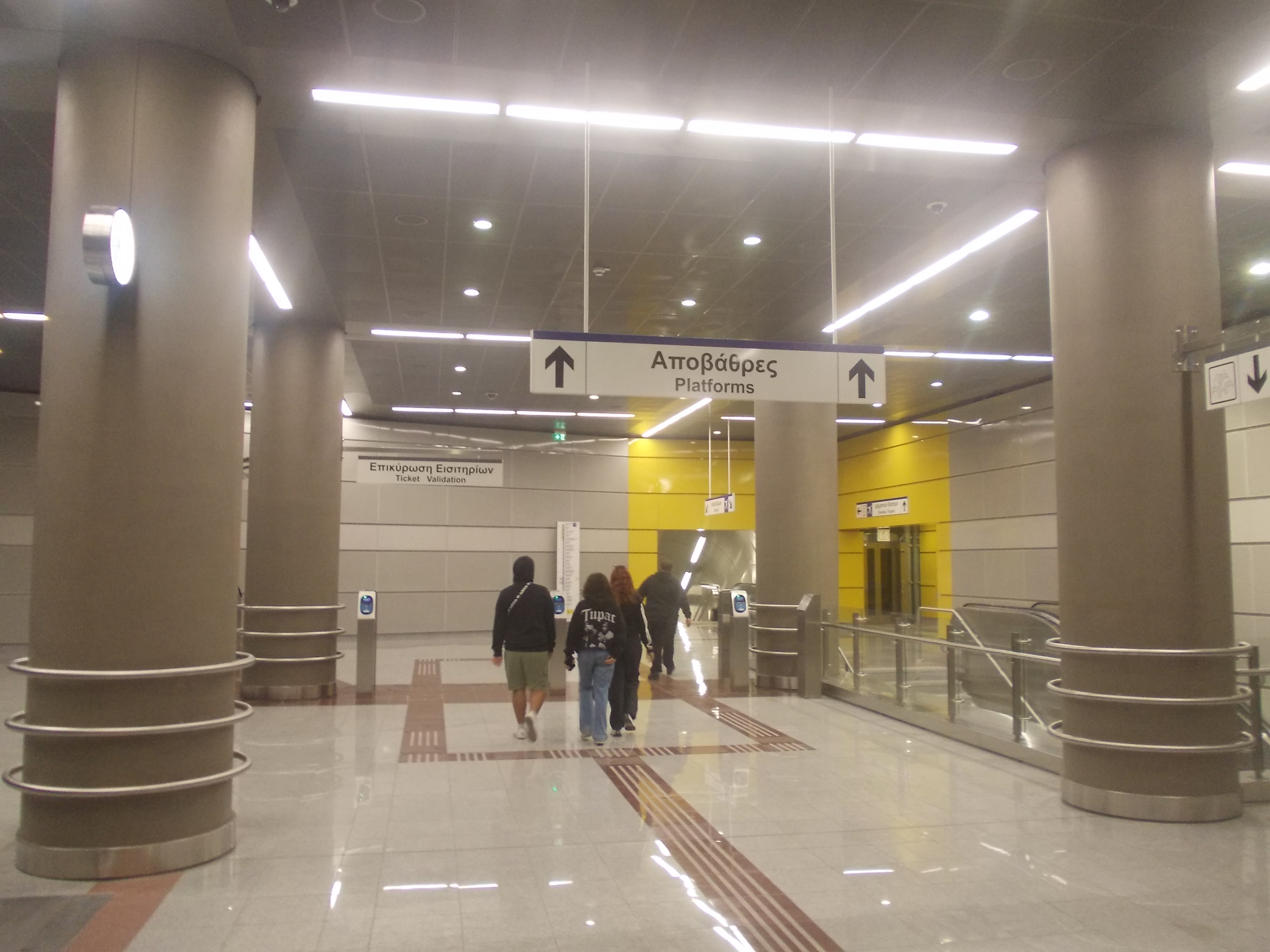
The station's concourse level

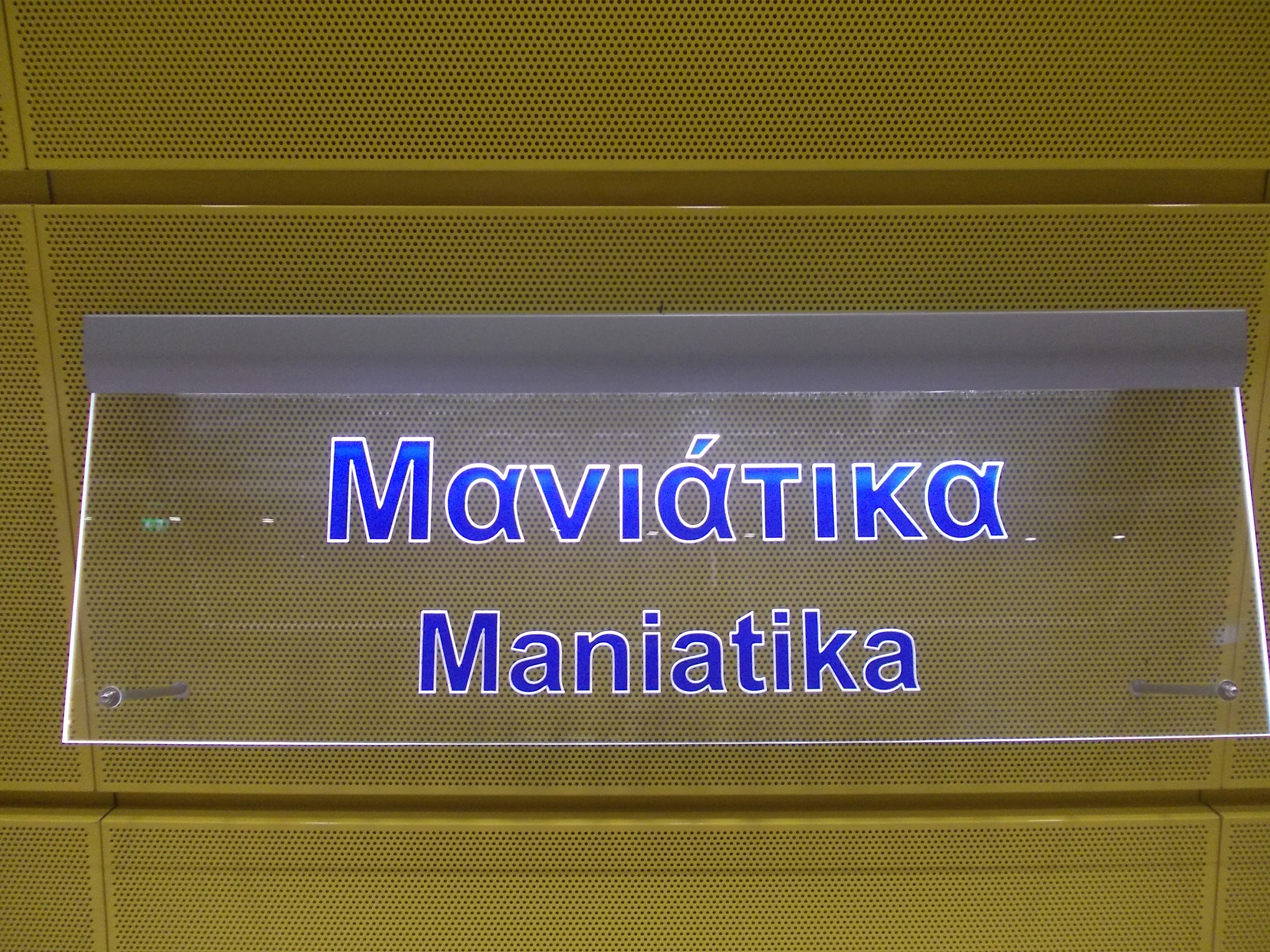
Station's sign on the platforms
