= Nomismatokopio metro station =

Athens Metro station

Νομισματοκοπείο Nomismatokopio
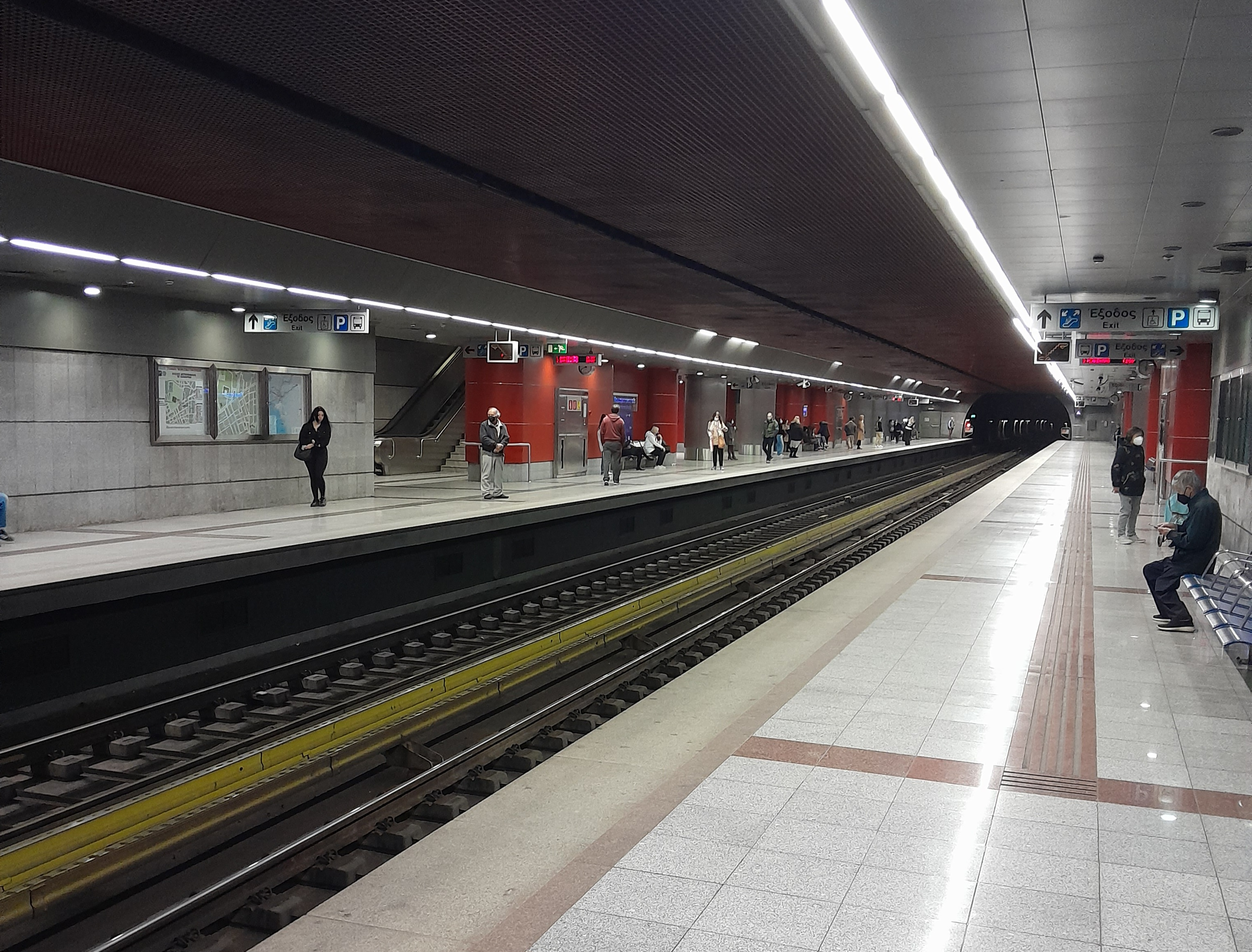
- Station platforms

General information
- Location: Mesogeion Avenue; 152 31 Chalandri; Greece
- Coordinates: 38°00′33″N 23°48′21″E
- Manager: STASY
- Line: Athens Metro Line 3
- Platforms: 2
- Tracks: 2

Construction
- Structure type: Underground
- Accessible: Yes

Key dates
- 24 July 2004: Line opened
- 2 September 2009: Station opened

Services
Preceding station	Athens Metro	Following station
Cholargos towards Dimotiko Theatro	Line 3	Agia Paraskevi towards Athens Airport
Location

Nomismatokopio (Greek: Νομισματοκοπείο, Nomismatokopeio) is a station on Athens Metro Line 3. It opened on 2 September 2009.

== Station layout ==
G	Ground	Exits/Entrances
C	Concourse	Customer Service, Tickets
P Platforms	Side platform, doors will open on the right
P Platforms	Platform 1	← towards Dimotiko Theatro (Cholargos)
P Platforms	Platform 2	→ towards Athens Airport (Agia Paraskevi) →
P Platforms	Side platform, doors will open on the right
