= Phlya =

Coordinates: 38°01′35″N 23°48′25″E

Phlya (Ancient Greek: Φλύα or Φλυά) was a deme of ancient Attica that lay in the Mesogaea. It must have been a place of importance from the number of temples which it contained, and from its frequent mention in inscriptions. It was host to the Phlyan mystery cult of Demeter and Dionysus, funded by the Lycomid family.

The site of Phlya is located near modern Chalandri.
