= Egaleo metro station =

Athens Metro station

Αιγάλεω Egaleo
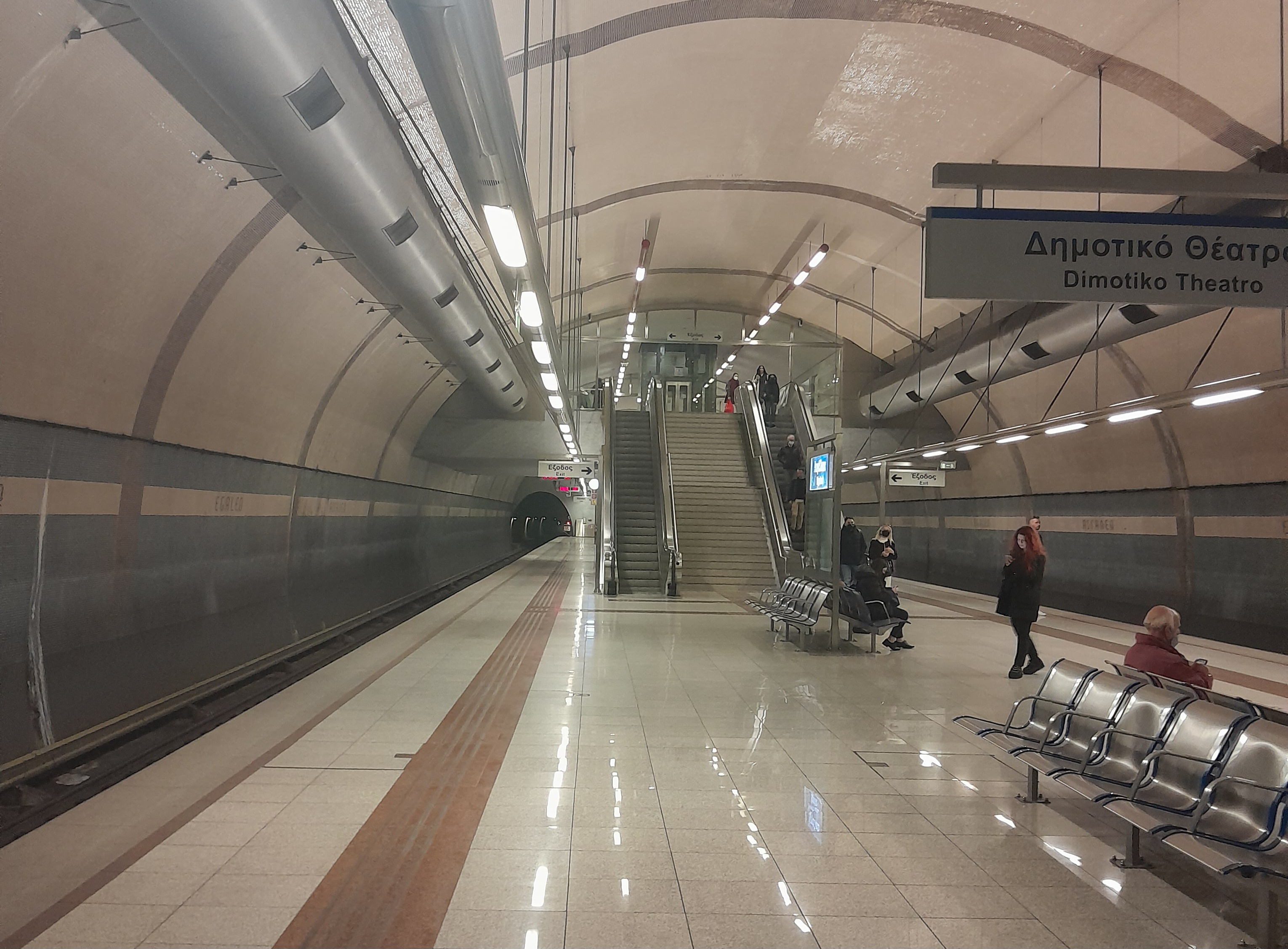
- Station platforms

General information
- Location: 122 42 Aigaleo; Greece
- Coordinates: 37°59′28.8″N 23°40′54.7″E
- Manager: STASY
- Line: Athens Metro Line 3
- Platforms: 2
- Tracks: 2

Construction
- Structure type: Underground
- Accessible: Yes

Key dates
- 26 May 2007: Opened

Services
Preceding station	Athens Metro	Following station
Agia Marina towards Dimotiko Theatro	Line 3	Eleonas towards Athens Airport
Location

Egaleo (Greek: Αιγάλεω, Aigaleo) is a station of Athens Metro Line 3. The station started operating on 26 May 2007 as part of an extension from Monastiraki.

== Station layout ==
G Ground	-	Exits
C Concourse	Concourse	Customer Service, Tickets
P Platforms	Platform 1	← towards Dimotiko Theatro (Agia Marina)
P Platforms	Island platform, doors will open on the left
P Platforms	Platform 2	→ towards Athens Airport (Eleonas) →
