= Line 3 (Athens Metro) =

Rapid transit line in Athens, Greece

Προς Δημοτικό Θέατρο/Αεροδρόμιο To Dimotiko Theatro/Airport
- White number three on a blue square
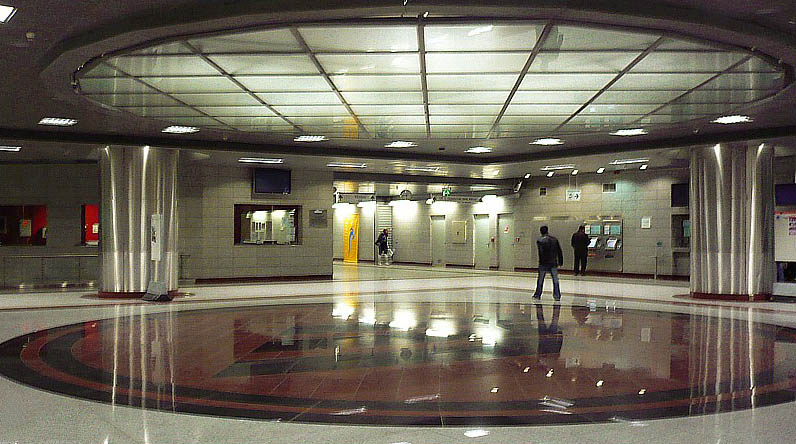
- Doukissis Plakentias ticket hall

Overview
- Locale: Athens
- Termini: Dimotiko Theatro; Doukissis Plakentias/Athens Airport
- Stations: 27
- Colour on map: Blue (Note: The colour of Line 3 varies: the signage, in-car line diagrams and STASY maps (since 7 October 2022) use blue, while Attiko Metro maps (as well as those of STASY until 7 October 2022) use sky blue.)
- Website: Official website

Service
- Type: Rapid transit; Airport rail link
- System: Athens Metro
- Operator: STASY
- Depots: Eleonas; Plakentias
- Rolling stock: 1st, 2nd (DC and AC/DC) and 3rd Generations

History
- Opened: 28 January 2000; 26 years ago
- Last extension: 10 October 2022

Technical
- Line length: 47.3 km (29.4 mi)
- Character: Deep-level
- Track gauge: 1,435 mm (4 ft 8 1/2 in) standard gauge
- Electrification: 750 V DC third rail; 25 kV 50 Hz AC overhead (Note: Between Doukissis Plakentias and Athens Airport.)

Line 3 of the Athens Metro is a rapid transit line that runs between Dimotiko Theatro in the west and Doukissis Plakentias or Athens Airport in the east, via Syntagma. Most Line 3 trains start or terminate at Doukissis Plakentias: a through service to the Airport leaves once every 36 minutes, and shares most of the extended route with the Athens Suburban Railway. It runs for 47.3 kilometres (29.4 mi), making it the system's longest line.

Line 3 provides a direct service every 36 minutes between the Port of Piraeus with the Athens International Airport, a journey that takes up to 59 minutes. The line between Dimotiko Theatro and Doukissis Plakentias is underground, and the shared section with the Athens Suburban Railway towards the Airport is a surface-level median of the A6 and A64 motorways.

It first opened, between Ethniki Amyna and Syntagma, on 28 January 2000, with Line 2. In 2012, construction works commenced for the latest underground extension of Line 3 to Dimotiko Theatro via Piraeus which was completed on 10 October 2022.

== Rolling stock ==
Dual voltage ROTEM-supplied stock with greater luggage space is used for services to Athens International Airport. Line 3 rail vehicles utilize 750 V DC third rail current collection between Dimotiko Theatro and Doukissis Plakentias, changing to 25 kV AC overhead catenary while operating on the Athens Suburban Railway for access to/from the airport.

== Extensions ==
=== Extension to Piraeus ===
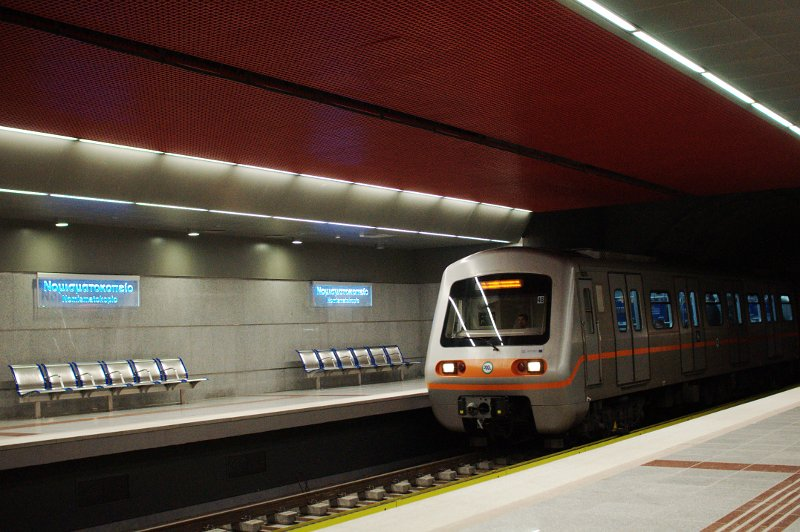
A Line 3 train approaching the northbound platform of the Nomismatokopio station

On 1 March 2012 a contract was signed between Attiko Metro S.A. and a joint venture for the construction of the extension of Line 3 from Haidari (Agia Marina) to Piraeus, 7.6 km (4.7 mi) long with six stations. The extension to Nikaia in 2020 brought the Korydallos and Nikaia municipalities into the network's catchment area, serve approximately 132,000 passengers on a daily basis and upon completion in 2022, connects to the port of Piraeus, the largest passenger port of Europe with the Athens International Airport in just 1 hour. The completion dates of the final three stations are as follows:

- Maniatika (10 October 2022)
- Piraeus (10 October 2022)
- Dimotiko Theatro ("Municipal Theatre", 10 October 2022)

Notes

- The original plans included one more station after Dimotiko Theatro, named Evaggelistria. Attiko Metro cancelled plans for the station on 10 November 2008, due to local objections (mainly by the Metropolitan Bishop of Piraeus District).
- There were plans to build a station between Korydallos and Nikaia named Perivolaki.

=== Cancelled proposals ===
There was a plan for Line 3 to have a branch line from Panormou to Marousi: that proposal was absorbed by the U-shaped Line 4 on 1 December 2005, with Georgios Souflias (then Minister for the Environment, Physical Planning and Public Works) stating that the branch line proposal would have limited the frequency of trains on either branch. The branch line was similar to what is now Phase 2 of Line 4, but it did not include OTE, and Faros was at a different location.

During the construction of the first section of Line 3, Elliniko Metro considered building stations at Geoponiki (Greek: Γεωπονική) on the extension towards Egaleo between Kerameikos and Eleonas, and Girokomeio (Γηροκομείο) on the planned Marousi branch between Panormou and Faros.

== 2018 timetable controversy ==
On 1 November 2018, STASY introduced a new timetable that scrapped direct metro services to the airport from the city center, due to the lack of spare parts for the fleet. At the time, travelers from the city center to the Airport had to change at Doukissis Plakentias. Reception towards the timetable changes was overwhelmingly negative: the negative reception included a complaint by the Transport Ministry General Secretary, Thanos Vourdas, claiming that STASY required ministerial approval to scrap the airport trains. On 9 November 2018, STASY decided to reinstate the original service pattern, from 10 November 2018.

== Map ==
The route of Line 3 (including the Doukissis Plakentias–Airport section)

== Stations ==
The spelling of the station names on this table, in English and Greek, are according to the signage. Most Line 3 stations have two tracks and two side platforms: Egaleo, Ethniki Amyna, Koropi, Monastiraki, Paiania–Kantza and Pallini have two tracks and one island platform. Athens Airport has three tracks and two island platforms, but Metro trains can only use the middle track.

¤	Limited service of one train every 36 minutes
†	Terminal station
#	Interchange station

Station English	Station Greek	Image	Municipality	Opened	Interchanges and notes	Position
Dimotiko Theatro^{†#}	Δημοτικό Θέατρο		Piraeus	10 October 2022	Interchange with the Athens Tram at Dimarcheio.	37.942905°N 23.647350°E
Piraeus^{#}	Πειραιάς		Piraeus	10 October 2022 (Note: The Line 1 station opened on 27 February 1869.)	Interchange with Line 1 and the Athens Suburban Railway.	37.948100°N 23.642265°E
Maniatika	Μανιάτικα		Piraeus	10 October 2022		37.959545°N 23.639780°E
Nikaia	Νίκαια		Nikaia-Agios Ioannis Rentis	7 July 2020		37.965745°N 23.647550°E
Korydallos	Κορυδαλλός		Korydallos	7 July 2020		37.977050°N 23.650405°E
Agia Varvara	Αγία Βαρβάρα		Agia Varvara	7 July 2020		37.989710°N 23.659320°E
Agia Marina	Αγία Μαρίνα		Agia Varvara	14 December 2013		37.996860°N 23.667130°E
Egaleo	Αιγάλεω		Aigaleo	26 May 2007		37.991420°N 23.681690°E
Eleonas	Ελαιώνας		Aigaleo	26 May 2007		37.987725°N 23.693375°E
Kerameikos	Κεραμεικός		Athens	26 May 2007	Construction of Kerameikos was suspended in 1998 and later relocated, due to an archaeological dispute.	37.978715°N 23.710940°E
Monastiraki^{#}	Μοναστηράκι		Athens	22 April 2003 (Note: The Line 1 station opened on 17 May 1895.)	Interchange with Line 1. Some platform signs on Line 1 use the station's Katharevousa name, "Monastirion" (Greek: Μοναστήριον).	37.976615°N 23.725905°E
Syntagma^{#}	Σύνταγμα		Athens	28 January 2000	Interchange with Line 2 and the Athens Tram.	37.974790°N 23.735535°E
Evangelismos	Ευαγγελισμός		Athens	28 January 2000		37.975900°N 23.746560°E
Megaro Moussikis	Μέγαρο Μουσικής		Athens	28 January 2000		37.979370°N 23.753515°E
Ambelokipi	Αμπελόκηποι		Athens	28 January 2000		37.986945°N 23.757600°E
Panormou	Πανόρμου		Athens	28 January 2000		37.993030°N 23.763530°E
Katehaki	Κατεχάκη		Athens	28 January 2000		37.993445°N 23.776965°E
Ethniki Amyna	Εθνική Άμυνα		Athens; Papagou-Cholargos	28 January 2000		37.999475°N 23.784810°E
Holargos	Χολαργός		Chalandri; Papagou-Cholargos	23 July 2010	This station opened after the extension to Chalandri.	38.004710°N 23.794355°E
Nomismatokopio	Νομισματοκοπείο		Agia Paraskevi; Chalandri	2 September 2009	This station opened after the extension to Chalandri.	38.009425°N 23.805970°E
Aghia Paraskevi	Αγία Παρασκευή		Chalandri	30 December 2010	This station opened after the extension to Chalandri.	38.017380°N 23.812765°E
Halandri	Χαλάνδρι		Chalandri	24 July 2004		38.021755°N 23.821185°E
Doukissis Plakentias (Note: Doukissis Plakentias is signed as "Plakentias" (Greek: Πλακεντίας) on the Athens Suburban Railway.)^{†#}	Δουκίσσης Πλακεντίας		Chalandri	28 July 2004	Interchange with the Athens Suburban Railway at Plakentias.	38.023965°N 23.832545°E
Pallini^{¤#}	Παλλήνη		Pallini	September 2006 (Note: Pallini, Paiania–Kantza and Koropi opened on 30 July 2004, for Athens Suburban Railway trains only.)	Interchange with the Athens Suburban Railway. This station is operated by GAIAOSE.	38.005100°N 23.869825°E
Paiania–Kantza^{¤#}	Παιανία - Κάντζα		Paiania	10 July 2006	Interchange with the Athens Suburban Railway. This station is operated by GAIAOSE.	37.984485°N 23.870020°E
Koropi^{¤#}	Κορωπί		Kropia	10 July 2006	Interchange with the Athens Suburban Railway. This station is operated by GAIAOSE.	37.912860°N 23.895860°E
Athens International Airport^{¤†#}	Διεθνής Αερολιμένας Αθηνών		Spata-Artemida	30 July 2004	Interchange with the Athens Suburban Railway. This station is operated by Athens International Airport S.A.	37.936890°N 23.944700°E
