= Ethniki Amyna metro station =

Athens Metro station

Εθνική Άμυνα Ethniki Amyna
- Station platforms

General information
- Location: Athens; Greece
- Coordinates: 38°00′00″N 23°47′08″E
- Manager: STASY
- Line: Athens Metro Line 3
- Platforms: 2
- Tracks: 2

Construction
- Structure type: Underground
- Accessible: Yes

Key dates
- 28 January 2000: Opened

Services
Preceding station	Athens Metro	Following station
Katechaki towards Dimotiko Theatro	Line 3	Cholargos towards Athens Airport
Location

Ethniki Amyna (Greek: Εθνική Άμυνα, lit. 'National Defence') is an Athens Metro Line 3 (Blue Line) station with an island platform, situated close to the Ministry of National Defence and the Ministry of Transportation and Communications. When the Metro first opened, it served as the terminal station for all trains to that direction (Syntagma station being the other end of the line at the time).

== Station layout ==
G	Ground	Exits/Entrances
C	Concourse	Customer Service, Tickets
P Platforms
P Platforms	Platform 1	← towards Dimotiko Theatro (Katechaki)
P Platforms	Island platform, doors will open on the left
P Platforms	Platform 2	→ towards Athens Airport (Cholargos) →

== Cultural works ==
Ethniki Amyna has four art installations: three sculptures at the platform level and one large installation in the concourse.

- Dimitris Kalamaras: The dead fighter (platform level)
- Clearhos Loukopoulos: Stele (platform level)
- Costas Koulentianos: Nouvelle Generation IX (platform level)
- Costas Tsoklis, Underground Park (concourse)
