= Doukissis Plakentias station =

Athens Metro and Athens Suburban Railway station

Δουκίσσης Πλακεντίας Doukissis Plakentias Πλακεντίας Plakentias
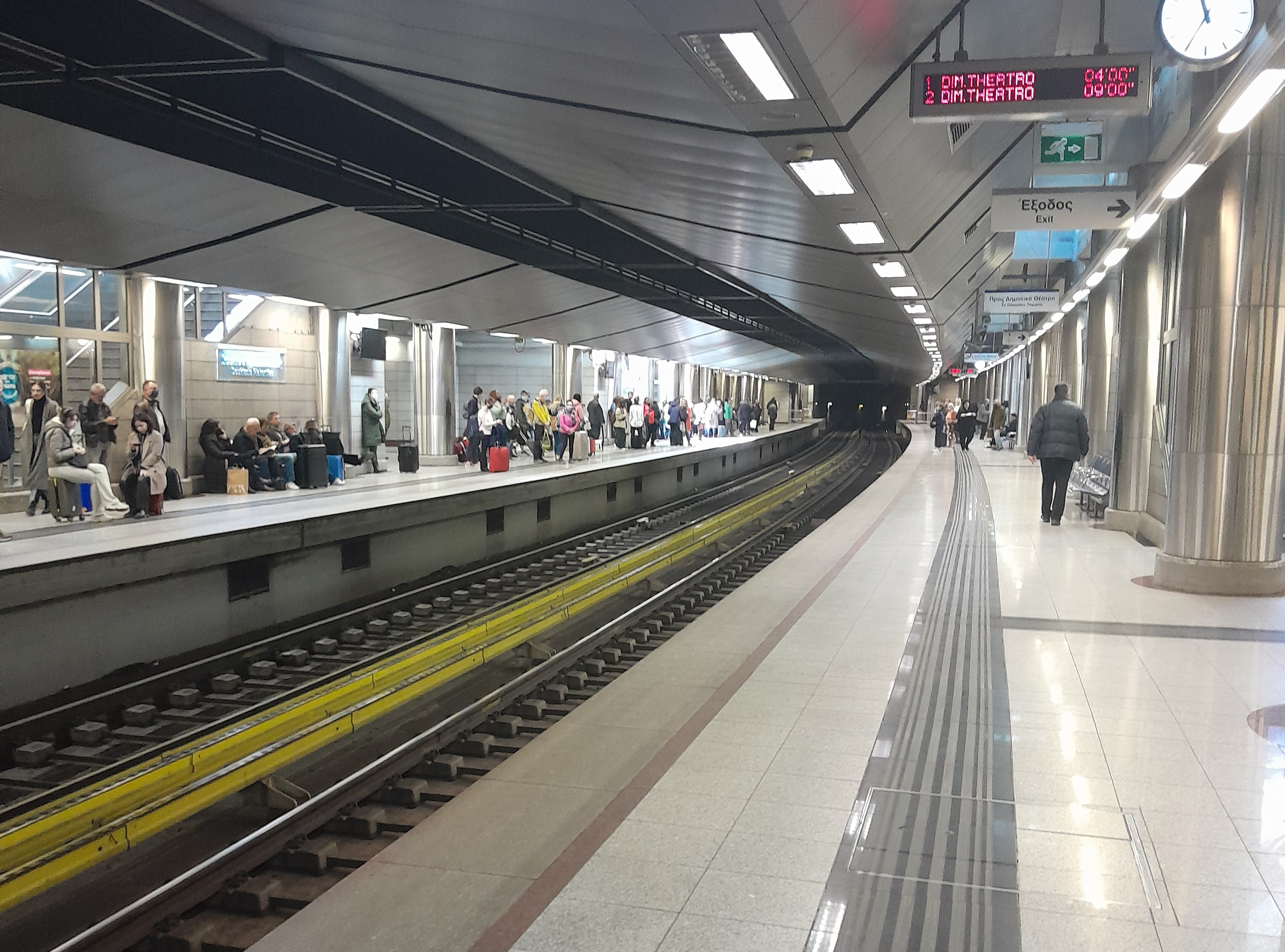
- Metro station platforms

General information
- Location: Doukissis Plakentias Avenue interchange Chalandri; Greece
- Coordinates: 38°01′24.1″N 23°49′59″E
- Owner: GAIAOSE (Suburban Rail); STASY (Metro)
- Operator: Hellenic Train (Suburban Rail); STASY (Metro)
- Lines: Airport–Patras railway
- Platforms: 4
- Tracks: 4

Construction
- Structure type: Underground (Line 3); At-grade (Suburban Rail)
- Platform levels: 2
- Accessible: Yes

Key dates
- 28 July 2004: Metro station opened
- 30 July 2004: Railway station opened
- 4 June 2007: Railway electrified

Services
Preceding station	Suburban Rail	Following station
Pentelis towards Piraeus	Line A1	Pallini towards Athens Airport
Pentelis towards Ano Liosia	Line A2	Pallini towards Athens Airport
Preceding station	Athens Metro	Following station
Chalandri towards Dimotiko Theatro	Line 3	Pallini towards Athens Airport
Location

Doukissis Plakentias (Greek: Δουκίσσης Πλακεντίας), sometimes known simply as Plakentias, is an Athens Metro and Suburban Railway station situated at the end of Doukissis Plakentias Avenue in Chalandri, a municipality in the regional unit of North Athens, Attica, Greece. It is named after the Duchess of Plaisance, a philhellene who owned much of the land in the part of Attica where the station now stands. The metro station lies underground, while the Suburban Railway station lies within the median strip of the A6 motorway (Attiki Odos).

The station is located within the administrative boundaries of the municipality of Chalandri near the settlement of Patima. The Transport for Athens-operated bus station allows access to the northeast suburbs of Athens, northern Mesogeia and East Attica. It is also the junction of A6 motorway and the A621 motorway, with the latter leading to the Hymettus Ring Road. In addition, it is used by the municipal transport services of Chalandri and Vrilissia. Private car parking, taxi and local bus services are also available.

== History ==
The metro station was opened on 28 July 2004, while the Suburban Railway station was opened two days later, along with the first section of the Athens Airport–Patras railway.

In the original plans, the construction of Metro Line 3 and during most of the construction, Doukissis Plakentias station was called "Stavros", while the station now known as Chalandri station was called Doukissis Plakentias. The stations were renamed to their current names during the construction of the Ethniki Amyna - Doukissis Plakentias route. Since Chalandri station is nearest the centre of Chalandri and Doukissis Plakentias is located on the border of three municipalities en route to the tower in Penteli, the names were changed.

The station is owned by GAIAOSE, which since 3 October 2001 owns most railway stations in Greece: the company was also in charge of rolling stock from December 2014 until October 2025, when Greek Railways (the owner of the Airport–Patras railway) took over that responsibility.

== Service ==
The station serves the residents of Chalandri, Agia Paraskevi, Gerakas, Vrilissia, Penteli and Melissia neighborhoods, allowing access to the center of Athens, East Attica and the Athens International Airport.

== Overview and connections ==
=== Suburban Railway station ===
Doukissis Plakentias Station of the Athens Suburban Railway is on the Kiato/Ano Liosia - Airport route. It was inaugurated on July 30, 2004, just before the start of the Olympic Games in Athens. The railway station is at the end of Doukissis Plakentias Avenue and the start of Iraklitou Avenue in Chalandri. It serves three municipalities and has central dock and spotting line trains.

Since 22 November 2025, the following services call at this station:

- Athens Suburban Railway Line A1 between Piraeus (via Metamorfosi) and Athens Airport, with up to one train per hour;
- Athens Suburban Railway Line A2 between Ano Liosia and Athens Airport, with up to two trains per hour on weekdays, and up to one train per hour on weekends and public holidays.

=== Metro Station ===
Doukissis Plakentias station of the Athens Metro is on Line 3. It opened on 28 July 2004. It is underground and has two side platforms, and a depot.

The station has four entrances. The "Doukissis Plakentias to Athens" route is accessible from Plakentias-Iraklitou Avenue, providing access toward the center of Chalandri and Athens. A high surface node is located on the northwest side of the station, on the border with Vrilissia and close to municipal transport. The "Doukissis Plakentias to Vrilissia" route (originally printed misspelt as "Doukissis Plakentias to Vrilissia") is at the rise of Doukissis Plakentias - Iraklitou Avenue to Chalandri-Gerakas in the northeast. From this strip, travellers can board local buses (405, 411, 447, 451) that go to Patima, Penteli or west to Vrilissia.

The "Garyttou" entrance is located in the southwestern lower surface, near Agia Paraskevi (Garyttou street district "Kontopefko"). Here, local bus 406 provides access to the square of Mesogeion Avenue. The fourth entrance is indicated by the "Bus-Parking-Taxi" sign to the southeast that leads to the OASA bus station. with numerous buses to neighbouring suburbs and East Attica. Buses 306 and 307 go to Gerakas and Glyka Nera. Bus 407 goes to Mesogeion Avenue, and other buses serve Pallini, Spata, and Artemida. There are also bus stops on Panagouli Avenue (next to Attiki Odos), with bus service to Vrilissia and Melissia. Taxi service is available. The parking lot for Metro private passengers is also accessible from this entrance.

The station is the terminal point for most trains on Line 3 of the Athens Metro, while some continue their journey to the Athens International Airport, using the Suburban Railway line. The transition between these trains of the two networks is achieved through a dual-tunnel connecting line immediately after the station. Between the tunnel exit and switches to and from Suburban Rail lines, trains transition from the 750 V DC third rail electrification system of the Athens Metro to the AC 25 kV 50 Hz overhead electrification used by OSE.

=== Interchange with city buses ===
At the city bus interchange station located near the metro station, 15 bus lines start/end or pass through: 301, 301B, 302, 306, 307, 314, 319, 400, 405, 406, 407, 411, 447, 450, 451

== Station layout ==
G	Ground	Exits/Entrances
P Platforms	Platform 2	← to Piraeus / to Ano Liosia (Pentelis)
P Platforms	Island platform, doors will open on the left
P Platforms	Platform 1	→ to Athens Airport (Pallini) →
C	Concourse	Customer Service, Tickets
P Platforms	Side platform, doors will open on the right
P Platforms	Platform 2	← to Dimotiko Theatro (Chalandri)
P Platforms	Platform 1	→ to Athens Airport (Pallini) / Terminus →
P Platforms	Side platform, doors will open on the right

== Gallery ==
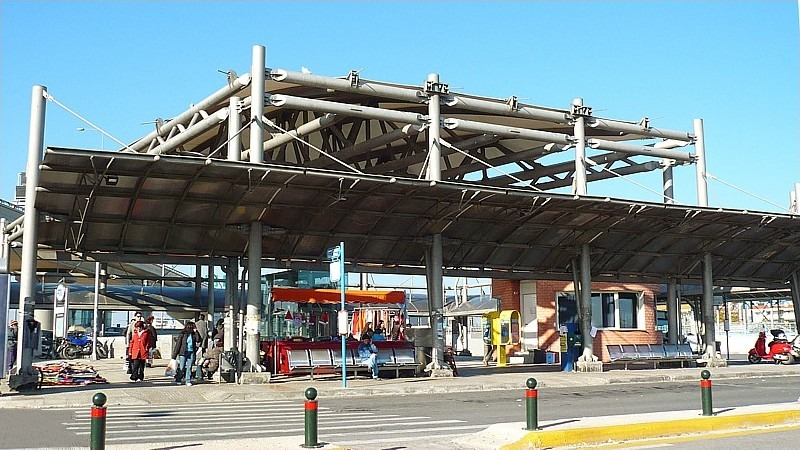
The main station buildings, December 2007

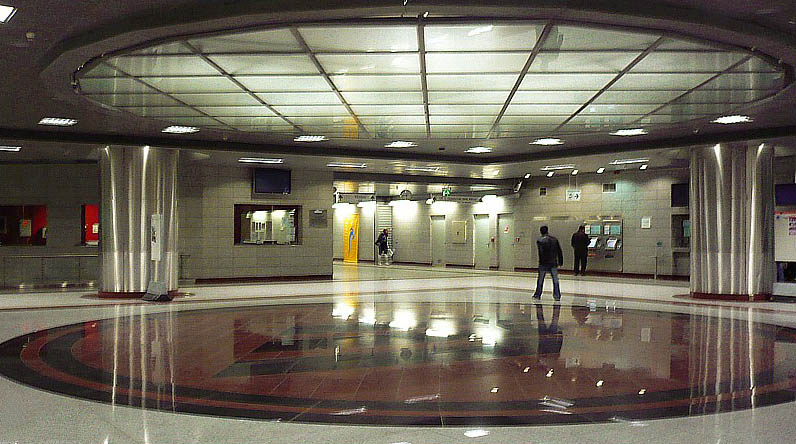
The main station concourse, December 2007

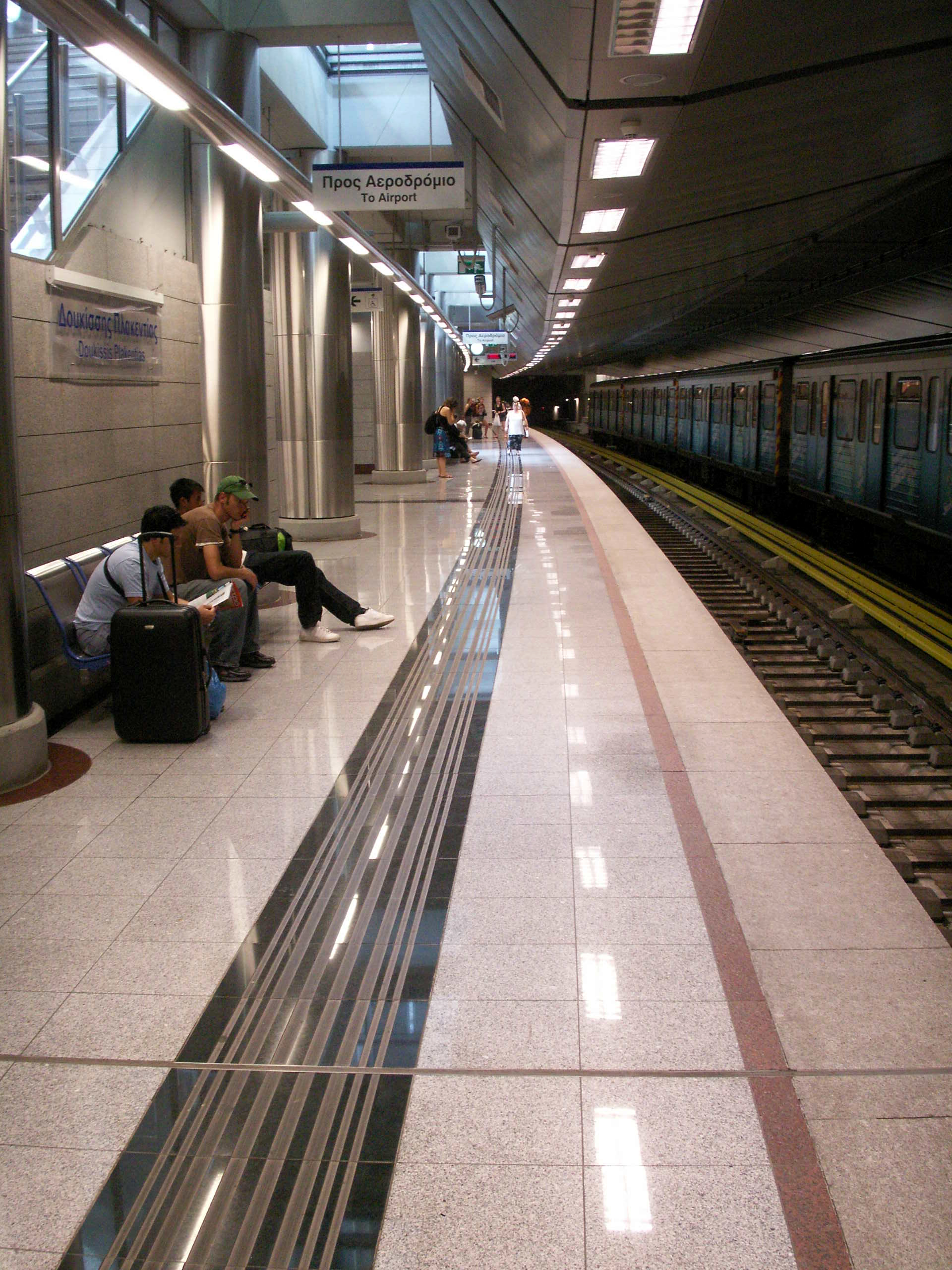
The Metro line 3 Airport Platforms, July 2006

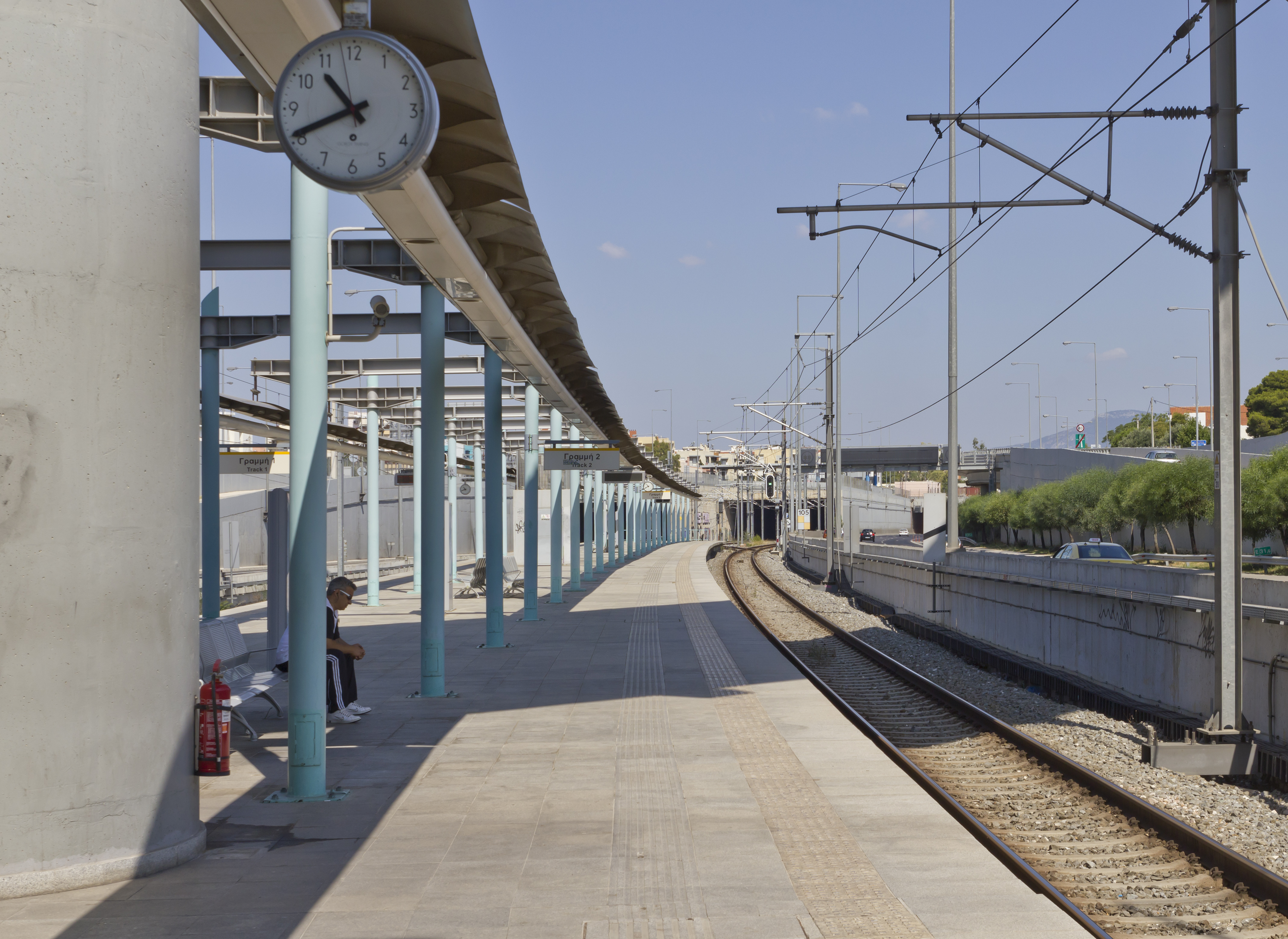
Doukissis Plakentias Suburban Railway platforms
