= Cholargos metro station =

Athens Metro station

Χολαργός Holargos
- Station platforms

General information
- Location: Cholargos; Greece
- Coordinates: 38°00′06″N 23°48′44″E
- Manager: STASY
- Line: Athens Metro Line 3
- Platforms: 2
- Tracks: 2

Construction
- Structure type: Underground
- Accessible: Yes

Key dates
- 24 July 2004: Line opened
- 23 July 2010: Station opened

Services
Preceding station	Athens Metro	Following station
Ethniki Amyna towards Dimotiko Theatro	Line 3	Nomismatokopio towards Athens Airport
Location

Cholargos (Greek: Χολαργός), also known as Holargos on signage, is a station on Athens Metro Line 3, located 22 metres below Mesogeion Avenue. The station opened on 23 July 2010.

== Station layout ==
G	Ground	Exits/Entrances
C	Concourse	Customer Service, Tickets
P Platforms	Side platform, doors will open on the right
P Platforms	Platform 1	← towards Dimotiko Theatro (Ethniki Amyna)
P Platforms	Platform 2	→ towards Athens Airport (Nomismatokopio) →
P Platforms	Side platform, doors will open on the right
