= Chalandri =

Chalandri Χαλάνδρι
- Municipality
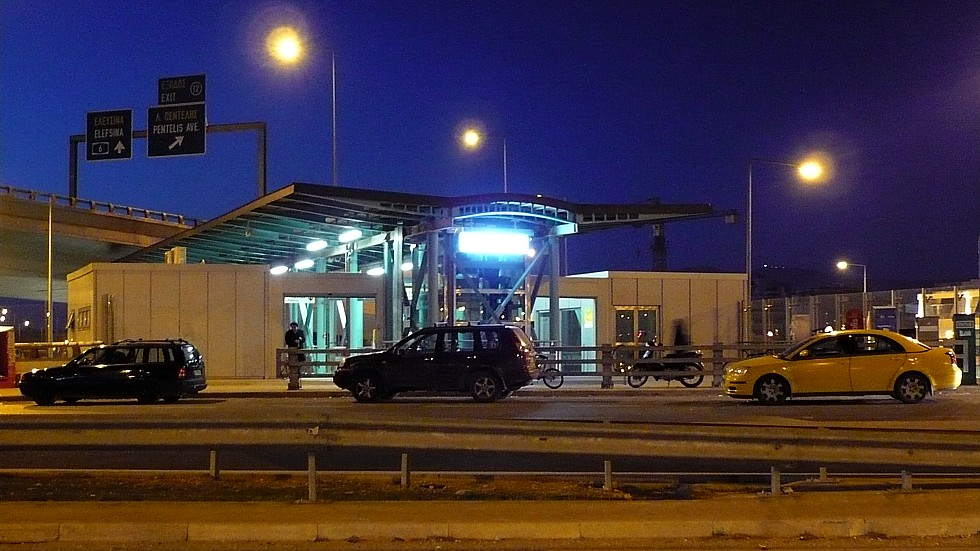
- Doukissis Plakentias Proastiakos station at Chalandri

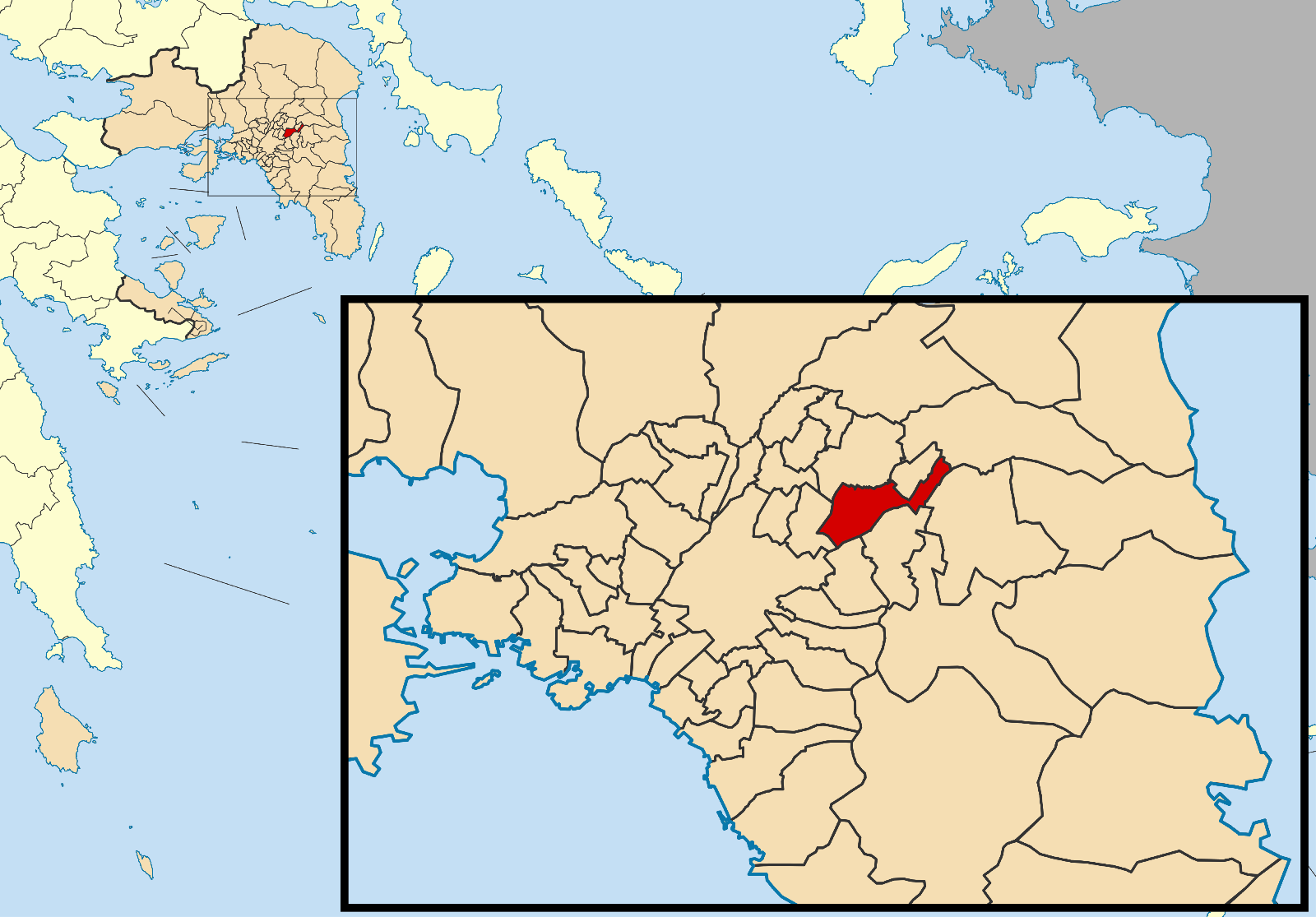

- Location within Greece
- Coordinates: 38°1′N 23°48′E
- Country: Greece
- Administrative region: Attica
- Regional unit: North Athens

Government
  - Mayor: Symeon Roussos (since 2014)

Area
  - Municipality: 10.805 km^{2} (4.172 sq mi)
- Elevation: 185 m (607 ft)

Population (2021)
  - Municipality: 77,102
  - Density: 7,135.8/km^{2} (18,482/sq mi)
- Time zone: UTC+2 (EET)
  - Summer (DST): UTC+3 (EEST)
- Postal code: 152 xx
- Area code: 210
- Vehicle registration: Z
- Website: www.chalandri.gr

Chalandri (Greek: Χαλάνδρι, Ancient Greek: Φλύα, Phlya, also Halandri, Khalandri) is a town and a suburb in the northern part of the Athens agglomeration, Greece. It is a municipality of the Attica region.

== Geography ==
Chalandri is a suburb in Northern Athens, around 12 kilometres (7 miles) from the centre; its location corresponds to one of the 10 ancient demes (boroughs) of Athens, known as Phlya (Greek: Φλύα). The municipality has an area of 10.805 km^{2}. Chalandri was a small village until the rapid expansion of Athens during the 1960s and 1970s. Its built-up area is now continuous with those of the neighbouring suburbs Filothei, Marousi, Vrilissia, Agia Paraskevi, Cholargos, Neo Psychiko and Psychiko. Nevertheless, it has still a high ratio of open green areas per citizen in the Athens agglomeration. Several embassies are based in Chalandri. It is one of the largest suburbs in terms of population, with more than 70,000 residents. It holds an independent municipality status since 1944. Chalandri is served by the Chalandri, Agia Paraskevi, Doukissis Plakentias as well as Nomismatokopio and Cholargos metro station (the latter two being shared with Papagou-Cholargos).

According to the Köppen Climate Classification system, Chalandri has a hot-summer Mediterranean climate, abbreviated "Csa" on climate maps.

=== Neighborhoods ===
- Agia Varvara
- Ano Chalandri
- Doukissis Plakentias (Neo Chalandri)
- Kato Chalandri
- Patima
- Metamorfosi
- Polydroso
- Rizarios
- Toufa (or Fragoklisia)
- Sidera
- Synoikismos
- Center Chalandri

== History ==
=== Antiquity ===
In antiquity, Chalandri constituted the ancient Athenian municipality of Phlya located in the Mesogeia of Attica county, according to the administrative division of Cleisthenes. Today it constitutes a prosperous and beautiful area in the northern sector of Athens. The bulk of the buildings have been built in the last 30 years, although Athenians have resided in Chalandri for at least a century. The administrative boundaries of the modern municipality extend from the gully of the same name to the foothills of Mount Pentelicus. Hesychios refers to the name Phlya, which comes from the verb φλει meaning fertility, as the land of Chalandri is rich in vegetation.

The municipality of Flya was first inhabited during the Prehistoric or Protohistoric Period and extends in the wider area from Psychiko and Filothei, to Vrilissia and Agia Paraskevi, i.e. the entire area enclosed by Tourkovounia, Penteli and Hymettus. The area shows evidence of settlement during the Bronze Age (2600–2000 BCE) and the Late Helladic period (1550–1100 BCE). In classical times it appears as the place of origin of many prominent citizens of the period, such as Euripides and Themistocles, while in Roman and Early Christian times it was plundered and deserted.

The installation of marble workers in the area dates back to the time of the construction of the Parthenon, when marble blocks were brought there and cut with wooden wedges, which were wet with water to make them swell. The abundant water available in the underground rivers of Halandri was the reason for their preference, a reason that until recently made the mega-marble cutting factory called 'AKROPOLIS' operate in the area, which also gave the name to the 'AKROPOLEOS' stop.

=== After the founding of the Greek State ===
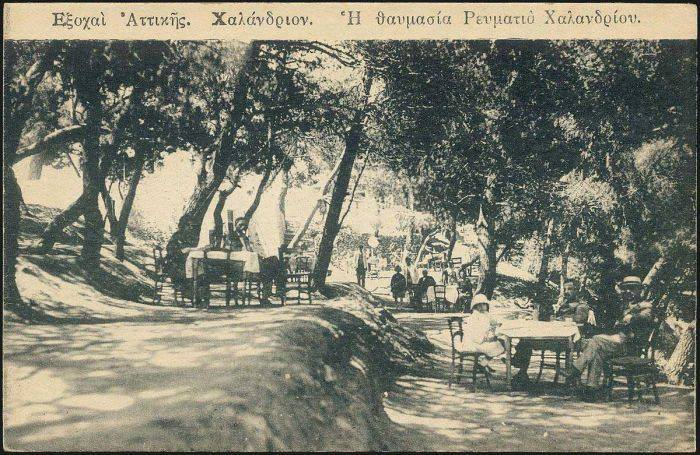
Year 1920 – coffee shop in Rema Chalandriou.

After the departure of the Turkish land owners, the pastures of Chalandri were given by distribution or by usufruct to Greek breeders and farmers. Gradually the suburb became a pole of attraction for wealthy people of the urban class of Athens, who bought plots of land with huge gardens and built two-storey villas. There were hundreds of such detached houses – villas with huge gardens until 1980, but today there are only few of them left. In the years of the modern Greek state, Chalandri appears in the administrative jurisdiction of Athens. In 1910 the first city plan was implemented and in 1925 it was detached from the municipality of Athens and recognized as an autonomous community of the East Attica Prefecture. A year later, in 1926, the building cooperative 'Agropoleion Company' was founded, which built a small area adjacent to Ymittos and was detached as the autonomous community of Cholargos. In 1929, the northeastern end of Chalandri was also seceded under the name Agia Paraskevi, but a few months later it was re-included in its administrative boundaries and retained until 1931, when the latter was recognized as the capital of the eastern prefecture.

=== Settlement of Asia Minor ===
After the Asia Minor Catastrophe, many families of Asia Minor refugees settled in the area and to commemorate the event, a Monument of Asia Minor uprooting has been erected in the park of the streets of Mikras Asias and Zalokosta, in the suburb of Chalandri. During these years, Chalandri was a huge land area with scattered single-family houses – villas (mansions), in a verdant environment of pine and plane trees. Its economy was based on livestock and crops, especially fruit trees. With the improvement of the urban plan and because of its good climate, Chalandri became a holiday resort of Athens.

=== German occupation (1941–1944) and post-war years ===
In 1941 with the German occupation, Chalandri was in a state of chaos until 1944, a date which marks the new era of Chalandri as an autonomous municipality of Attica. During the occupation, Chalandri was the headquarters of a Wehrmacht battalion, as it was a route for ELAS guerrillas to communicate from Penteli and Parnitha to Athens. In the northeastern areas of the municipality, at the foot of the mountain, lived farmers and stockbreeders who exploited the state-owned agricultural land until 1949, the year in which part of it was detached for the settlement of Vrilissia. The Municipality of Chalandri managed to keep a residential strip up to the foot of the mountain. The village is connected to the capital through the railway network that runs along Paleologos Avenue, where today there is a green space of Agia Anna. At the end of the 50's the railway network is dismantled and access is possible via Apostolopoulou Avenue, while later main roads are designated as Kifissia and Mesogeion Avenues. The Municipality of Chalandri comes full circle until it becomes part of the Athenian Urban Complex again. The taverns of Chalandri around Dourou Square, with roast lambs, piglets and hunts have gone down in history. The singer Attik and Nikos Gounaris were based in Chalandri. Their bust is on Kifissias Avenue.

=== Dictatorship-Start of immigration ===
At the beginning of the dictatorship of the Colonels, Chalandri had only 15,000 to 20,000 permanent residents. It was the area of taverns, villas and pine trees. On Penteli Avenue, 1–2 cars per minute were being driven on Penteli Avenue, since Vrilissia and Penteli had not yet been urbanized and were deserted areas. Only in and around Dourou Square it is estimated that there were at least ten famous luxury taverns, where the Athenian bourgeoisie frequented. Some of them were "Astoria" (having two "Titania" cinemas next to it), "O Mimis" (roast piglets), "O kynegos, to kynegi" (hunting goods), "O Mistos" (a tavern for barrel-feeders), etc. Chalandri had many cinemas, both winter and summer, one of which was a luxury cinema for the time, the Cine "Eleftheria" (double winter and summer) at Platonos 7, which was destroyed by fire in 1978. In this cinema, every Saturday, up-and-coming rock and pop bands of the time gave performances, which brought out famous musicians, such as Aphrodite's Child (Demis Roussos, Vangelis Papathanasiou), Vlasis Bonatsos, Kostas Tournas, etc. The booming rise of tourist arrivals during the dictatorship resulted in insufficient numbers of beds in the existing Athenian hotels and the mainly American tourists of the time were sent to the 3 small hotels of Chalandri. During this period, many jobs were created in the area, attracting new residents who migrated from other districts of Attica or other parts of Greece altogether (islands, Epirus, Peloponnese, etc.).

== From 1974 to the present ==
After the Metapolitefsi, the centre of Athens faced significant problems, such as smog, heavy traffic, demonstrations and high housing costs. Thus, in the following years, the area of Chalandri became popular for residents of the basin seeking better living conditions than those in athens. Due to the large size of the municipality, the slow and gradual integration of its land into the urban plan and its inaccessible economic character, Chalandri continues to be built up to this day. But the damage has already been done. It is estimated that 90% of its trees have been cut down, 95% of its single-family mansions have been demolished, and of course its quaint taverns. In their place came multi-family houses, mega department stores, arcades, corporations, pedestrian walkways, etc. In the modern history of the city of Chalandri, a particularly prosperous municipality has now been formed that manages to combine its commercial strength with meeting the housing needs and the employment of staff and small traders.

The commercial pedestrian street of the city is considered to be, along with Kifissia, one of the most popular destinations of the wider region and not only, while in 2007 the Ministry of Economy and Finance was relocated to an area of the Municipality.

== Historical population ==
Year	Population
1981	54,320
1991	66,285
2001	71,684
2011	74,192
2021	77,102

The village was historically Arvanitika speaking, with 3,000 Arvanites inhabiting it, however due to its proximity to Athens, it has undergone a language shift. After the 1922 Asia Minor Catastrophe and the 1923 Greco-Turkish population exchange, some Greek refugees settled in the town.

== Culture ==
=== Education ===
American Community Schools is located in Chalandri.

=== Sports ===
Sport clubs of Chalandri with presence in Greek national divisions are AE Chalandriou (Athlitiki Enosi Chalandriou), GS Chalandriou (Gymnastikos Syllogos Chalandriou) and Nireas Chalandriou. The municipality of Chalandri has also created an extensive channel of sports installations such as tennis courts, football pitches, volleyball and basketball indoor and outdoor courts and also an indoor and outdoor olympic-size swimming pool to enhance the athletic spirit of the inhabitants.

There is an extensive bike route, covering the neighbourhoods from Doukissis Plakentias metro station, to Vrilissia and Gerakas area, reaching Chalandri city centre.

Sport clubs based in Chalandri
Club	Founded	Sports	Achievements
AE Chalandriou	1939	Football	Earlier presence in Beta Ethniki
GS Chalandriou	1981	Basketball	Presence in Beta Ethniki basketball
Nireas Chalandriou	1989	Water Polo	Earlier presence in A1 Ethniki

== See also ==
- List of municipalities of Attica
