= STASY =

Operator of metro and tram services in Athens

Coordinates: 37.98310°N 23.72755°E

Urban Rail Transport S.A. (STASY)
- Native name: Σταθερές Συγκοινωνίες
- Romanized name: Statheres Synkoinonies
- Type: Anonymi Etaireia (SA)
- Predecessors: Attiko Metro Operation Company; Athens–Piraeus Electric Railways; Tram S.A.
- Founded: 17 June 2011; 15 years ago in Athens, Greece
- Headquarters: Athinas 67; 105 52 Athens, Greece
- Area served: Greater Athens
- Key people: Charalampos Damaskos (CEO)
- Owner: Transport for Athens (100%)
- Website: stasy.gr

Urban Rail Transport S.A. (Greek: Σταθερές Συγκοινωνίες, romanized: Statheres Synkoinonies, ΣΤΑΣΥ - pronounced as στάση "bus/train stop" Greek pronunciation: [ˈstasi]), commonly abbreviated as STASY, is a Greek public transport operator of the Athens Metro and the Athens Tram. It is the metro and tram subsidiary of Transport for Athens (OASA S.A.), and is responsible for the operation and maintenance of the metro and tram network, including rolling stock, 59 tram stops, and 62 of the 66 metro stations.

STASY was created in 2011, as a merger of the Athens–Piraeus Electric Railways (ISAP), the Attiko Metro Operation Company (AMEL), and Tram S.A., and its logo is an amalgamation of the oval-shaped format of ISAP's logo, and the blue and green colours from AMEL's logo.

== History ==
On 28 February 2011, the Greek Government enacted Law 3920/2011, which allowed the Attiko Metro Operation Company (AMEL) to merge with the Athens–Piraeus Electric Railways (ISAP) and Tram S.A. to form Urban Rail Transport S.A., or STASY as it is commonly known. The merged company, which came into effect on 17 June 2011 under Ministerial Decree 28737/2637, became a subsidiary of Transport for Athens (OASA). ISAP's headquarters at 67 Athinas Street, near Omonoia Square, became the headquarters of STASY.

Three different companies used to operate and maintain the Athens Metro and Athens Tram network before the creation of STASY:

- Line 1 of the Metro used to be operated by the Athens–Piraeus Electric Railways (Greek: Ηλεκτρικοί Σιδηρόδρομοι Αθηνών Πειραιώς; ISAP): ISAP was created as a public company on 1 January 1976, to replace the privately owned Hellenic Electric Railways (EIS). ISAP came under the authority of OASA in 1998.
- Lines 2 and 3 of the Metro used to be operated by the Attiko Metro Operation Company (Αττικό Μετρό Εταιρεία Λειτουργίας; AMEL): AMEL was created on 15 February 2001, as an operational subsidiary of public transport developer and constructor Attiko Metro (now Elliniko Metro), instead of OASA.
- The Athens Tram used to be operated by Tram S.A. (ΤΡΑΜ Α.Ε.). Founded in March 2001, Tram S.A. was also a subsidiary of Attiko Metro, instead of OASA.

== Operations ==
STASY is responsible for the operation and maintenance of the Athens Metro and the Athens Tram, including the infrastructure, rolling stock, 59 tram stops and 62 of the 66 metro stations. GAIAOSE and Greek Railways own and maintain the surface section of Line 3 between Doukissis Plakentias and Athens Airport, and the operator of the Athens International Airport manages the Airport station.

== See also ==
- Elliniko Metro
- Transport for Athens (OASA)
