= Dimotiko Theatro metro station =

Athens Metro station

Δημοτικό Θέατρο Dimotiko Theatro Δημαρχείο Dimarcheio
- Station platforms

General information
- Location: Vasileos Georgiou A' and Iroon Polytechneiou; 185 32 Piraeus; Greece
- Coordinates: 37.942905°N 23.647350°E
- Manager: STASY
- Line: Athens Metro Line 3
- Platforms: 2 (Line 3); 1 (Tram)
- Tracks: 2 (Line 3); 1 (Tram)
- Connections: Athens Tram Athens Tram Line 7

Construction
- Structure type: Underground (Line 3); At-grade (Tram)
- Accessible: Yes

Key dates
- 15 December 2021: Tram stop opened
- 10 October 2022: Metro station opened

Services
Preceding station	Athens Metro	Following station
Terminus	Line 3	Piraeus towards Athens Airport
Preceding station	Athens Tram	Following station
Akti Poseidonos Terminus	Line 7 Loop westbound only	Plateia Deligianni One-way operation
Location

Dimotiko Theatro (Greek: Δημοτικό Θέατρο, lit. 'Municipal Theatre') is a station in Piraeus, Greece. It is the southwestern terminus of Athens Metro Line 3. It opened on October 10, 2022, as part of the Line 3 extension to Piraeus.

== History ==
The station was first planned along with the rest of the Haidari-Piraeus extension in 2000 and was planned to be located between Piraeus and Evangelistria. In February 2009, construction of Evangelistria station was cancelled, thus making Dimotiko Theatro the planned terminus of the extension. Construction started in 2012 and was due to be completed in 2017 but was pushed back to 2022, mainly due to problems regarding the construction of Piraeus station. The TBM arrived at Dimotiko Theatro on November 28, 2017.

== Entrances ==
The station has three entrances. One at Venizelou Square, one at Korai Square and one at Pavlou Bakoyianni Square. The entrances at Venizelou and Korai Square are ADA accessible.

== Tram stop ==
The tram stop that connects with Dimotiko Theatro is called Dimarcheio (Greek: Δημαρχείο), after the nearby town hall of the Piraeus Municipality. It is located between the two halves of Korai Square.

Dimarcheio opened on 15 December 2021, as part of the extension of the Athens Tram to Piraeus: Dimarcheio is part of the Piraeus loop, and serves westbound Line 7 trams towards Akti Poseidonos, which opened on 18 February 2026.

== Station layout ==
Level; L1	Platform 1	← towards Akti Poseidonos (Terminus)
Level; L1	Side platform, doors will open on the left
G Ground	-	Exits
C Concourse	Concourse	Customer Service, Tickets
Level; L4	Side platform, doors will open on the right
Level; L4	Platform 2	→ For use by inbound trains
Level; L4	Platform 3	→ towards Athens Airport (Piraeus) →
Level; L4	Side platform, doors will open on the right

== Gallery ==
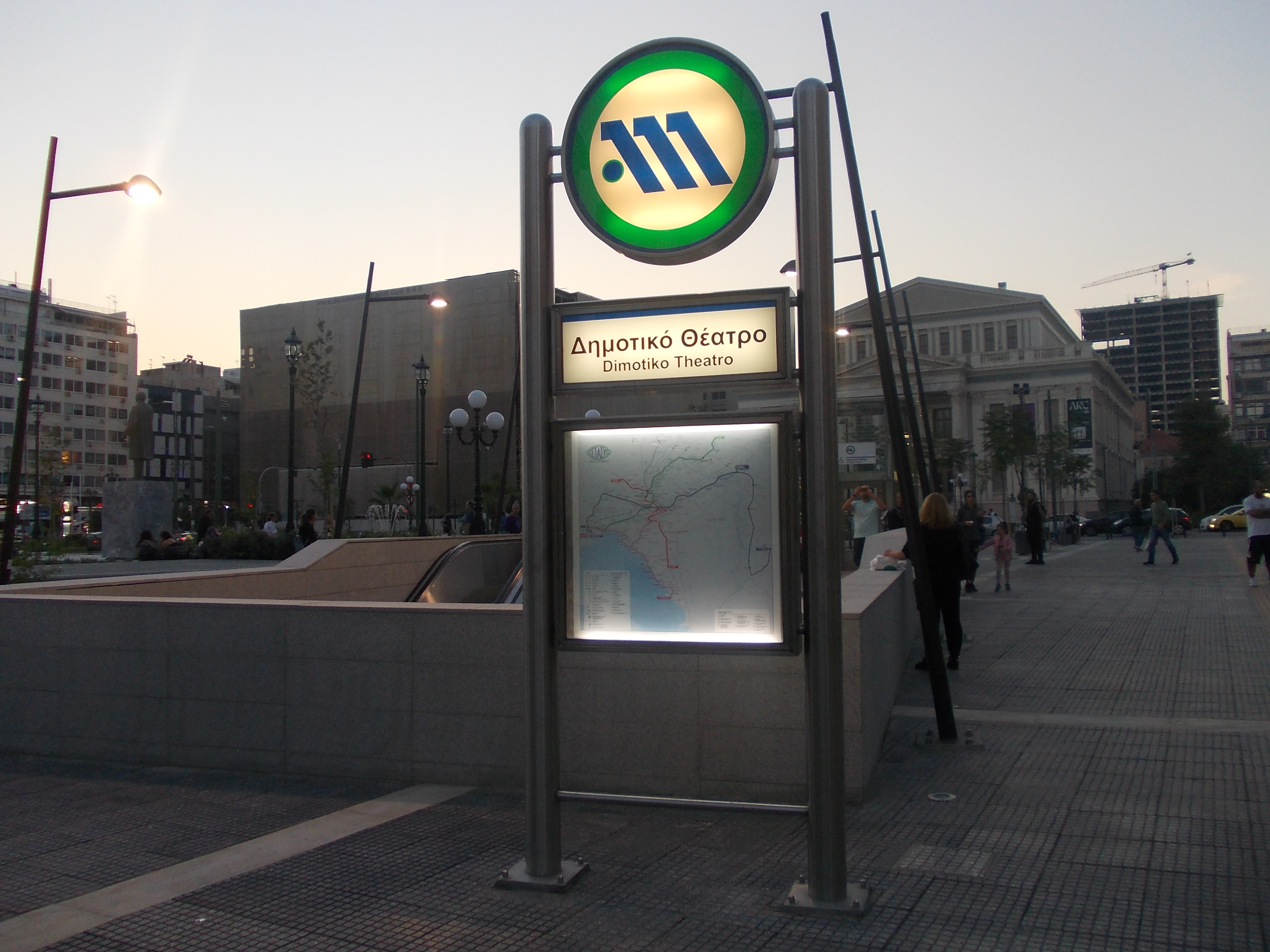
Sign at the station entrance

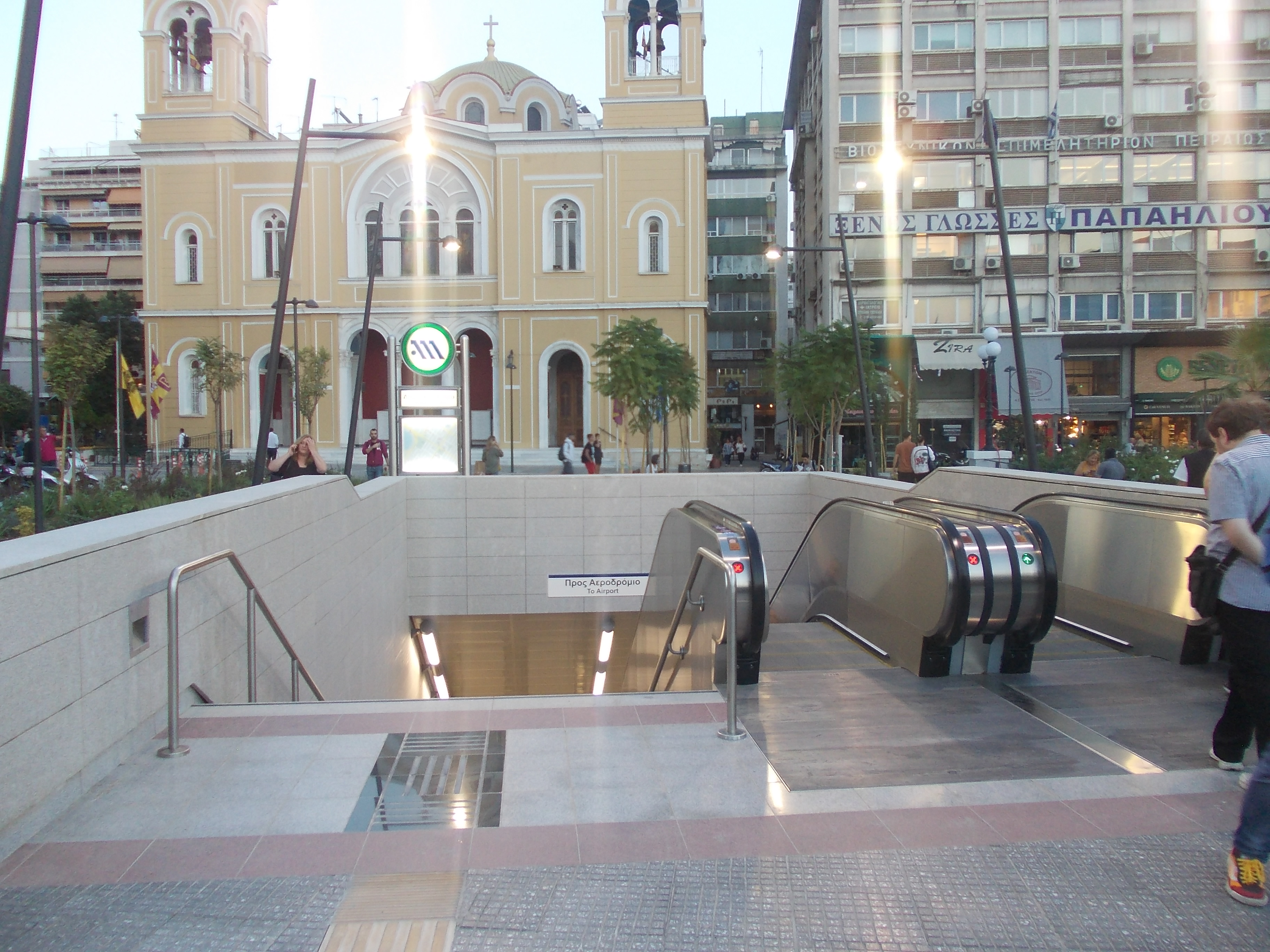
Entrance at Venizelou Sq.

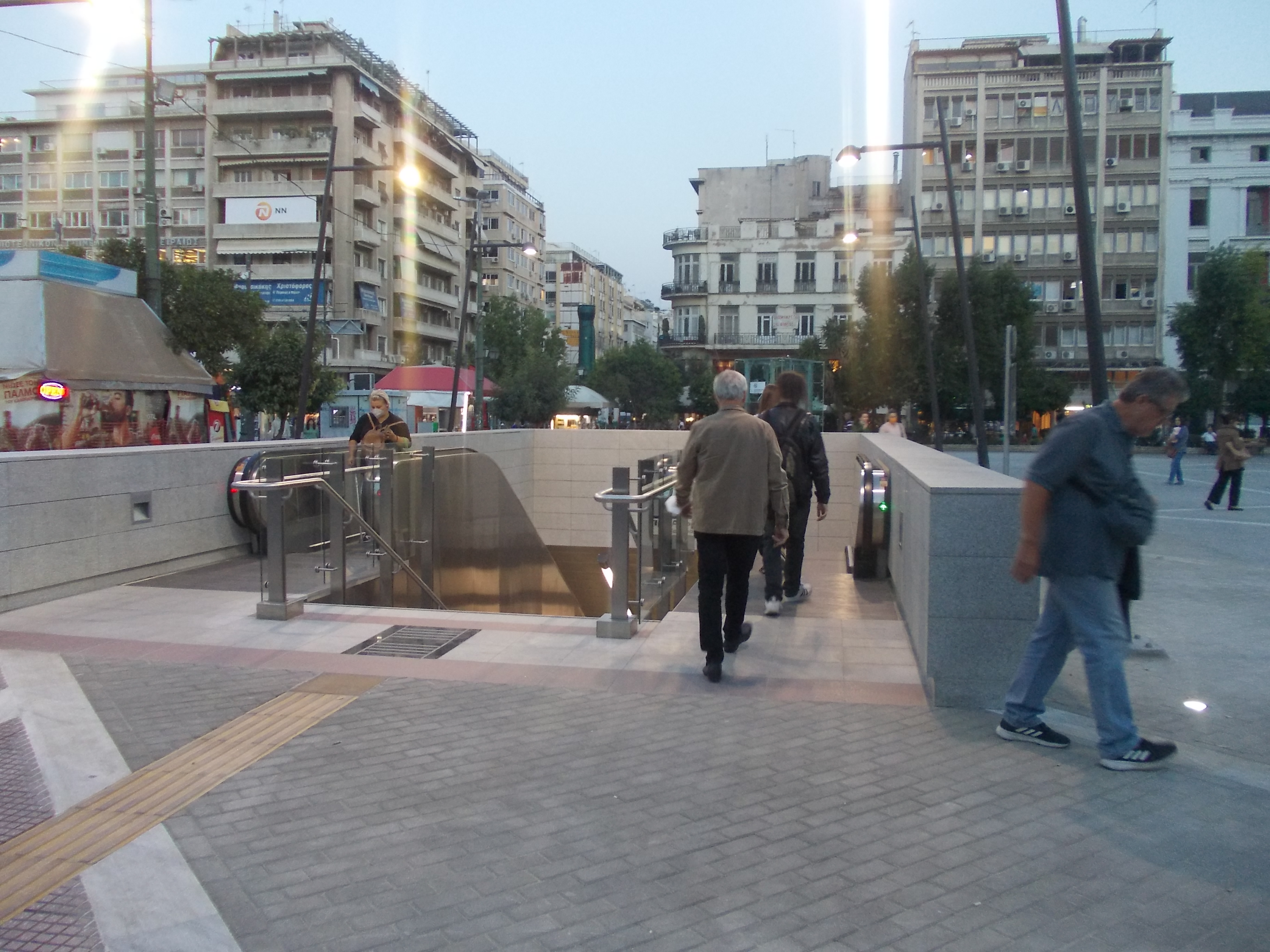
Entrance at Korai Sq.

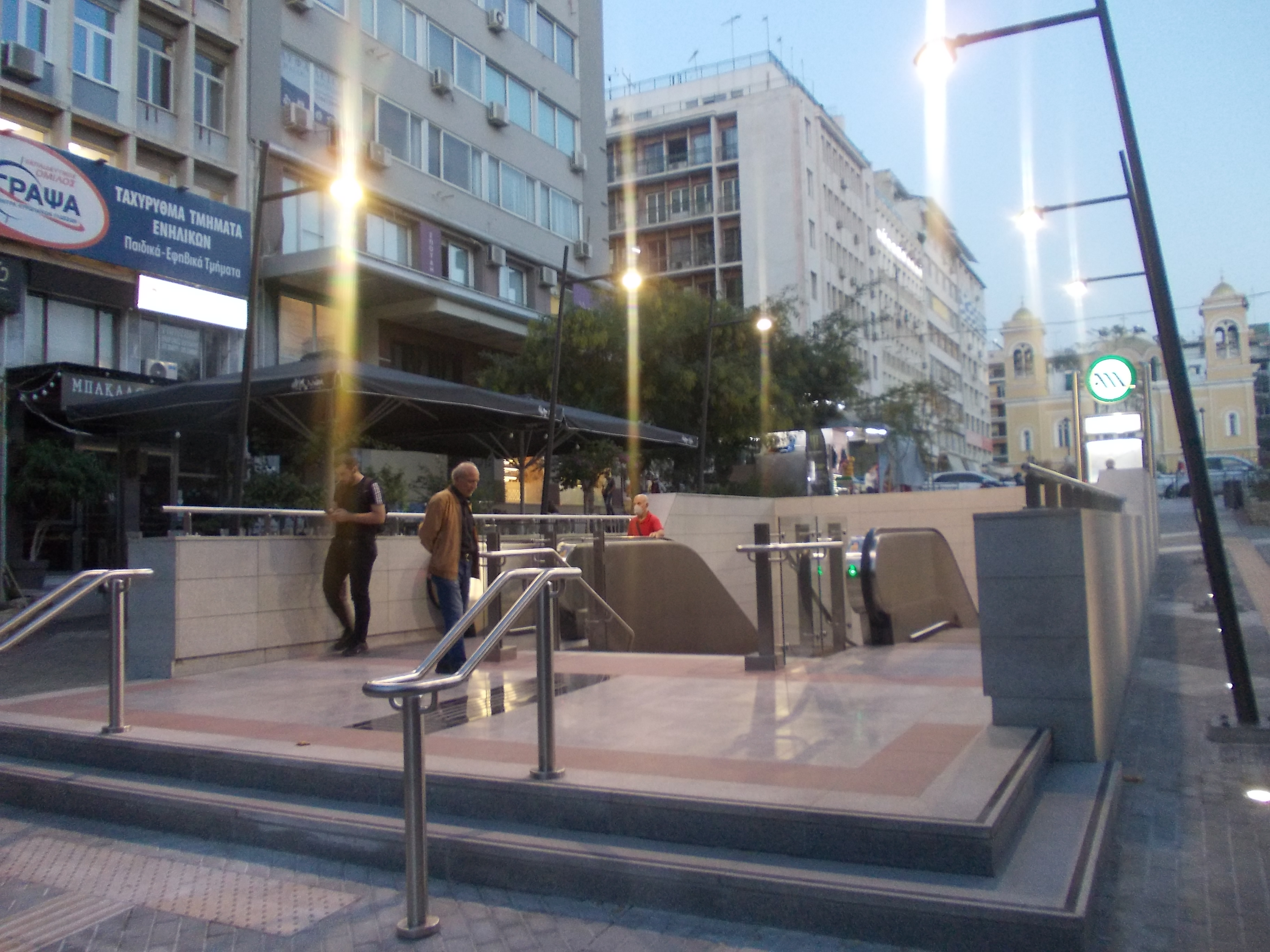
Entrance at Pavlou Bakoyianni Sq.

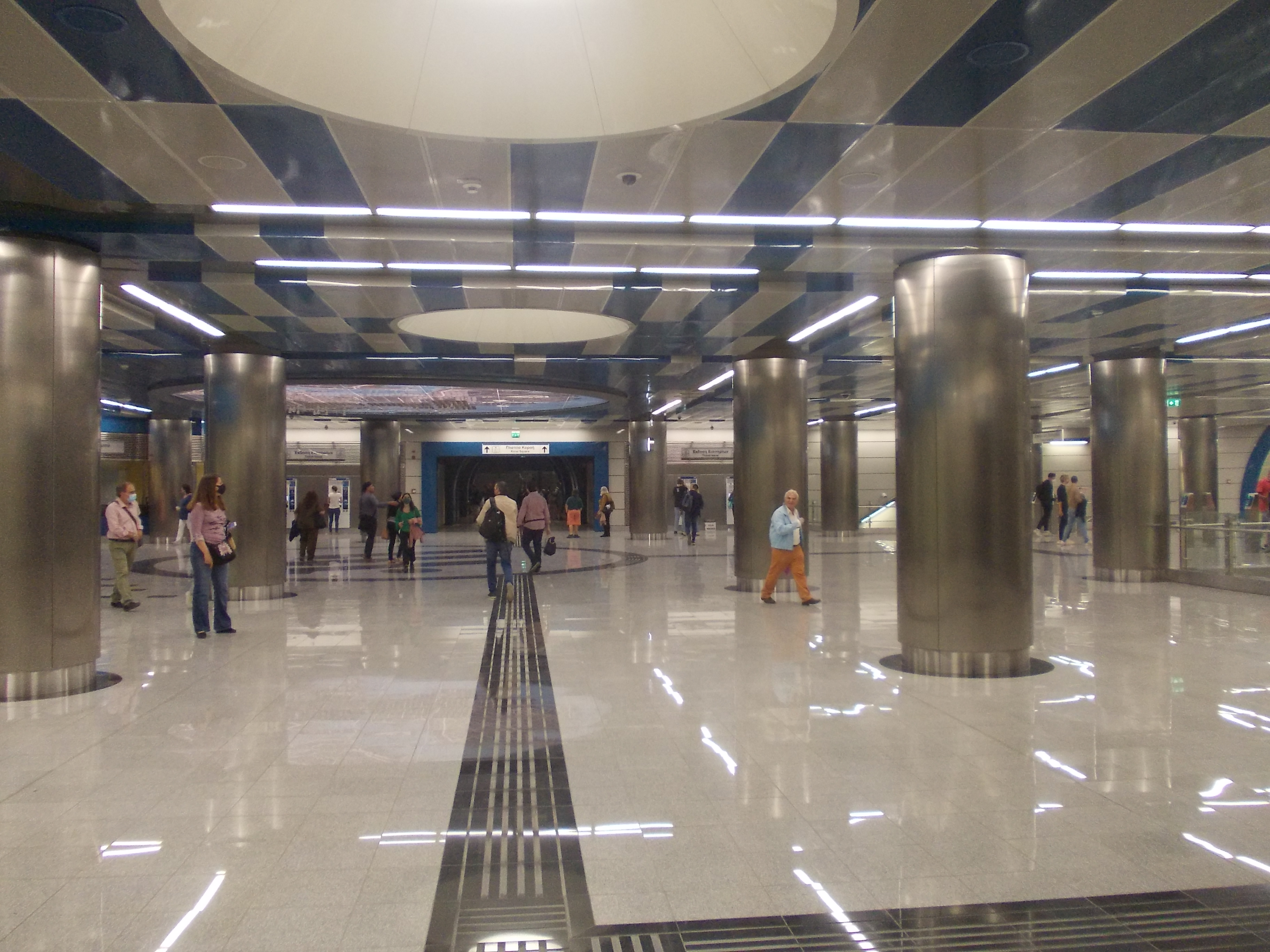
The station's concourse level

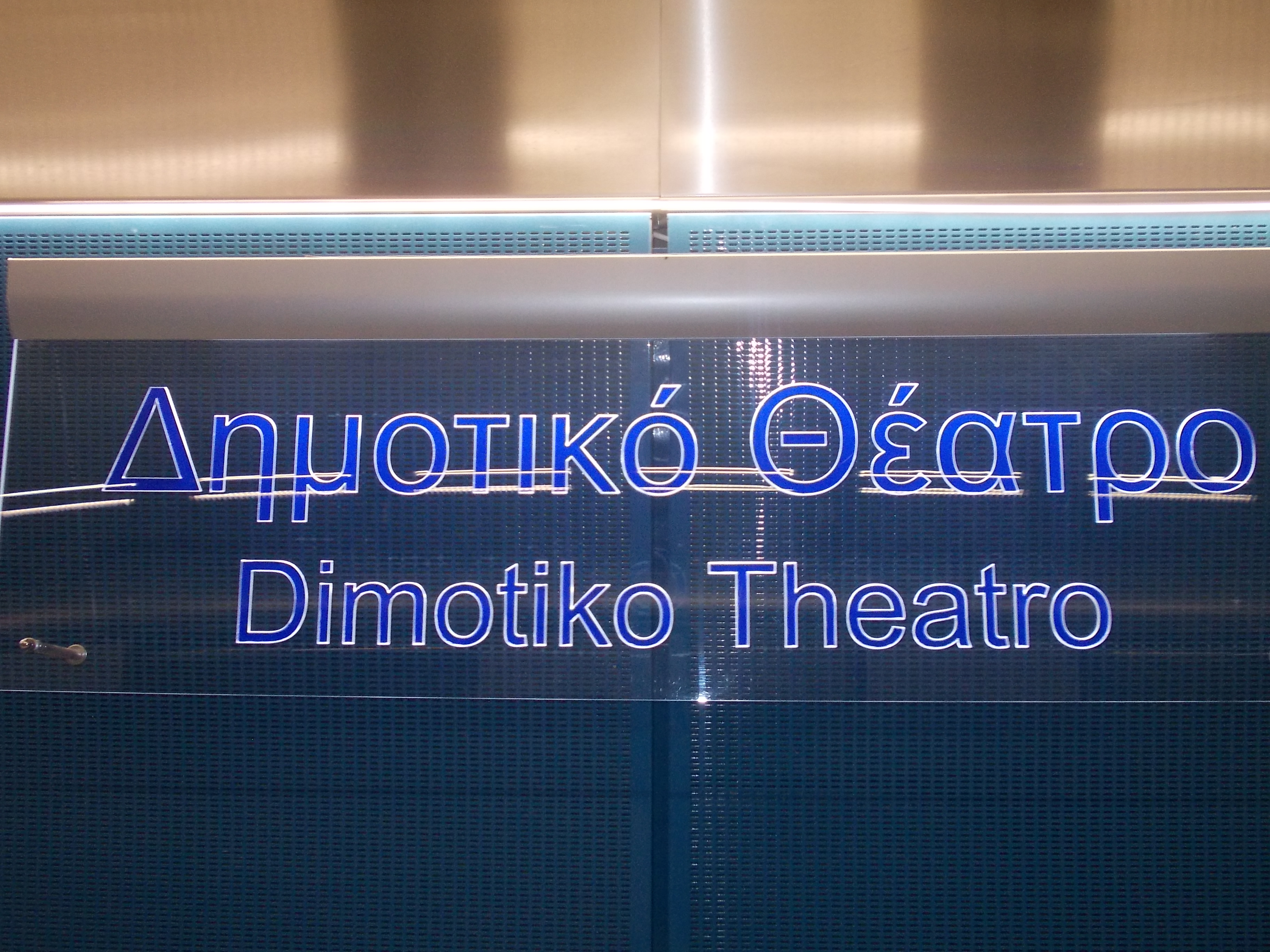
Station's sign on the platforms
