= Kotzia Square =

Coordinates: 37°58′54″N 23°43′40″E

- Πλατεία Κοτζιά
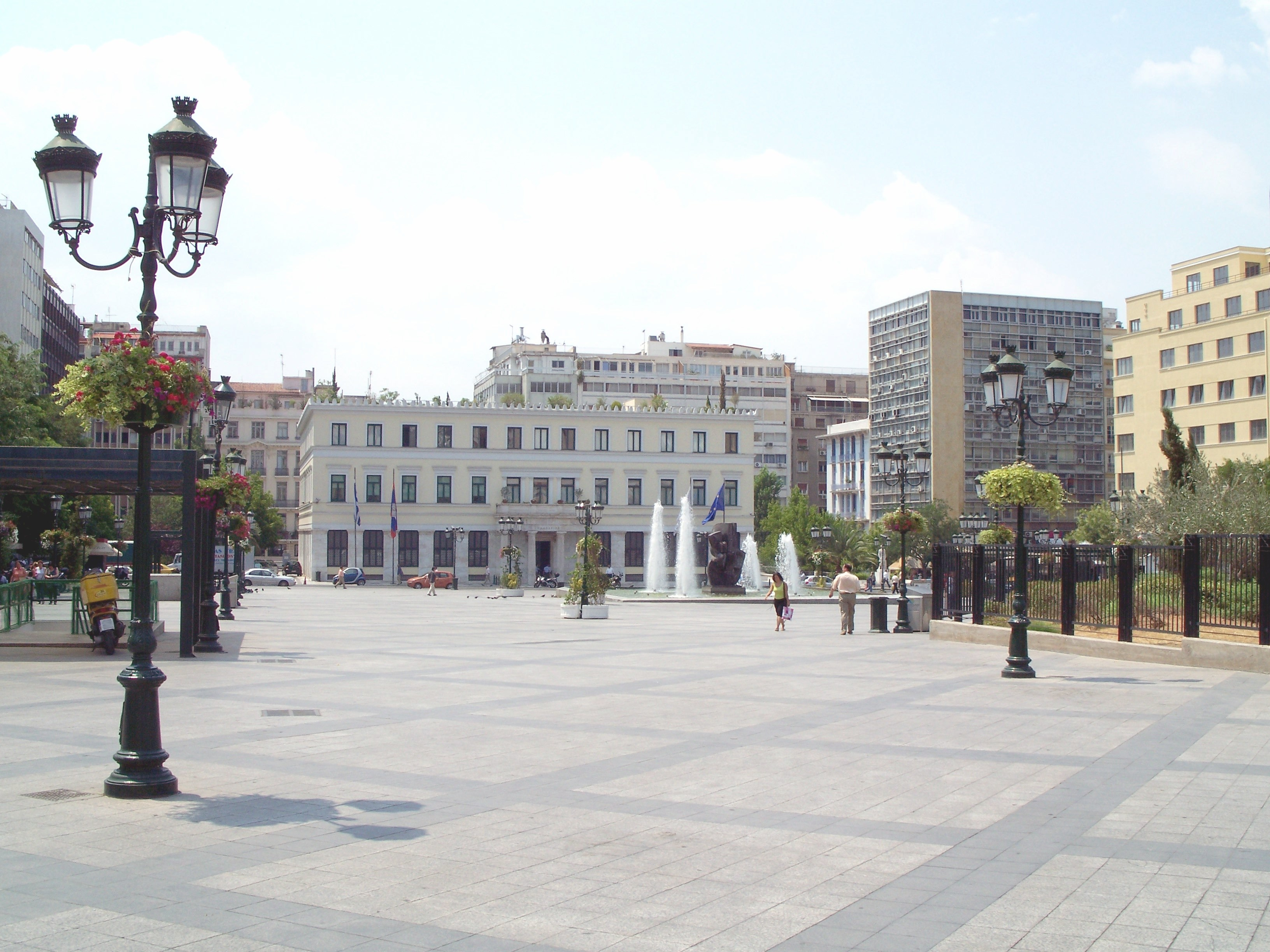
- Interactive map of Kotzia Square
- Former names: Ludovic Square

General information
- Type: Open square
- Architectural style: Neoclassicism
- Location: Athens, Greece

Kotzia Square (Greek: Πλατεία Κοτζιά) is a square in central Athens, Greece. The square retains several characteristics of 19th-century local neoclassical architecture, such as the City Hall of the Municipality of Athens and the National Bank of Greece Cultural Center. It is named after Konstantinos Kotzias, former Mayor of Athens.

== Location ==
The square is surrounded by the following streets: Efpolidos Street to the north, Athinas Street to the west, Kratinou to the south, and Aiolou Street from the east. The square itself is south of Omonia Square and north of Monastiraki square.

Kotzia square lies in front of the City Hall of the Municipality of Athens, (designed by Panagis Kalkos) and is decorated with busts of famous Athenians such as Pericles and Solon.

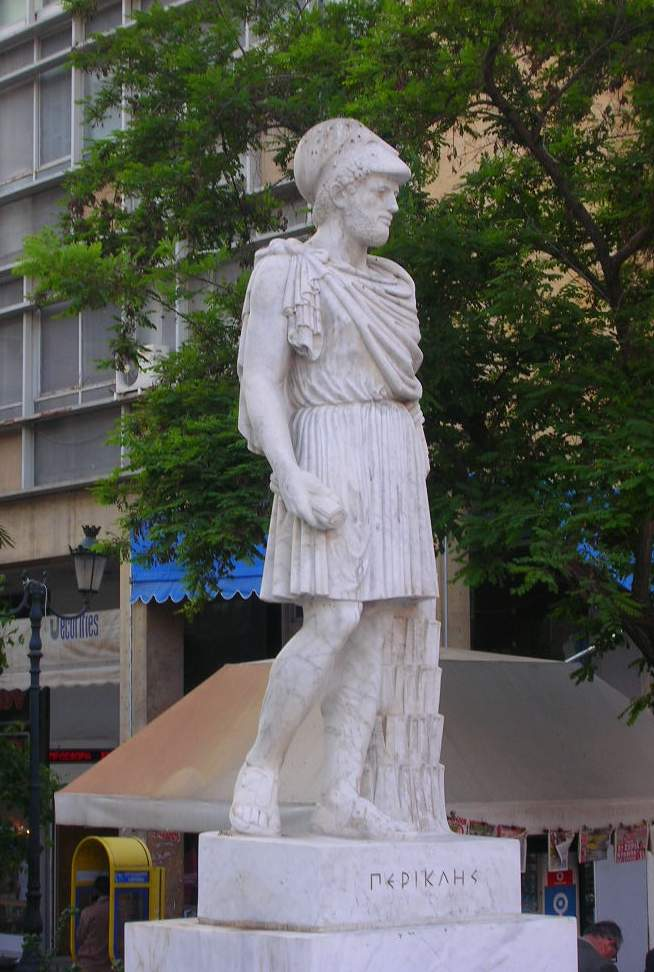
A statue of Pericles.

== History ==
Ludovic Square ca. 1900

Built in 1874, the square was formerly known as Loudovikou Square. During the 2004 Summer Olympics, it served as the start and finish venue of the Athens historic centre circuit for the men's and women's road race events, as well as for various artistic events.

== Excavations ==
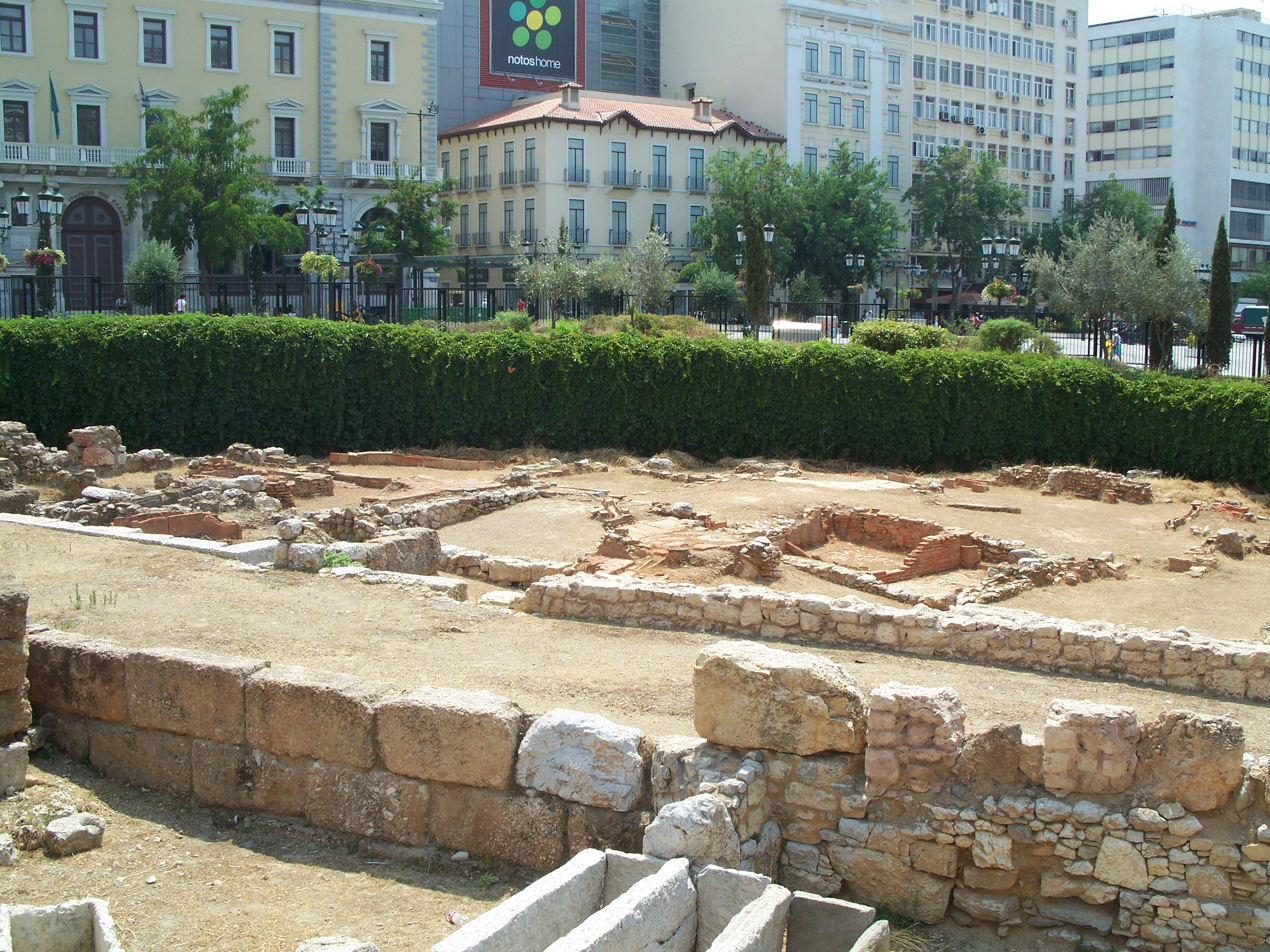
Antiquities on display at Kotzia square: tombs, an ancient street and parts of the city's fortifications.

In the middle of Kotzia square classical antiquities have been uncovered that include a large part of an ancient road, tombs and a small building. The square is situated just outside the ancient Acharnian Gate of Classical Athens. It was called Acharnian because through it passed the road to the Acharnai. There are remains of the city wall as well as extended parts of the front rampart and the moat.
