= Victoria metro station, Athens =

Athens Metro station

Βικτώρια Victoria
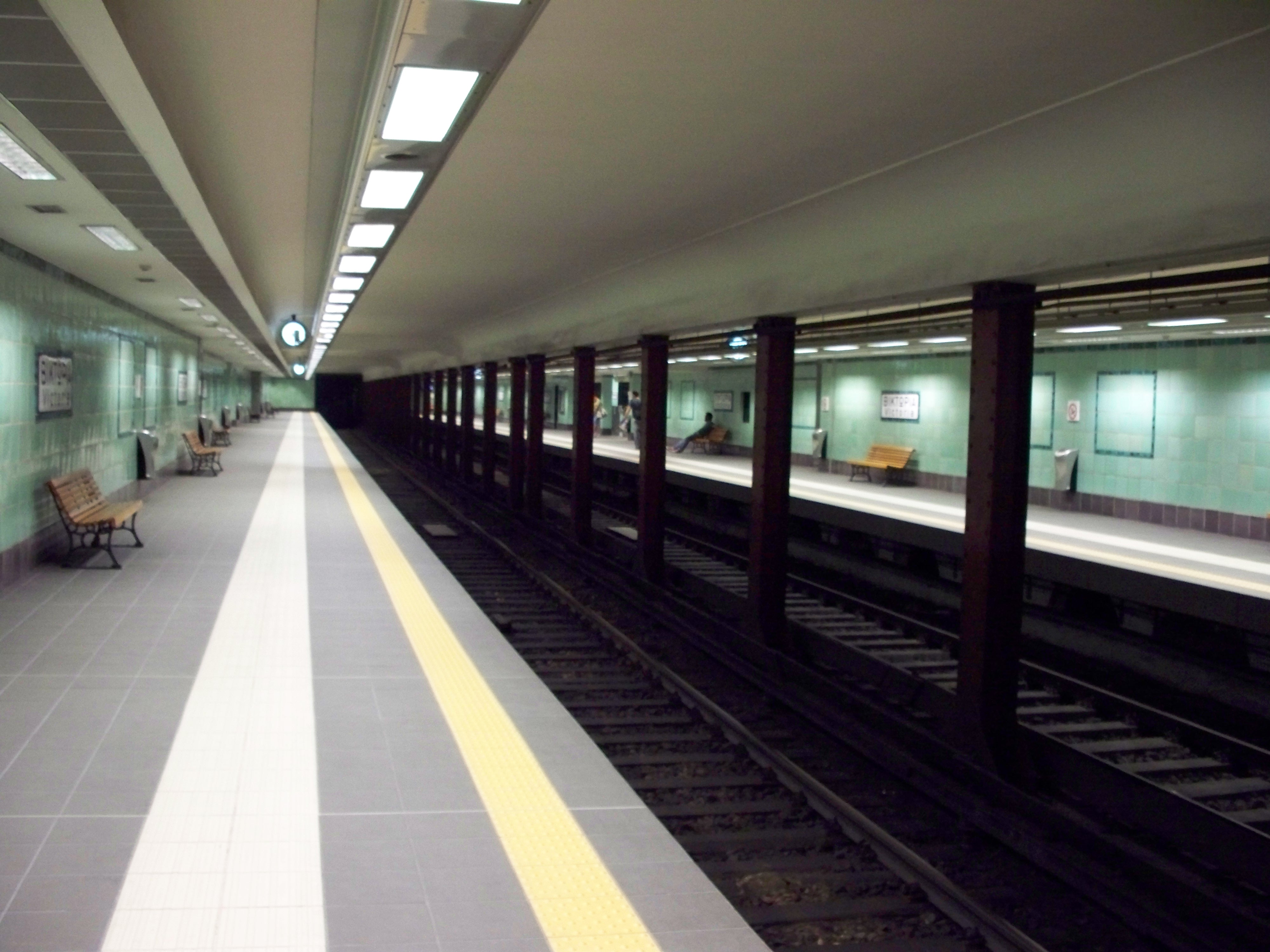
- Station platforms

General information
- Location: Victoria Square; 104 34 Athens; Greece
- Coordinates: 37.992960°N 23.730195°E
- Manager: STASY
- Line: Athens Metro Line 1
- Platforms: 2
- Tracks: 2

Construction
- Structure type: Sub-surface underground
- Accessible: Yes

Key dates
- 1 March 1948: Opened
- 11 July 2004: Rebuilt

Services
Preceding station	Athens Metro	Following station
Omonia towards Piraeus	Line 1	Attiki towards Kifissia
Location

Victoria (Greek: Βικτώρια, Viktoria) is on Athens Metro Line 1, between Omonia and Attiki. It is named after the British monarch Queen Victoria.

The station is underground, beneath Victoria Square, and was recently renovated. It is the first underground station of the northern group of Line 1 stations. The central station, Omonia, is also underground. The architectural style of the station is Art Deco and the walls are covered with light blue tiles in contrast with the tiles of the Omonia station, which are dark yellow.

Before and after the renovation, the station's name is shown in big white labels that were made in Germany by Emaillierwerk Gottfried Dichanz. The concept of the station is very similar to the stations in Berlin, the stairs in this concept go directly to the street.

Victoria station is at few minutes walking distance from the National Archaeological Museum of Athens, the Hellenic Motor Museum, the Athens University of Economics and Business and to Pedion tou Areos park.

== Station Layout ==
G
Street level
- Entry/Exit
- Victoria Square
B1
- Customer service
- Tickets
Side platform
Southbound
← towards Piraeus (Omonia)
Northbound
towards Kifissia (Attiki) →
Side platform

== Gallery ==
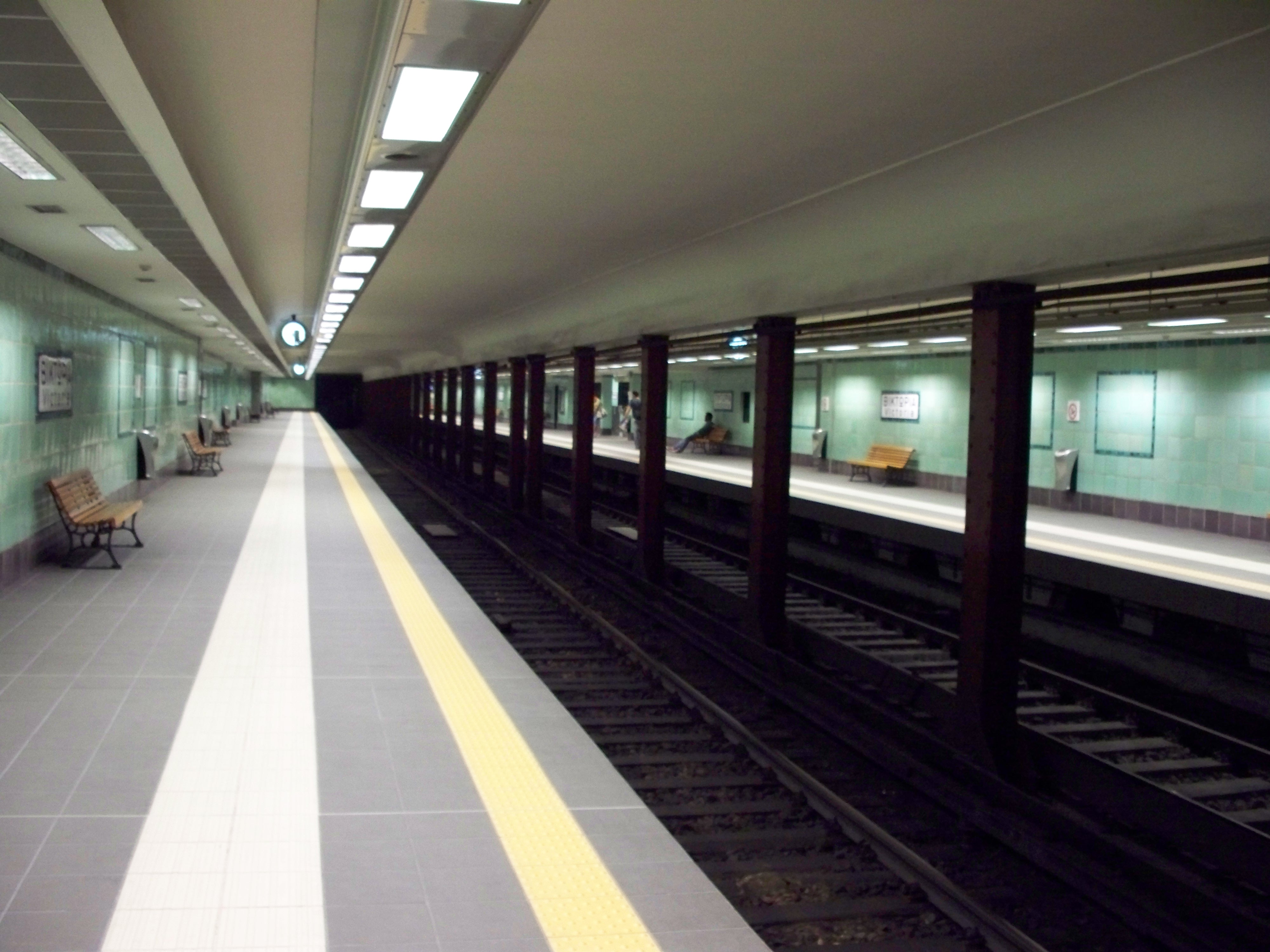
Platforms

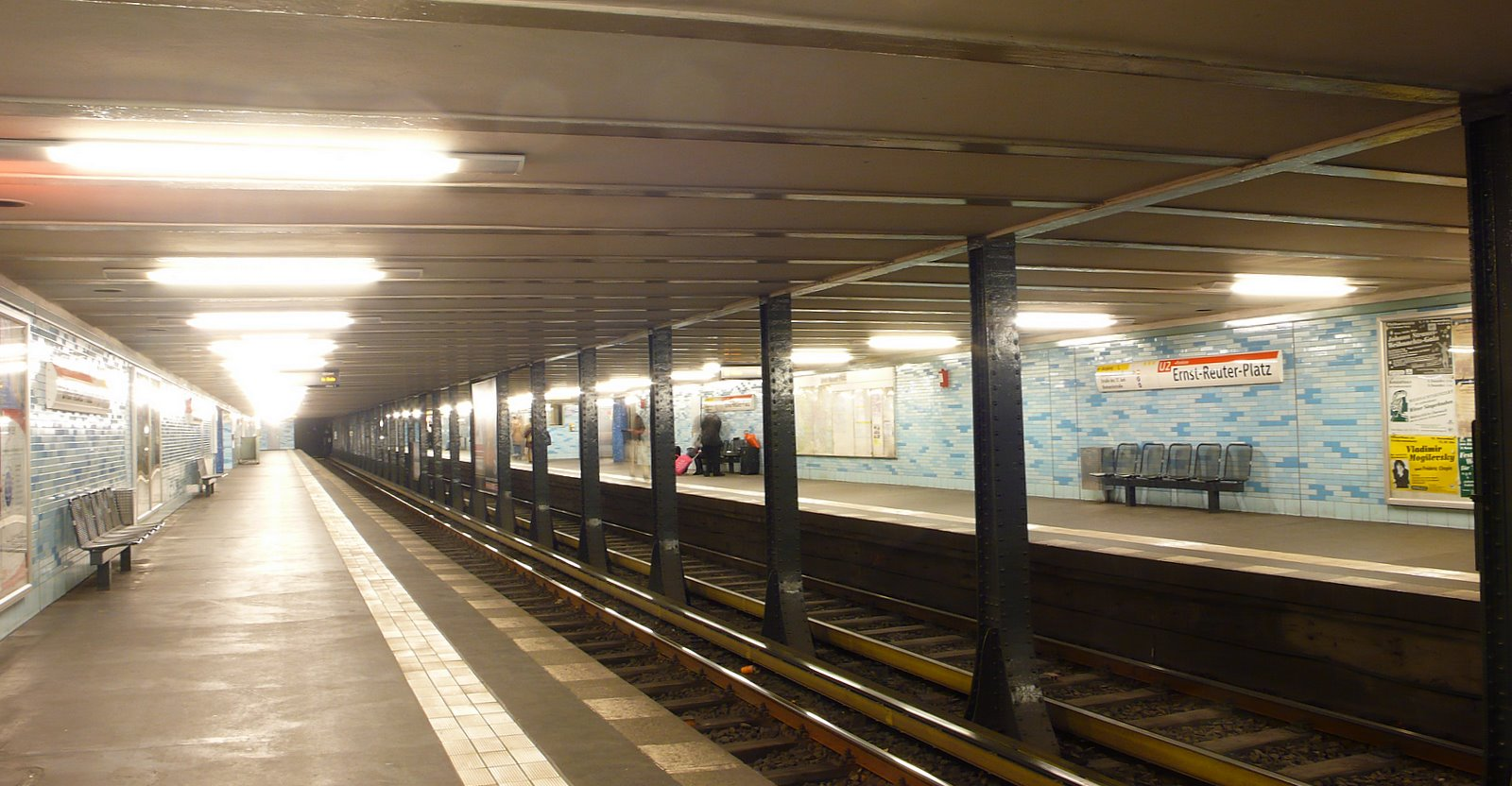
The similar station Ernst-Reuter-Platz in Berlin
