= Athinas Street =

Street in Athens, Greece

Coordinates: 37.9802°N 23.7271°E

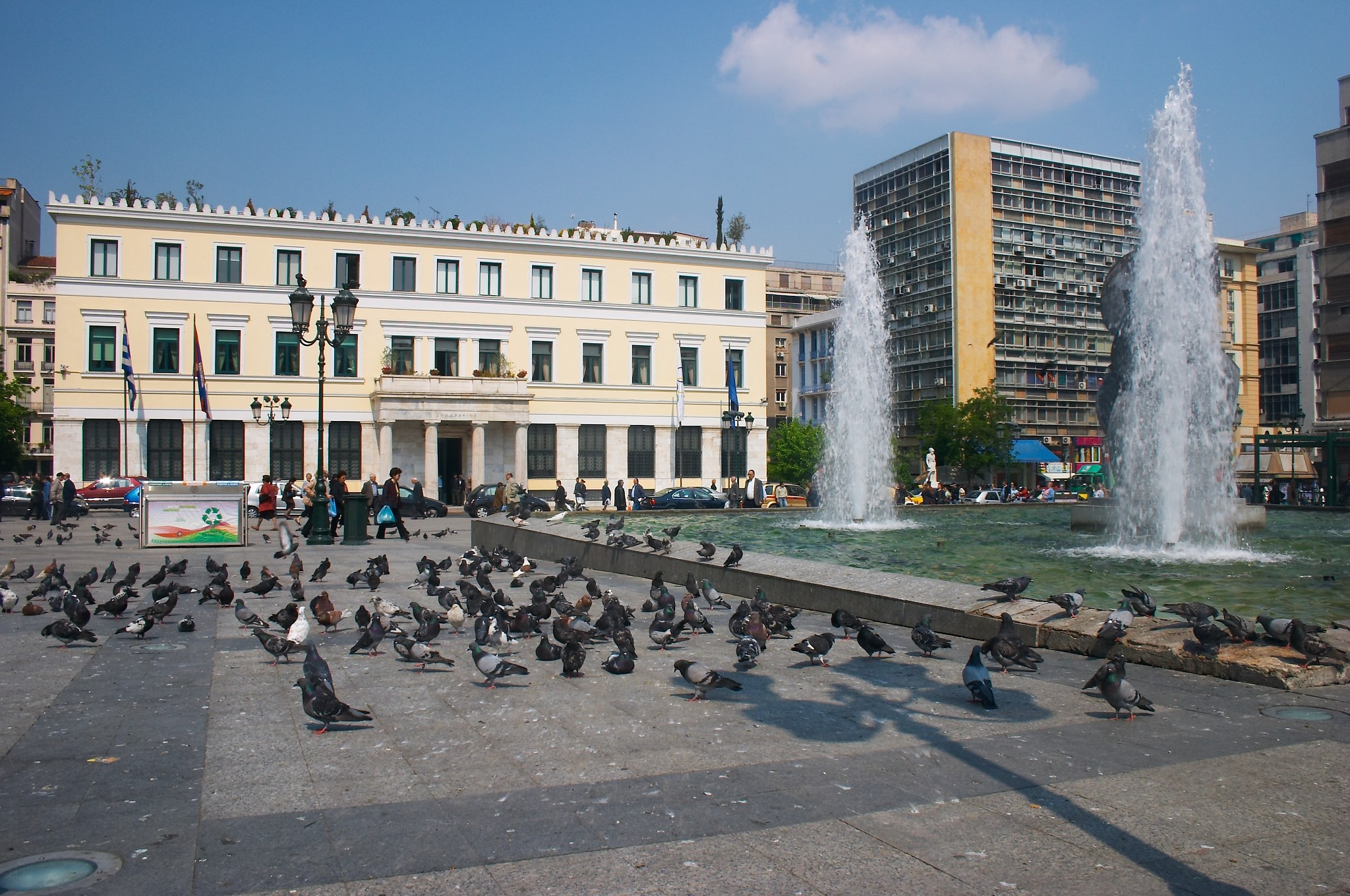
Athinas Street as it enters Kotzia Square with Athens City Hall in the background

Athinas Street (Greek: Οδός Αθηνάς) is a street in downtown Athens in Greece. It is named after Athena, the goddess of wisdom. The street runs from Ermou Street north to Omonoia Square through the Psiri neighborhood. Its total length is nearly 1 km of which 80 m is a walkway since 1999. Until 1999, it used to access with Omonoia Square, now motorists can now access it via Lykourgos Street east to Aiolou and 28 Oktovriou (Patissi) Street and other streets. North of Lykourgos is a pedestrian walkway. It has two lanes of traffic and room for curb parking.

Famous buildings includes the Athens City Hall on the west side and office towers northward. The Modern Agora is east of Athinas Street. Kotzia Square lies to the east with Karamanou Square also on the east. Shops and residential buildings lies to the south with neo-classical buildings. In the middle of Athinas street is the Varvakeios municipal market. The oldest market in Athens The rest of the architecture except for the city hall and square are modernistic. Metro Line 1 runs underneath Athinas street for its entire length.

In June 2008, the Mayor of Athens, Nikitas Kaklamanis, ordered the street pedestrianised. The street will be closed to most traffic and emphasis will be given to making it one of Athens' greenest streets.

== History ==
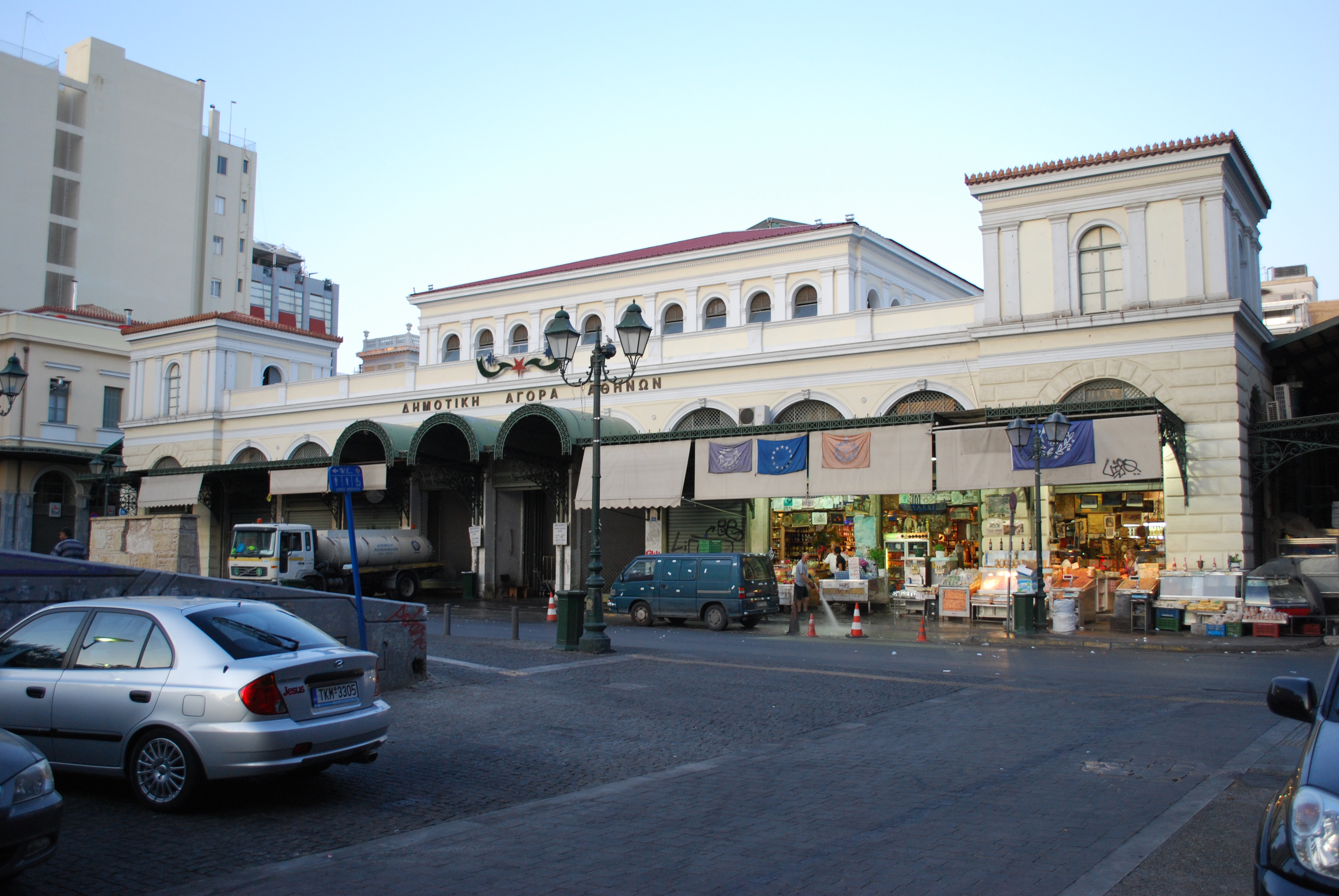
The municipal market on the street

The road was first paved in the late-19th century. Modernistic buildings were added in the 1950s to the north and later, street lights and traffic lights were posted at the used intersections including Ermou, Evrypidou, Sofokleous and Lykourgos. In the 1990s, smaller lampposts were posted and the northern section along with Omonoia was under reconstruction and a section became a walkway, pedestrian traffic lights were added with full access to the Omonia metro station.

== Intersections ==
In order from south to north

- Ermou Street
- Agiis Eirinis Street - east
- Voreou Street - east
- Protogenous Street - west
- Vyssis Street - east
- Pallados Street - west
- Vlachava Street - east
- Evrypidou Street
- Aristogenous Street
- Armodiou Street
- Sofokleous Street
- Kratinou Street - east
- Kotzia Square
- Efpolidos Street - east
- Lykourgos Street - east
- Omonoia Square
