= Kerameikos metro station =

Athens Metro station

Κεραμεικός Kerameikos
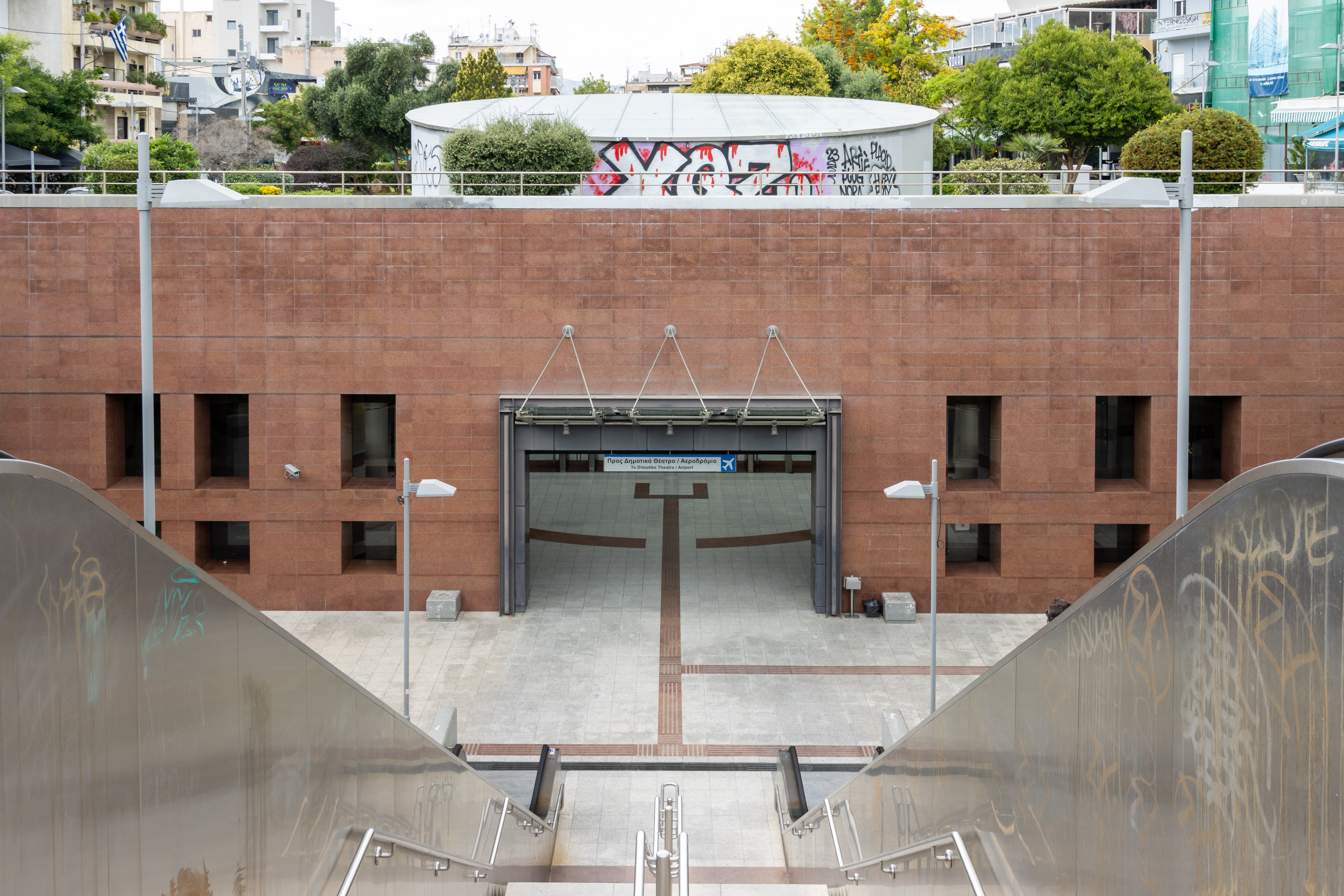
- The station entrance in 2023

General information
- Location: Athens; Greece
- Coordinates: 37°58′42.7″N 23°42′41.2″E
- Manager: STASY
- Line: Athens Metro Line 3
- Platforms: 2
- Tracks: 2

Construction
- Structure type: Underground
- Accessible: Yes

Key dates
- 26 May 2007: Opened

Services
Preceding station	Athens Metro	Following station
Eleonas towards Dimotiko Theatro	Line 3	Monastiraki towards Athens Airport
Location

Kerameikos (Greek: Κεραμεικός) is a station on Athens Metro Line 3. It opened on 26 May 2007 as part of the Egaleo extension.

== History ==
Proposals for a metro station at Kerameikos started with the Second Smith Study of 1974, and was reaffirmed by the SOFRETU proposal of 1978. Kerameikos was originally part of the original "Olympic Metro" scheme of the Athens Metro, and the station was supposed to be located south-west of the junction with Iera Odos and Peiraios Street. However, construction on the station stopped in 1998, due to an archaeological dispute. Construction of Kerameikos resumed at a new location in Gazi, and the original station box became an underground car park.

== Station layout ==
G
Street level
Exits
B1
Concourse
- Customer Service
- Tickets
B2
Side platform, doors will open on the right
Platform 1
← to Dimotiko Theatro (Eleonas)
Platform 2
to Athens Airport (Monastiraki) →
Side platform, doors will open on the right
