= Omonia metro station =

Athens Metro station

Ομόνοια Omonia
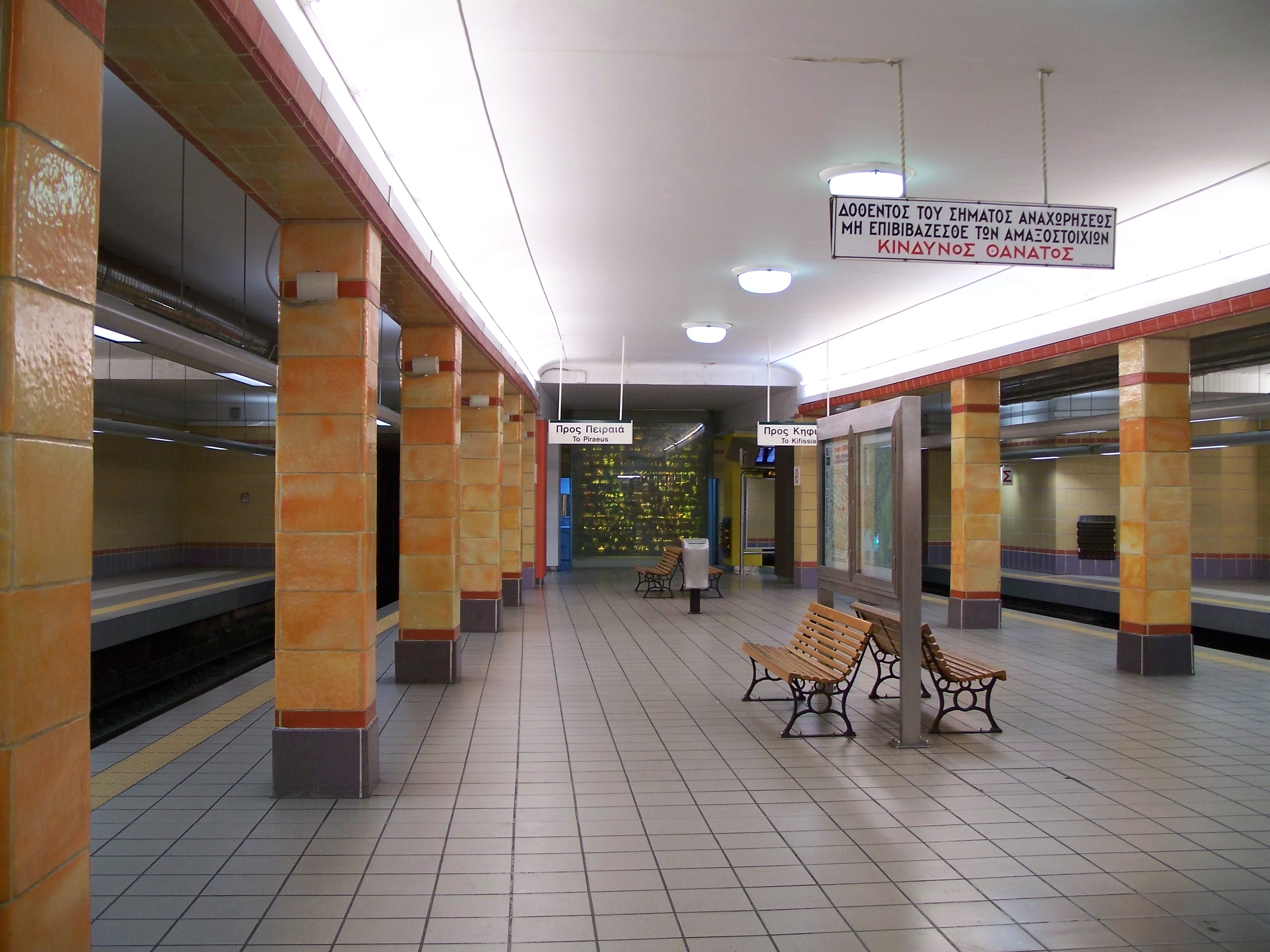
- Line 1 platforms

General information
- Location: Omonoia Square; 104 31 Athens; Greece
- Coordinates: 37.984030°N 23.727970°E
- Transit authority: STASY
- Line: Athens Metro Line 1 Athens Metro Line 2
- Platforms: 3 ESP sol. (Line 1); 2 side (Line 2)
- Tracks: 4

Construction
- Structure type: Underground
- Platform levels: 2
- Accessible: Yes (portable boarding ramp recommended for Line 1)

Key dates
- 17 May 1895: Line 1 station opened
- 21 July 1930: Line 1 station resited
- 28 January 2000: Line 2 station opened

Services
Preceding station	Athens Metro	Following station
Monastiraki towards Piraeus	Line 1	Victoria towards Kifissia
Metaxourgeio towards Anthoupoli	Line 2	Panepistimio towards Elliniko
Former services
Preceding station	Former railways	Following station
Terminus	Lavrion Square–Strofyli Railway	Attiki towards Strofyli
Terminus	Athens–Lavrion Railway	Attiki towards Kalogreza or Lavrion
Location

Omonia is an underground Athens Metro station located below Omonia Square, in the center of the city. It serves as one of two transfer stations between Line 1 and Line 2. It took its name from Omonia Square and the surrounding area of the same name.

The first station opened in 1895, but was relocated underground and redesigned by the Hellenic Electric Railways (which operated Line 1 at the time) in 1930. In January 2000 the additional platforms for Line 2 were opened.

== History ==
=== Outdoor station (1895) ===
The first station «Omonia» was inaugurated on May 17, 1895, the same day as Monastiraki station, and was a part outdoor and part semi-underground station, of the open trench type, at the intersection of Lykourgos and Athinas streets, 100 meters before Omonia Square. The extension of the line to the north was done in order for Athens itself (the current center of Athens) to acquire railway stations, because Thiseio station was then at the southern end of the capital, as the urban fabric then started north from the Ancient Agora, from Monastiraki and after. The choice of tunnel construction in the Monastiraki - Omonia section was made in order to avoid the division of the urban fabric of Athens and in fact it was the first chronologically tunnel and remains the oldest tunnel in the total of the current 3 lines of the Athens Metro network.

Initially, when the relevant studies started, there was a dilemma whether the line should be extended to Omonia Square or to Klathmonos Square, with the intermediate station in Monastiraki having been decided to build from the beginning, regardless of the choice of the terminal point. Finally, it was decided that the construction of a station in Omonia would be a more correct choice, as Omonia was already clearly a more popular meeting point for the residents of Athens.

It was built as a new terminal to the north of the then steam-powered railway line Thiseio - Piraeus (electrified in 1904), which eventually evolved into the original section of the later line 1 of the metro network. Of course, due to the age of the event, the construction of the tunnel, which began to be built in 1889, was done by the «cut-and-cover» method, that is, excavation and coating, along Athinas Street, as at that time it had not yet appeared, on a global scale, the technology known today as the tunnel boring machine (TBM). Finally, the tunnel was completed, together with the construction of the first, outdoor station of Omonia, as well as the station in Monastiraki, in May 1895. The old station of Omonia was used for 35 years and then (when the underground station was inaugurated in 1930) it was covered and since then it has been used as a depot, while above it the administration building of the oldest company of ISAP was built and completed in 1963, now a building of STA.SY. (Fixed Transportation).

=== Underground station (1930) ===
The location of the first station was deemed unsuitable for extending the network of the railway line to the north (as it had not been oriented to the north - northeast in such a direction to enable the tunnel to continue to be excavated along 3rd September Street, but in a north - northwest direction where there was already, since then, dense building construction in Omonia Square) and, for this reason, in January 1928 a new, entirely underground station began to be built under Omonia Square, 100 meters north of the original one. The new station was inaugurated by Prime Minister Eleftherios Venizelos on July 21, 1930. The construction of the Omonia underground station in 1930 was done by excavation to a depth of 8 meters and overlapping (method «cut-and-cover») and was accompanied by a redevelopment of the homonymous square. The station itself then received the praise of the press, but also of Venizelos himself, for its construction quality and luxury.

The new Omonia station was built according to the aesthetic standards of the then Berlin Metro stations, with the most typical example being the tiles (here especially orange in color) on the walls, as was also the case with the next Victoria station to the north. Both before and after the renovation (of 2003 in Omonia and of 2004 in Victoria), the names of both these stations appear on large white plates, which were built in Germany by Emaillierwerk Gottfried Dichanz.

Omonia station was until the network extension to Victoria station on March 1, 1948, the northern terminus of the line. The historical irony, however, is that the extension of the tunnel to the north and the construction of Victoria and Attiki stations took place and were almost completed in the 1930s, but due to the subsequent war events the inauguration was postponed and finally took place on March 1, 1948 for Victoria and on June 30, 1949 for Attiki.

The current Omonia station of Line 1 is at kilometer 9,981 from Piraeus station. Its current form dates back to 2003, as important upgrading works were carried out in view of the 2004 Athens Olympic Games. The initial study approved in 2001 provided for a more modern version of upgrading the station, with its walls covered with Kavala marbles, as the then management of the then ISAP wanted to upgrade it to the standards of the stations of lines 2 and 3 of the Metro network. However, after the official announcement of the study, as it became public knowledge at the time, the Panhellenic Union of Architects reacted strongly in May 2001, which requested that the station (as well as the one in Victoria) be declared a preserved monument, while in fact a large number of architects launched appeals against the regeneration study, with the request of «need to preserve the historical memory of the Athenians», as they claimed. This request was then examined by the Central Council of Newer Monuments of the Ministry of Culture and was finally accepted, as it was considered that the original form of 1930 was «aesthetically remarkable» and that «the historical memory of the Athenians is valuable» (but it was probably also accepted to unblock the project of regeneration in time, as the time of the countdown to the 2004 Olympic Games was pressing then).

As a result of this approval, on 11 December 2001 the station of line 1 was declared a preserved monument by the Central Council of Newer Monuments and so the redevelopment was done while maintaining its original architecture, without any change from its original form, with the exception of the installation of a ground paving in place of the older cement paving and the reinforcement of the lighting with new lighting elements, although the original circular lamps (ceiling lamps) were also preserved on the roof. But because some of the original orange tiles on the walls were broken due to age and it was not possible to find tiles of the same orange color shade (the factory in Berlin that had then built them no longer existed, while a related international survey carried out in 2002 did not yield result finding the same tiles), despite only a slightly different shade (towards yellow and less «shimmering» texture than the original), several walls exhibit heterochromia.

The opening of the current format of the station took place on March 19, 2003. A direct consequence of this declaration was that just 1 month later, on January 15, 2002, the next northbound station, Victoria, was declared a listed monument because it has similar tiles on the walls, albeit in light green instead of orange. Soon, too, all Line 1 stations gained telematics and were equipped with digital information displays for waiting time to arrival of trains.

=== Modern Line 2 metro station (2000) ===
As part of the creation of a wider metro network, in the period 1992 - 2000, the first sections of two new metro lines, line 2 and line 3, were built. Line 2 was planned to pass through the Omonia station of line 1, turning it into a transfer station. The tunnel of line 2 passes at a lower level than that of line 1. The part of Omonia station that currently serves line 2 was inaugurated on January 28, 2000. It is located at a lower level than the platforms of line 1, at a maximum depth of 33 meters (its platforms), while it has two side platforms.

== Interchanges ==
Trolleybuses	1	2	3	4	5	6	11	12	15
Trolleybuses	21								
Buses	A7	A11	A13	B9	B11	021	022	035	049
Buses	051	054	057	060	224	227	608	622	732
Buses	813	815	838	856	914				
Buses	Night Buses	500	790						

== Station layout ==
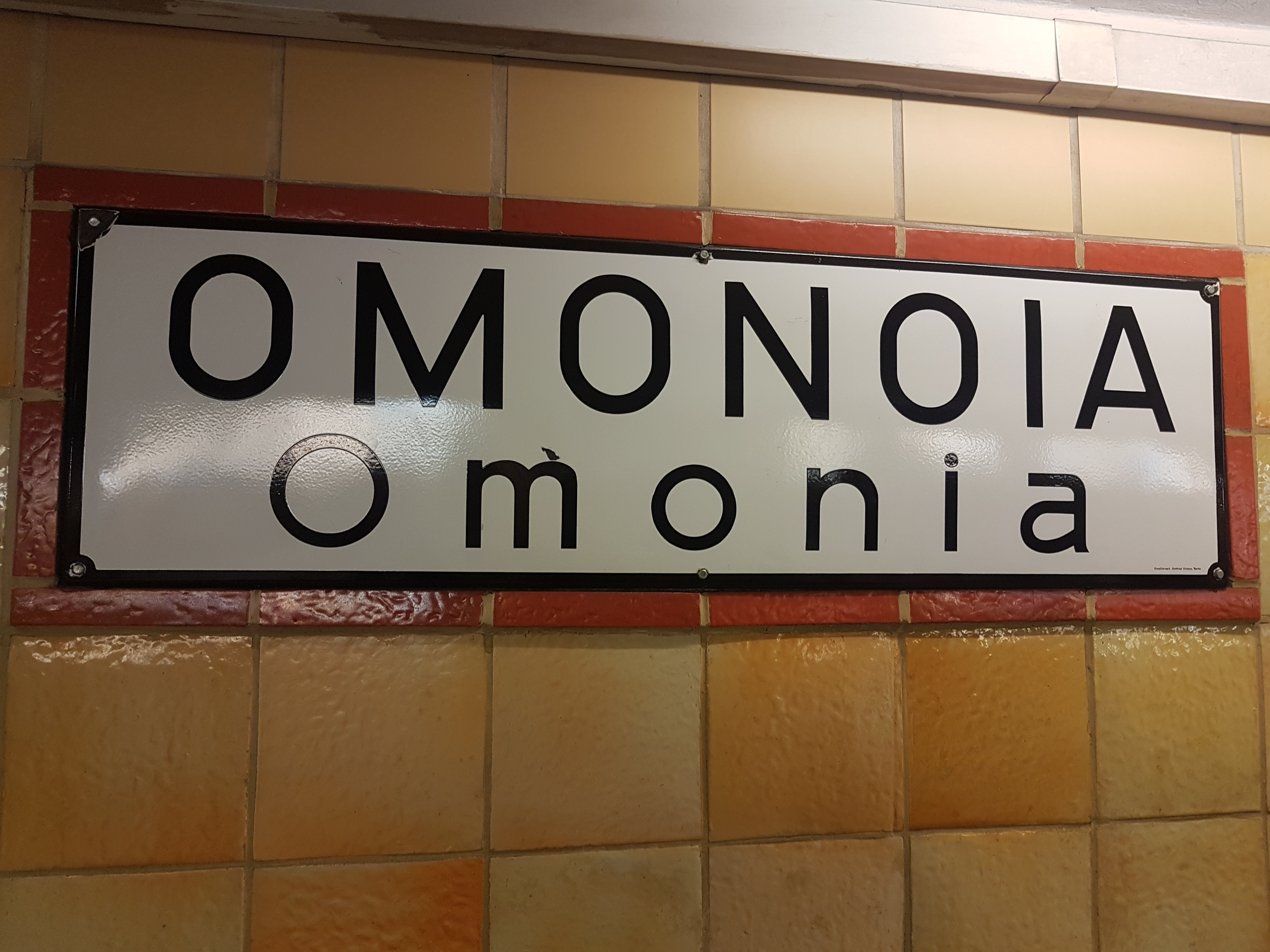
Omonia metro station

G
Street level
- Entry/Exit
- Omonia Square
B1
Concourse
- Customer service
- Tickets
B2
Side platform (Spanish solution), exit only
Southbound
← towards Piraeus (Monastiraki)
Island platform (Spanish solution), entry only
Northbound
towards Kifissia (Victoria) →
Side platform (Spanish solution), exit only
B3
Landing
Transfer between platforms
B4
Side platform
Westbound
← towards Anthoupoli (Metaxourgeio)
Eastbound
towards Elliniko (Panepistimio) →
Side platform
