= Omonoia Square =

Square in Athens, Greece

- Πλατεία Ομονοίας
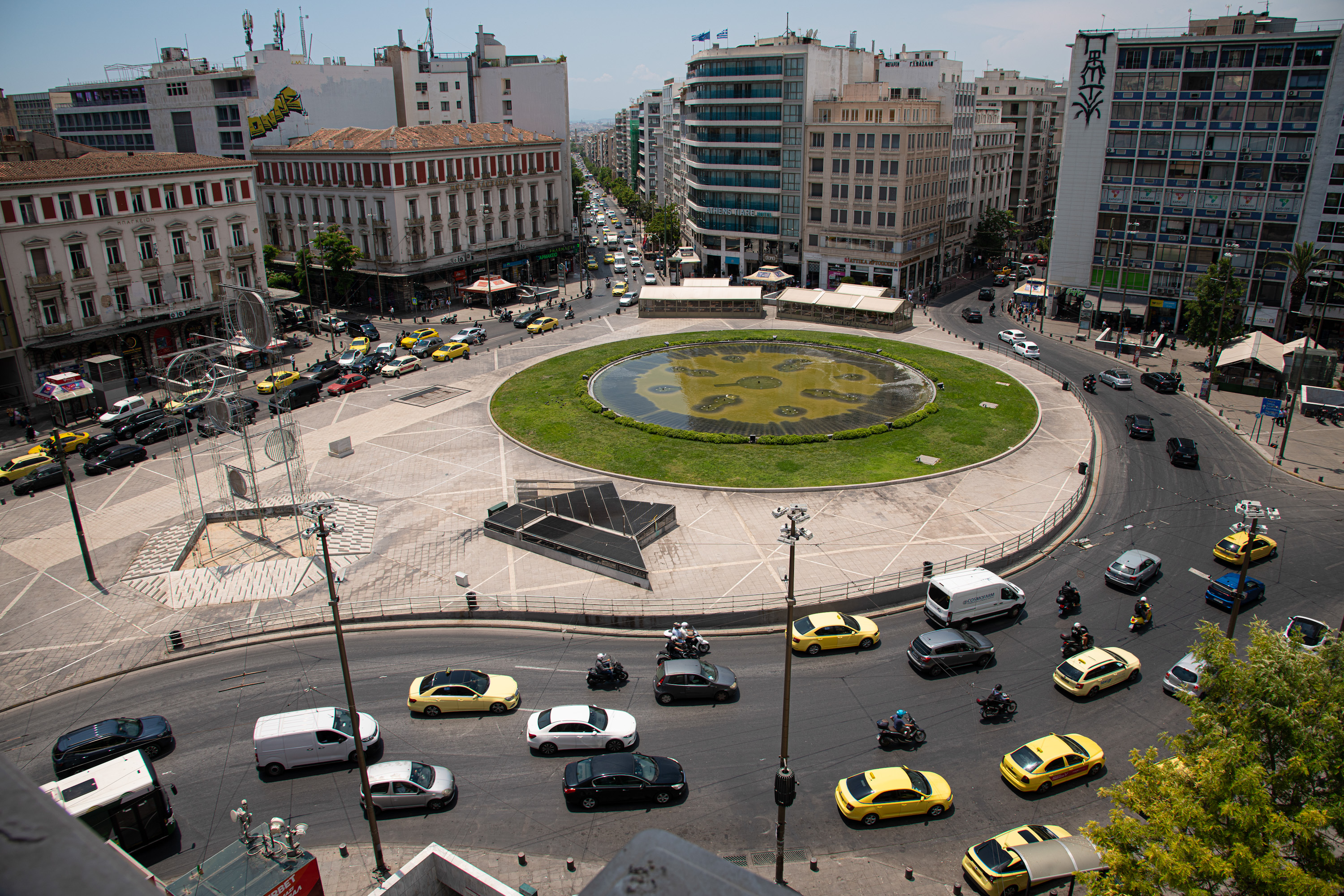
- Omonoia Square in 2026

- Location within Athens
- Former names: Palace Square; Othonos Square

General information
- Type: Open square
- Architectural style: Neoclassicism
- Location: Athens, Greece
- Coordinates: 37°59′03″N 23°43′40″E

Design and construction
- Architects: Stamatios Kleanthis, Eduard Schaubert, Leo von Klenze

Omonoia Square (Greek: Πλατεία Ομονοίας, Plateía Omonoías, pronounced [plaˈtia omoˈnias], "Concord Square", often simply referred to as Omónoia [oˈmonia]) is a central square in Athens. Forming the centre of Omonoia. It marks the northern corner of the downtown area defined by the city plans of the 19th century, and is one of the city's principal traffic hubs. It is served by Omonoia metro station.

Omonoia Square is one of the oldest squares in the city of Athens and an important shopping centre. It is located at the center of the city at the intersection of six main streets: Panepistimiou, Stadiou, Athinas, Peiraios, Agiou Konstantinou Street and 3rd Septemvriou Street.

== Name ==
Omonia Square was constructed in 1846, with its original name being "Plateia Anaktoron" (Palace Square). The area in which the square was going to be built was intended to be used for the construction of the palace (anaktora) by architects Stamatios Kleanthis and Eduard Schaubert. Later, the square was renamed to "Othonos Square" in honor of King Otto, the first king of Greece. After Otto was dethroned, the square was renamed to "Omonoia Square" in 1862, as it was here that the leaders of the opposing political factions gave the oath of peace (omonia) to stop hostilities.

== History of design changes ==
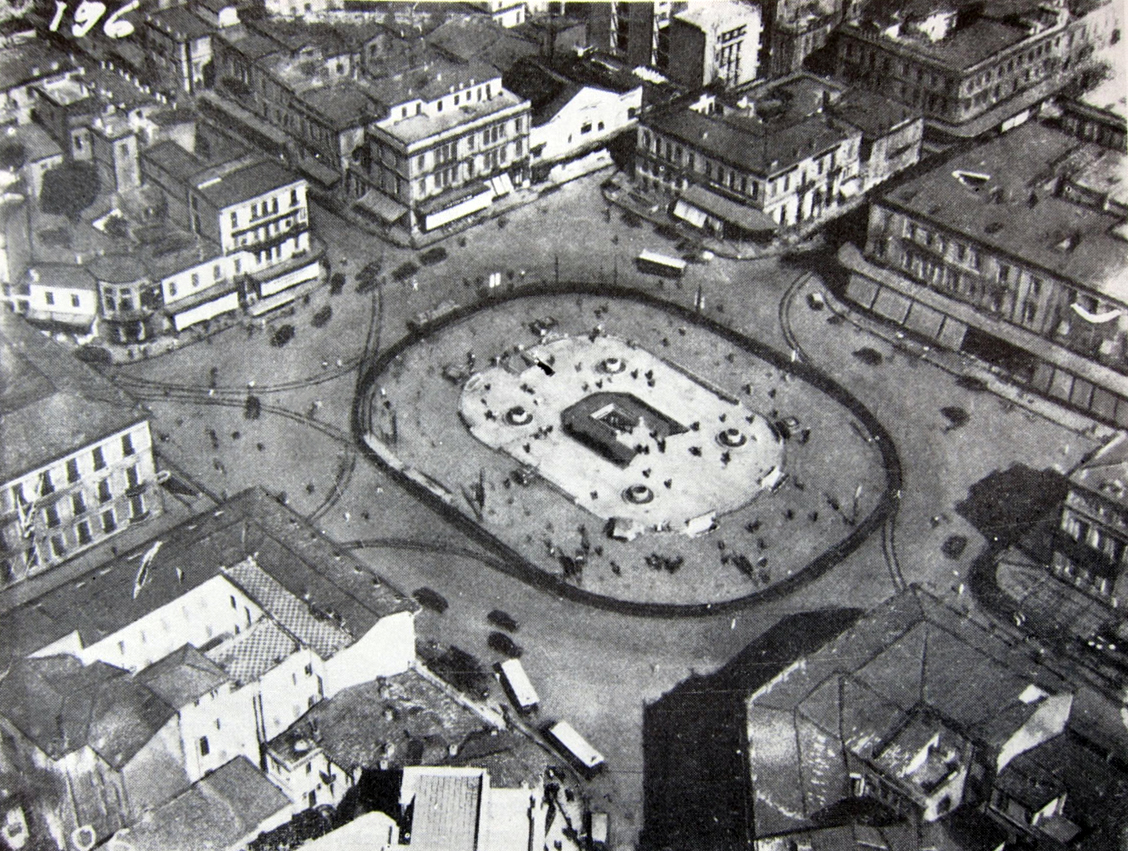
The square as seen from above during the 1930s.

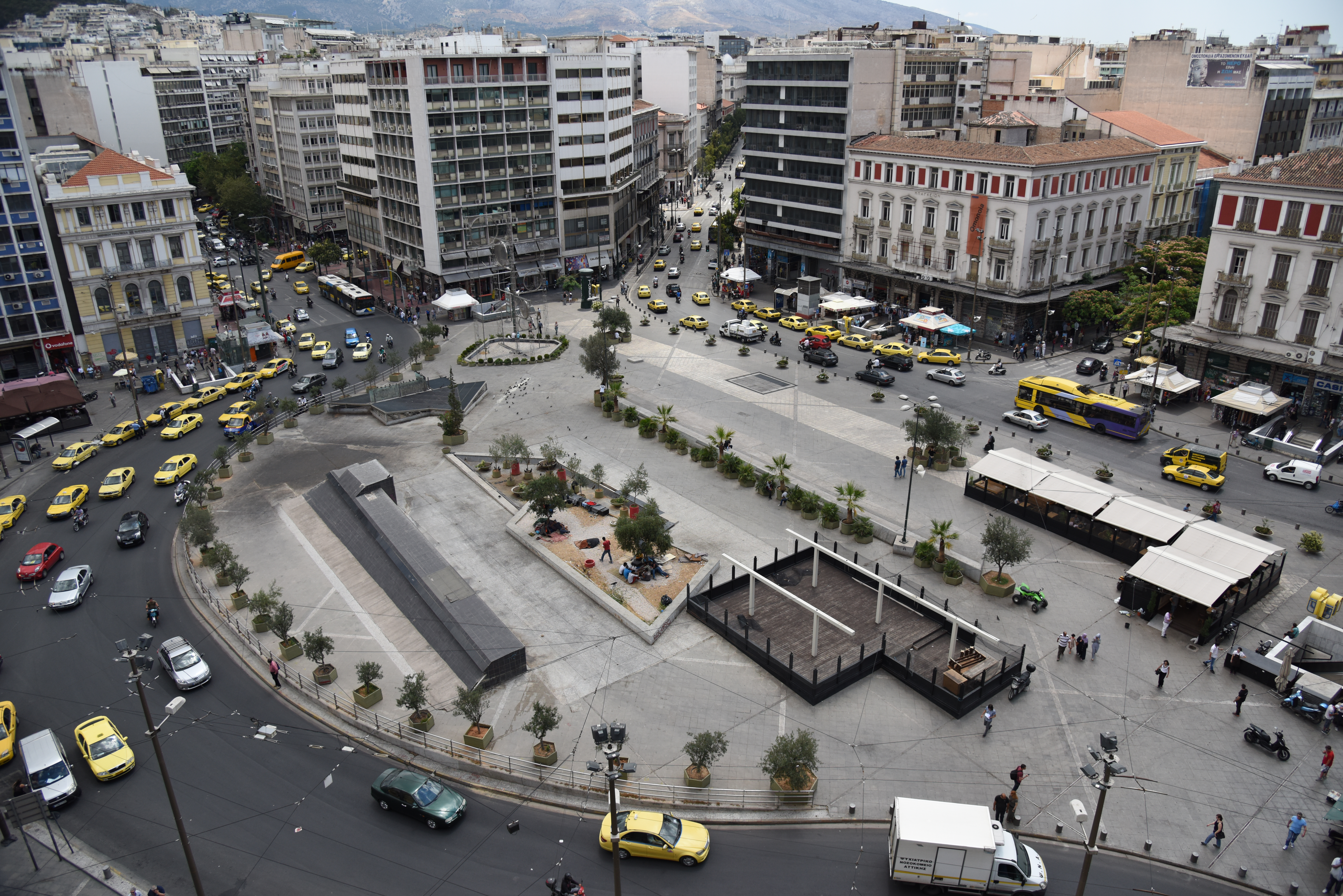
The square in June 2016 with the design initially introduced in 2004.

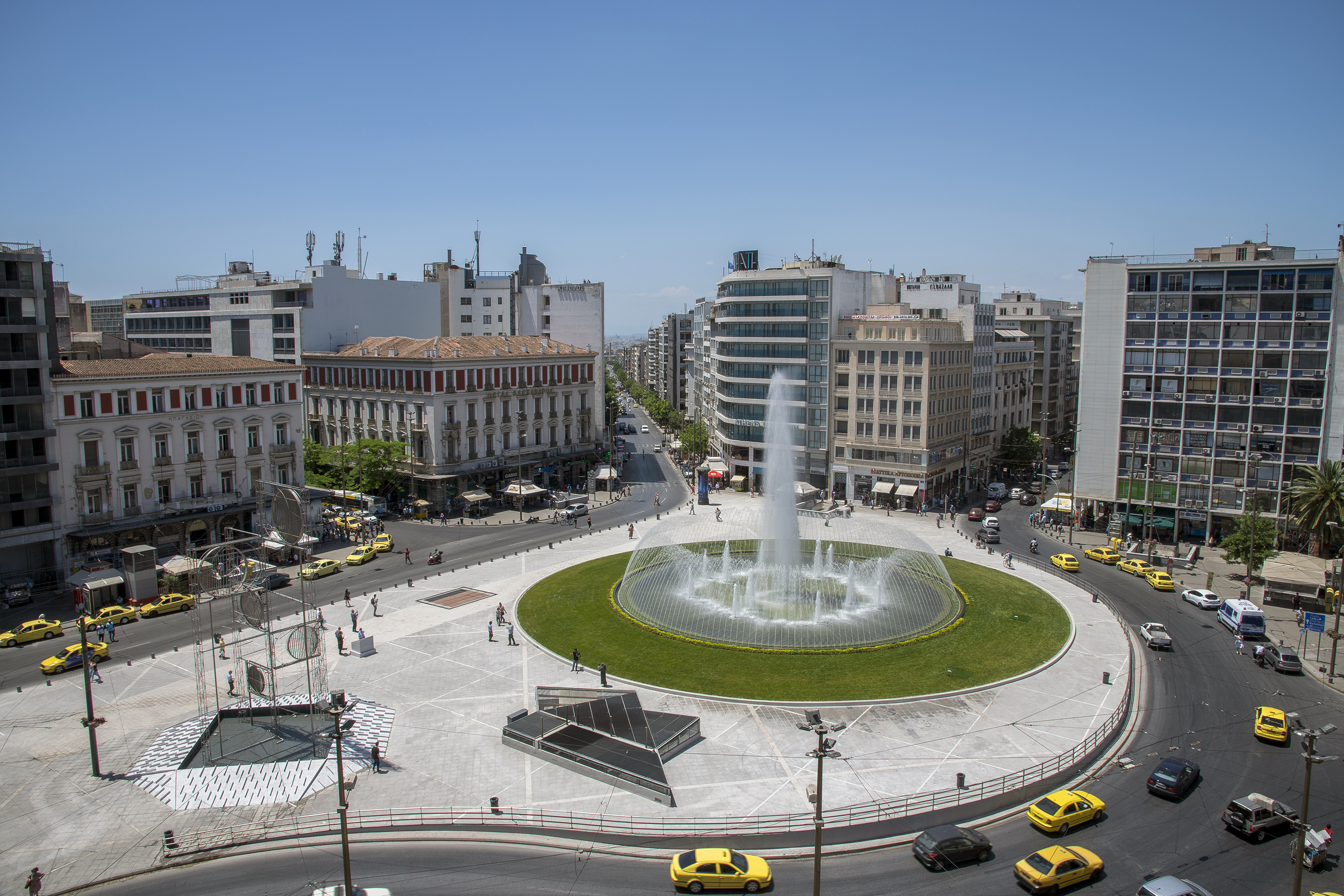
The square redesigned in May 2020.

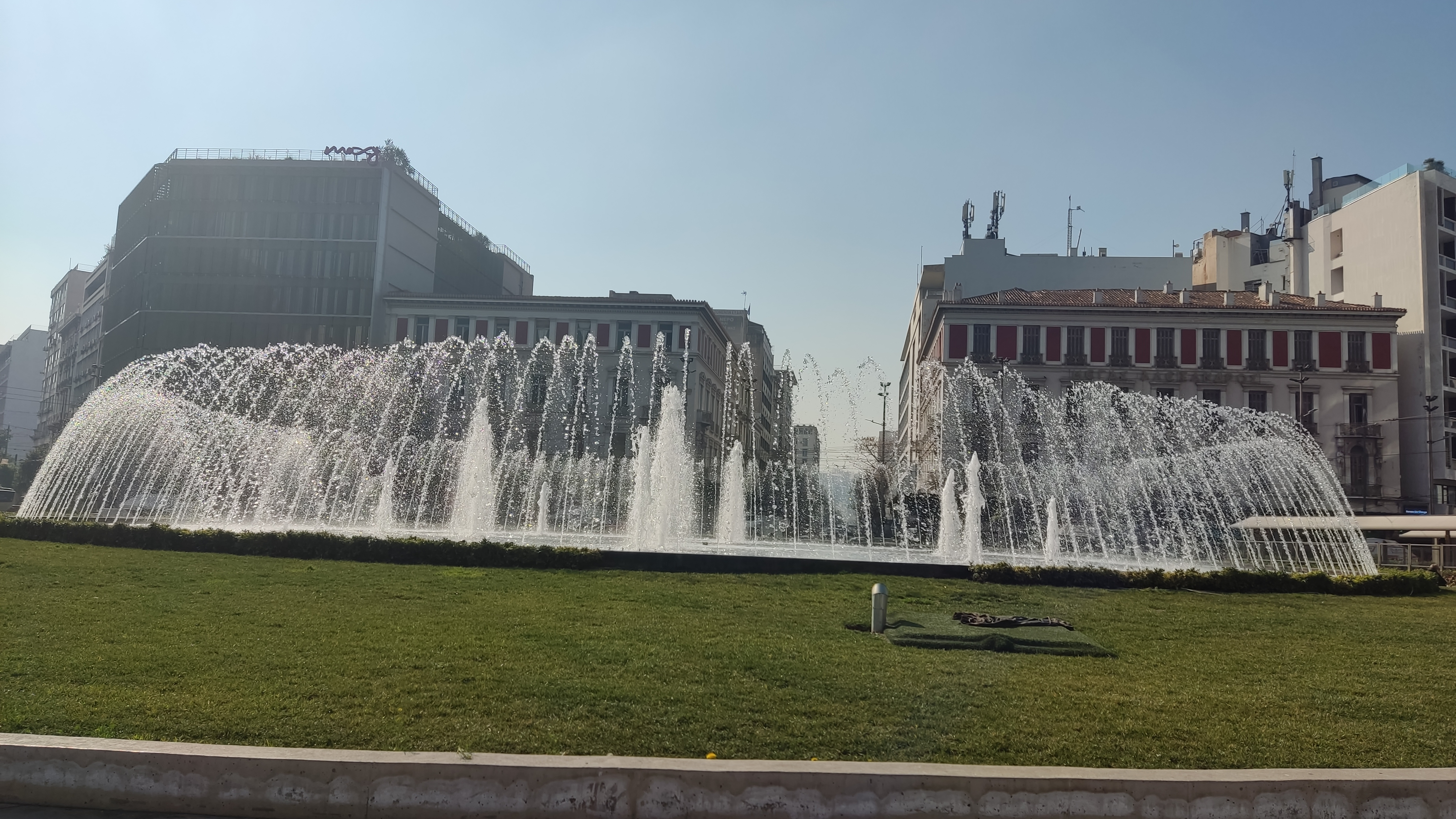
View of the square with emphasis on the fountain.

The fountain of Omonoia square as seen in the photo taken after the 2020 restoration. At the end of the 19th century the square underwent several formative changes. Trees were placed throughout the square, a polygonal platform was placed at the center of the square and lighting systems were installed. Omonoia Square was a center where people met and social life thrived, as it was also the railway's starting point, surrounded by numerous hotels.

From 1925 to 1930, the underground railway between Piraeus and Athens was built requiring further redesign of the square. Omonoia Square became circular and marble bars were put at the entrances of the underground railway station. The square started to resemble European prototypes and acquired an important commercial role. Due to the existence of the underground railway it was also necessary to create an underground ventilation system, and in 1931 the then Mayor of Athens, Spiros Merkouris, suggested placing eight sculptures representing the mythological Muses to cover the openings of the ventilation vents. Although the problem was resolved, the result did not satisfy Athenians’ aesthetic expectations, and the statues were removed.

The 50s were a period of modernization for Athens and consequently for many public spaces. In 1954, in the underground area of Omonoia Square banks, shops and a post office were built.

In 1958 the Ministry of Transportation and Public Works held a competition for the development of Omonoia Square. Sculptor George Zongolopoulos and architect Kostas Bitsios were awarded the project. Their proposal included a circular water system in the middle of which would be placed Zongolopoulos’ sculpture "Poseidon". The square was redesigned, although ultimately without the placement of the sculpture. Eventually, the sculpture was installed permanently in 2014 outside the Milken School of Public Health at The George Washington University, Washington D.C. in the United States. The fountain of Omonia became a famous city landmark and the square itself was depicted many times in Greek movies of the period.

In November 1992, the fountain and the sculpture "Runner" were destroyed in order to excavate the area for the construction of the new red line of the Athens Metro and the new station. In May 1994 a new "Runner" was constructed and transferred into its current location, across from the Hilton Hotel of Athens.

From mid-2019 to February 2020, the square underwent yet another major reconstruction, which became necessary after previous aesthetic and urban changes had eventually led to the degradation of this central and historical area of Athens. With public and private funding, the municipality of Athens restored the historical fountain from 1958 and replaced all pave way materials with thermoneutral materials that reduce the thermal footprint of the entire square. The redesigned square was opened to the public on May 14, 2020.

Beneath the square lies the Omonia metro station, a major transport hub with passenger traffic equal to that of the Syntagma metro station.

== Celebrations ==
Sporting celebrations have been held at the square, including following Greece's victory in the EuroBasket 2005 finals and in winning the championship. Other sporting successes, such as the Euro 2004 tournament, when people climbed the 'Five-ring' sculpture to celebrate with national flags, have also been celebrated.

== Architecture ==
After its transformation in 2003, the square lost some of its former value and prestige, but nevertheless continues to represent a multicultural place and point of communication as a transportation hub for thousands throughout the day.

Two of its most recognizable buildings are the old neoclassical hotels of the area; the "Bagkeion" and "Megas Alexandros", located side by side on either side of Athinas street.

The Pentakiklon ('Five-ring' sculpture) has its own story; placed in the square in 2001, it never functioned fully as initially conceived by the architect, as it was meant to be a motion sculpture when water ran in it. During the Christmas of 2008, when water ran in the sculpture for the first time, it transformed the circles into motion. After that, further time passed with the piece falling back into neglect, until it was refurbished once more and permanently restored to its initial concept of a motion sculpture, during the 2020 restoration of the whole square. At the same time the famous round fountain, which acted as a landmark for decades, was redesigned and re-installed.

== Gallery ==
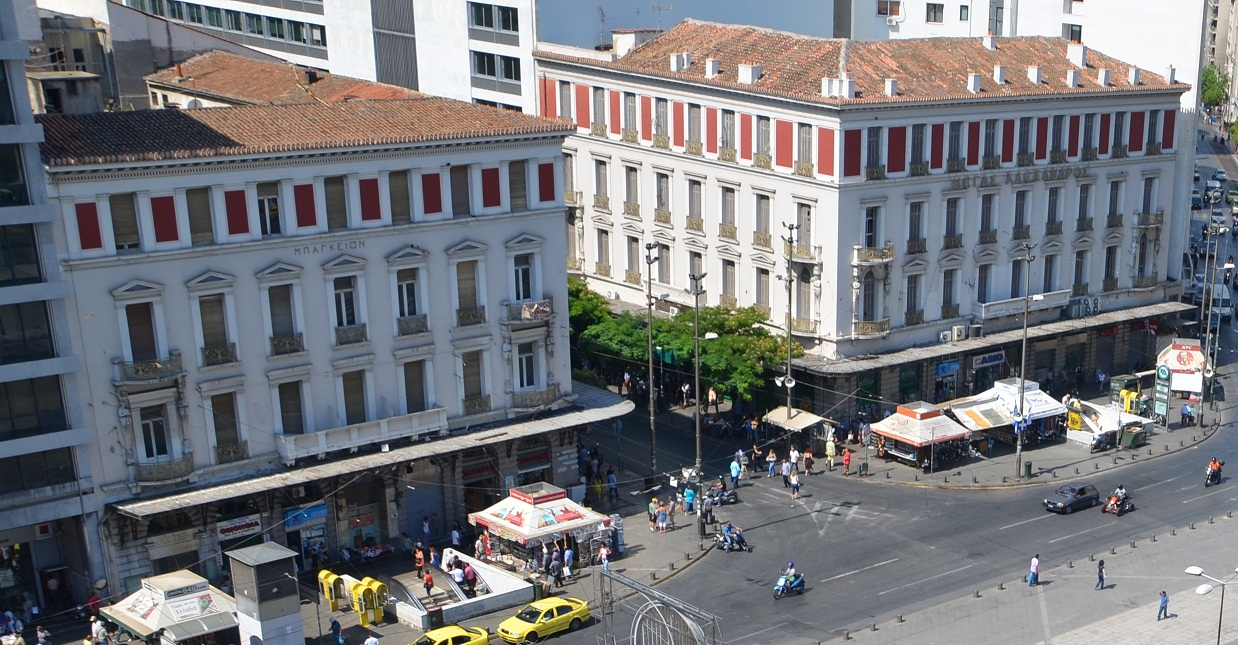
Two of the most recognizable buildings of the square: Bagkeion mansion (left) and Megas Alexandros Hotel (arch. Ernst Ziller)

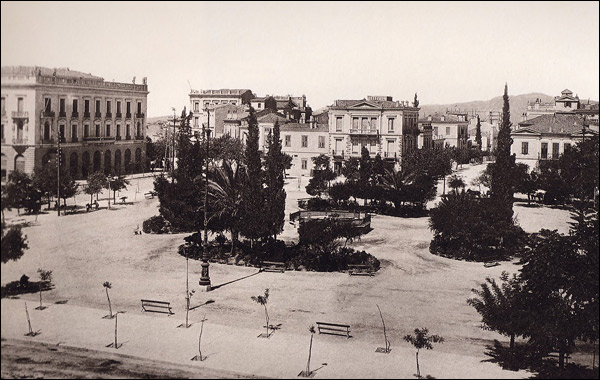
Omonoia Square, 1890

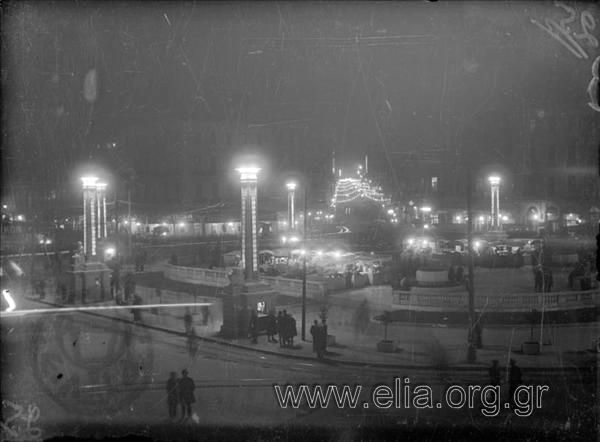
Electric lights in the square, 1934

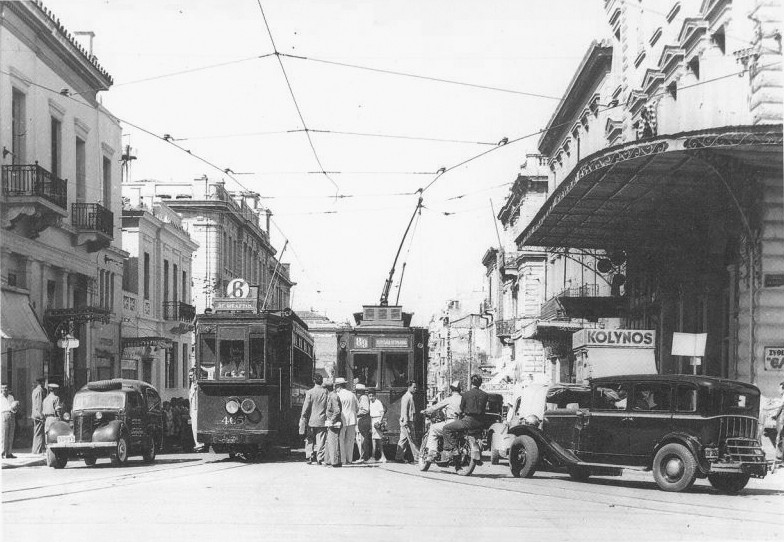
Omonoia during the 1950s

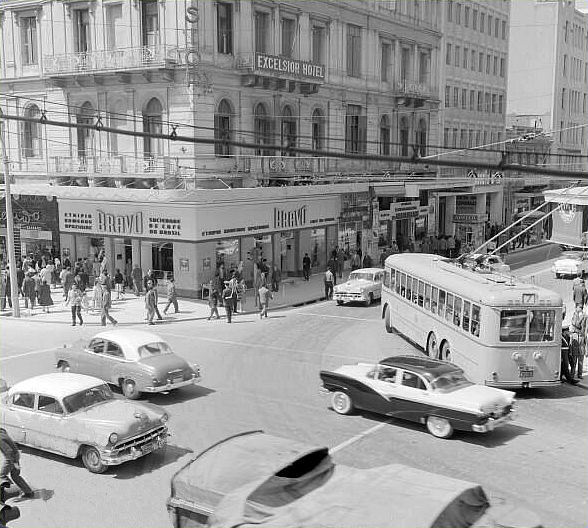
Omonoia during the 1960s

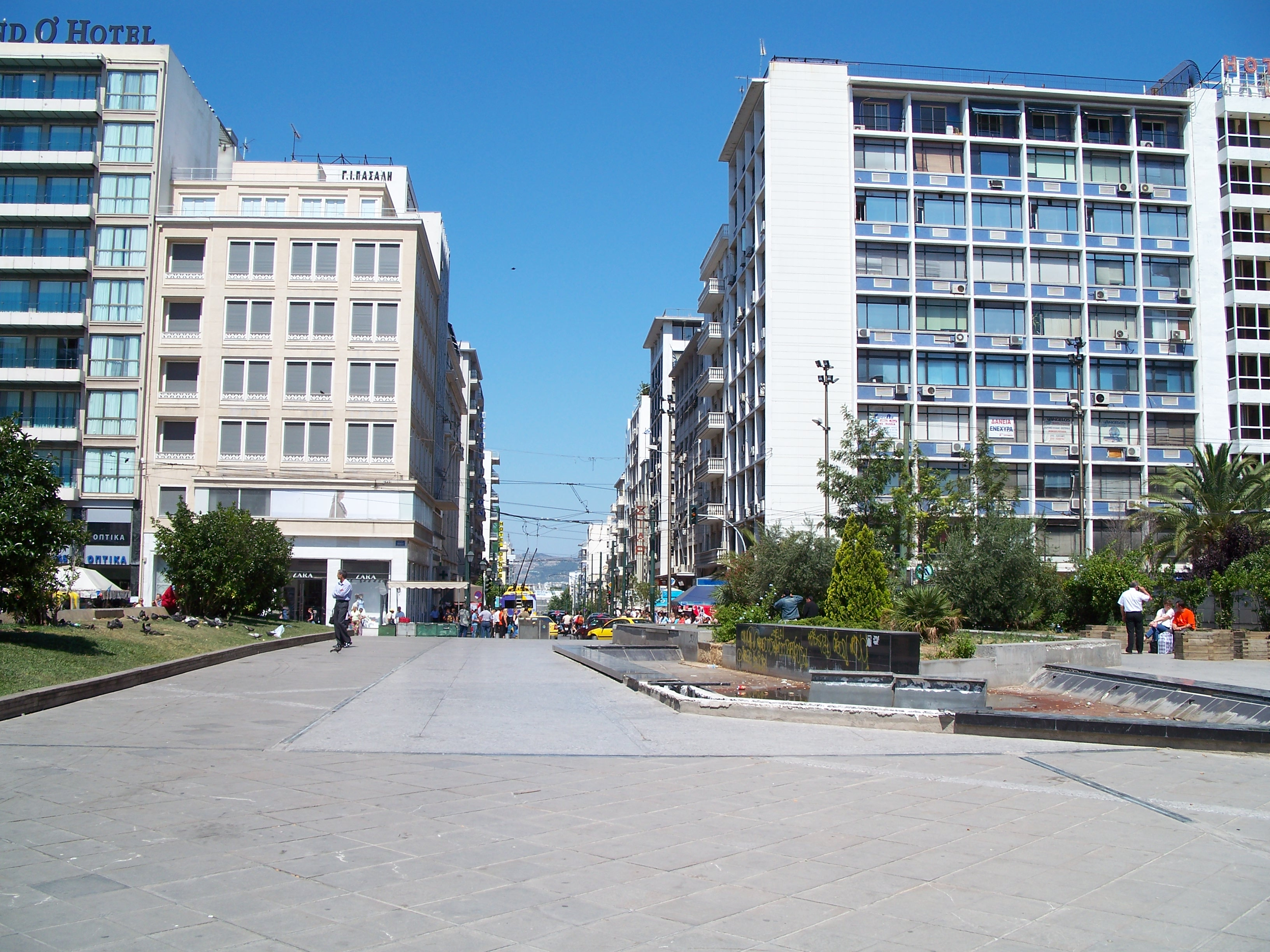
View of the square

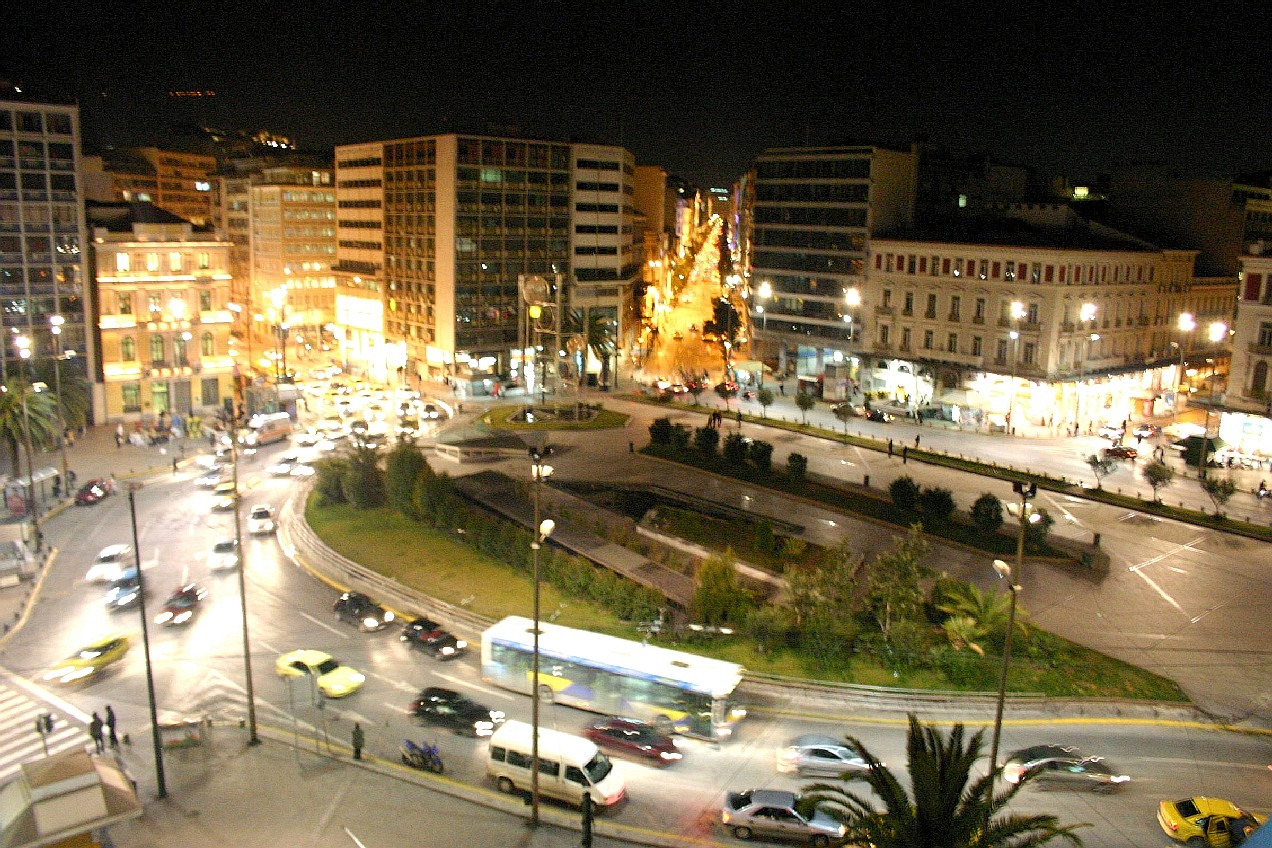
Night view, 2006

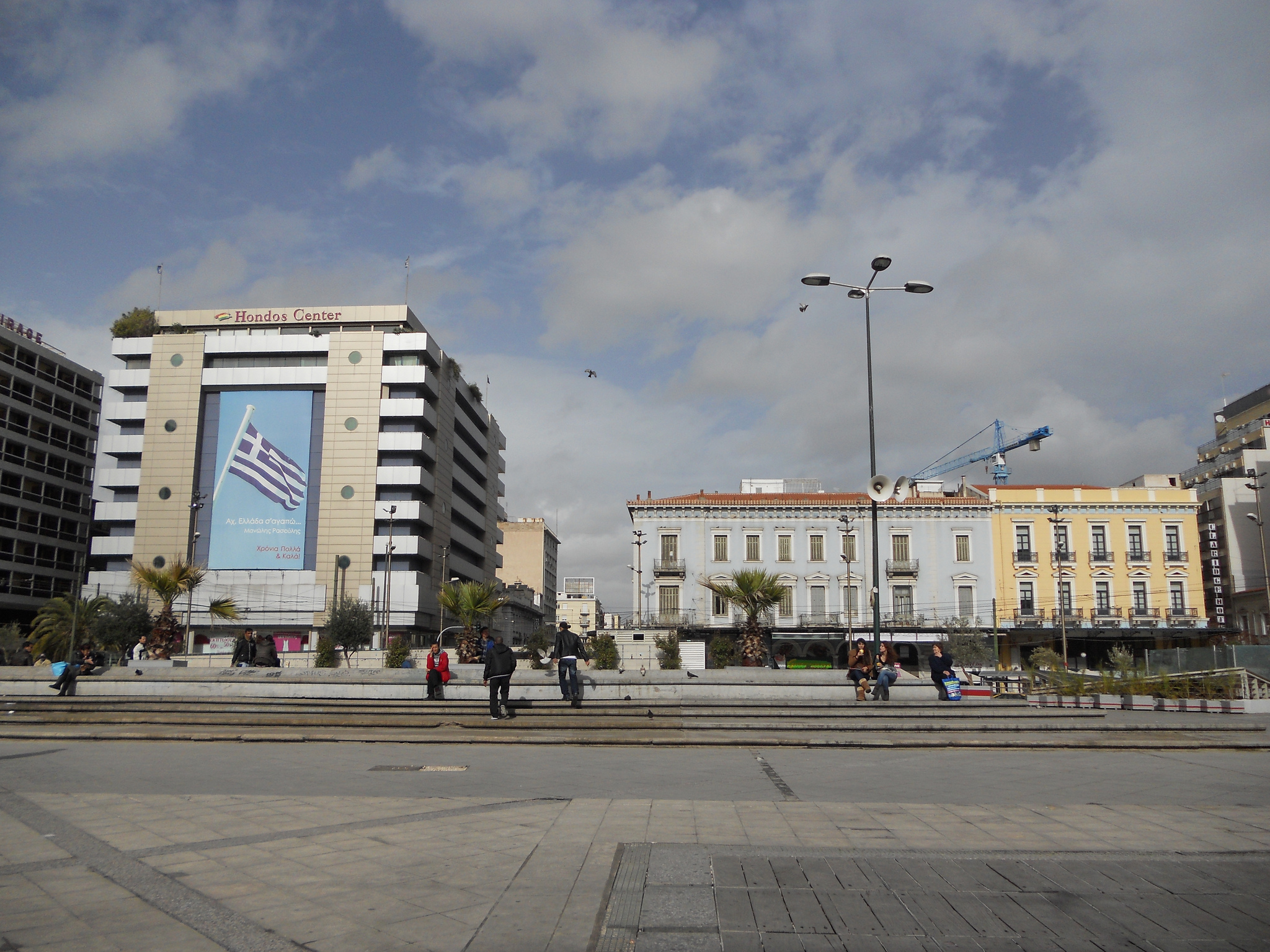
Omonoia Square, 2013

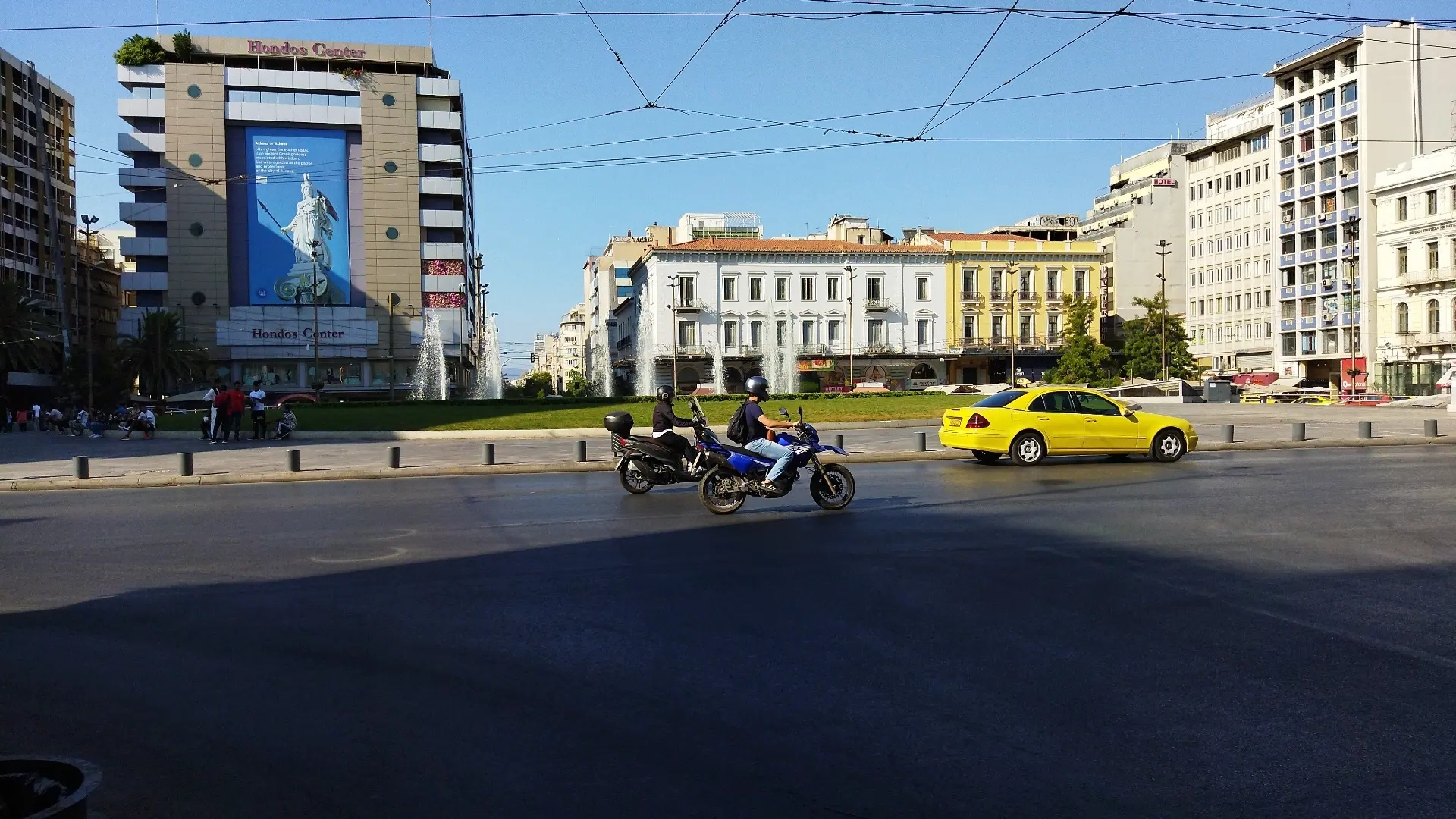
Omonoia, 2021
