= Monastiraki metro station =

Athens Metro station

Μοναστηράκι Monastiraki
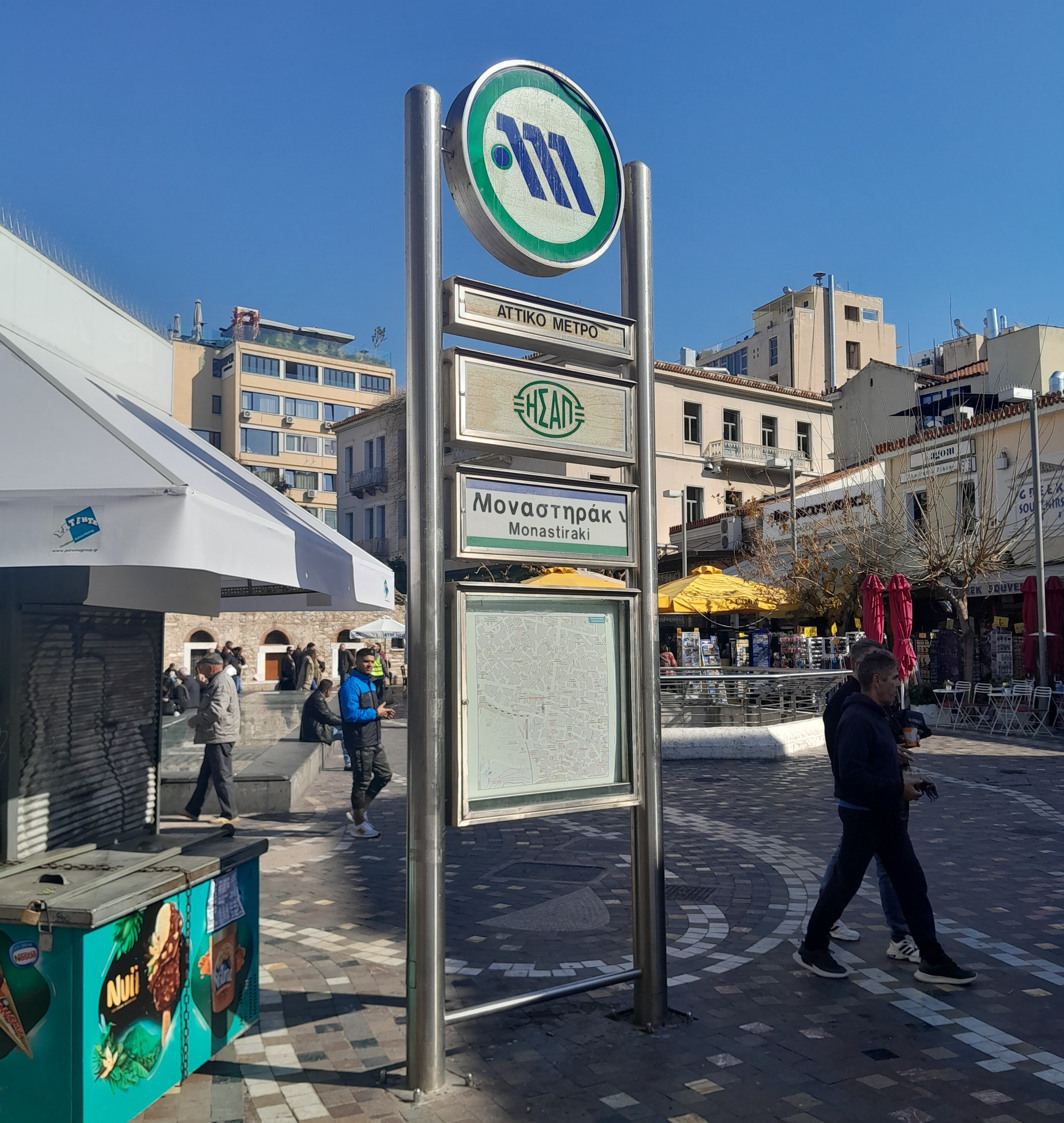

General information
- Other names: Monastirion
- Location: 105 55 Athens; Greece
- Coordinates: 37.975985°N 23.725390°E
- Manager: STASY
- Line: Athens Metro Line 1 Athens Metro Line 3
- Platforms: 4
- Tracks: 4

Construction
- Structure type: Open sub-surface (Line 1); Underground (Line 3)
- Platform levels: 2
- Accessible: Yes (portable boarding ramp recommended for Line 1)

Key dates
- 17 May 1895: Line 1 station opened
- 1904: Line 1 station electrified
- 22 April 2003: Line 3 station opened
- 10 August 2004: Line 1 station rebuilt

Services
Preceding station	Athens Metro	Following station
Thiseio towards Piraeus	Line 1	Omonia towards Kifissia
Kerameikos towards Dimotiko Theatro	Line 3	Syntagma towards Athens Airport
Location

Monastiraki (Greek: Μοναστηράκι, lit. 'Little Monastery') is an interchange station on the Athens Metro, between Lines 1 and 3. The original surface station on Line 1 opened on 17 May 1895. It became an interchange point of the network when the underground station of Line 3 opened on 22 April 2003. It is located in the historic center of Athens, near the neighborhood of Plaka. The station is right beneath the Acropolis and next to the site of the Ancient Agora of Athens.

== History ==
Monastiraki opened as Monastirion (Greek: Μοναστήριον, lit. 'Monastery' in Katharevousa) on 17 May 1895 and Line 3 station followed over a century later, on 22 April 2003. The line 1 station was renovated ahead of the 2004 Summer Olympics. Along with Perissos it was the last Line 1 station to be renovated and opened on 10 August 2004, just three days before the games began. Signage for the former name remains in place on the Line 1 platforms, although new signage was added after the 2004 renovation.

== Line 1 station ==
The platforms are located on a curve on a north-west axis. This curve is the main factor contributing in the characteristic gap that is formed between the train and the platform. The station is sub-surface, half underground and half in an open-cut. The station is located between two tunnels, a small one on the west and the large Attiki-Monastiraki tunnel in the north. About 1/3 of the platform walls' surface is decorated with gray square tiles. The rest of the walls are painted white and are decorated with characteristic circular lamps. The west end of each platform has an emergency exit that leads to Adrianou street. The open-cut part of the platforms is covered by two roofs, one covering each platform. Each roof is supported on multiple green Ionic iron columns located on both platform's edges. The underground part, located underneath the station's building, is covered by a ceiling supported by concrete arches, iron beams and green Doric iron columns. The columns here are located between the train tracks instead of the platform's edge. The ceiling is similar to that found on several sub-surface stations of the Paris Métro. Three pathways lead to the Line 3 platforms: one on the southbound platform and another two on the northbound. An additional pathway leads from the northbound platform to a specially-built space were antiquities are exhibited. Two staircases, one on each platform, lead to a small balcony on the back of the station's building from where both the platforms are visible. Line 1's concourse level, essentially the old station's building, is located on Monasriraki square and has multiple arched exits. It is built in Neoclassical style and has a tiled roof. The ceiling is covered with artwork by Leda Papaconstantinou. A staircase that leads to Line 3 also exists on the concourse level. The concourse level contains several ticket-vending machines, an ATM and a coffee shop.

Line 1 platforms

Line 1 platforms as seen from above

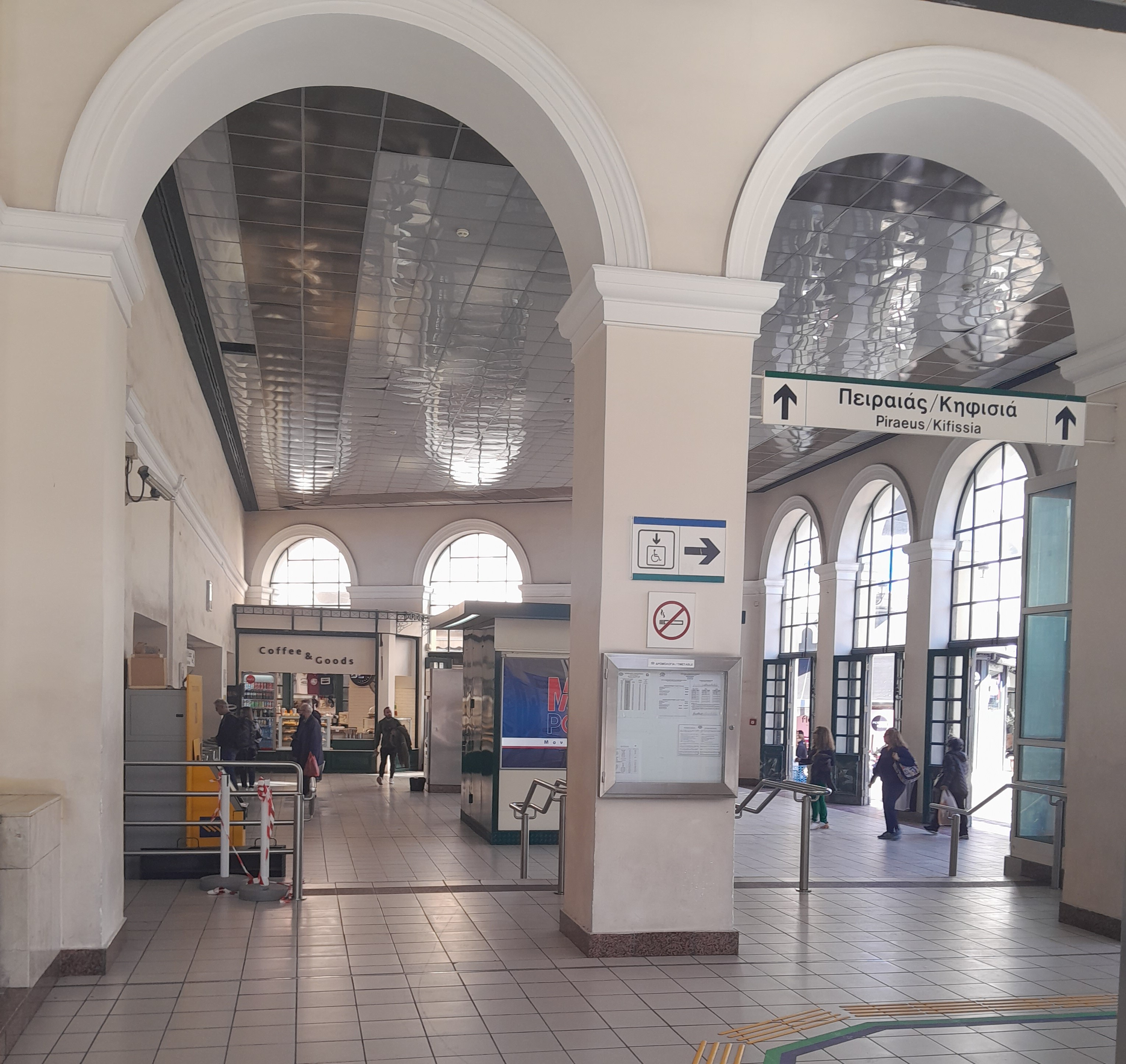
Line 1 concourse level

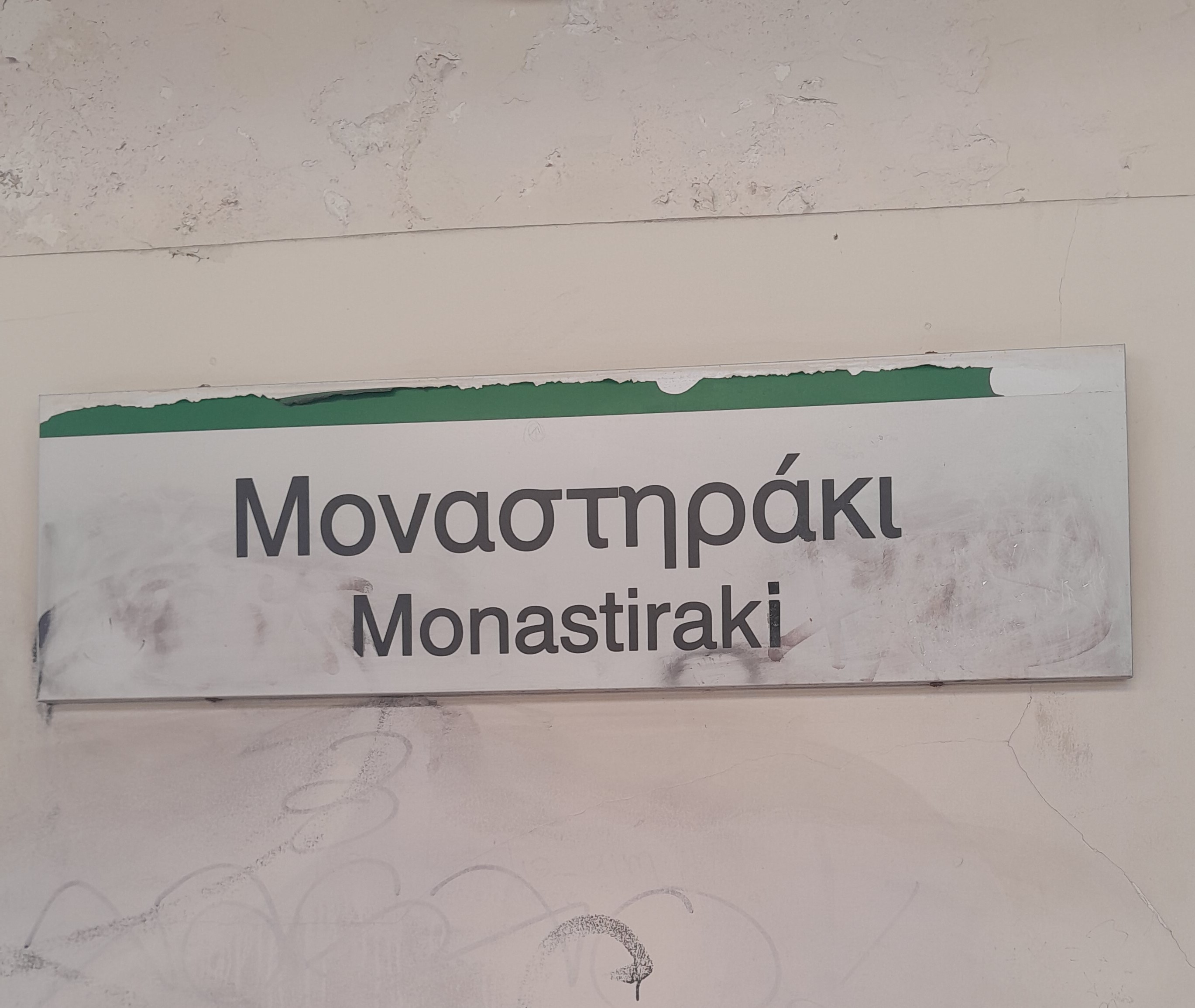
Line 1 platform sign

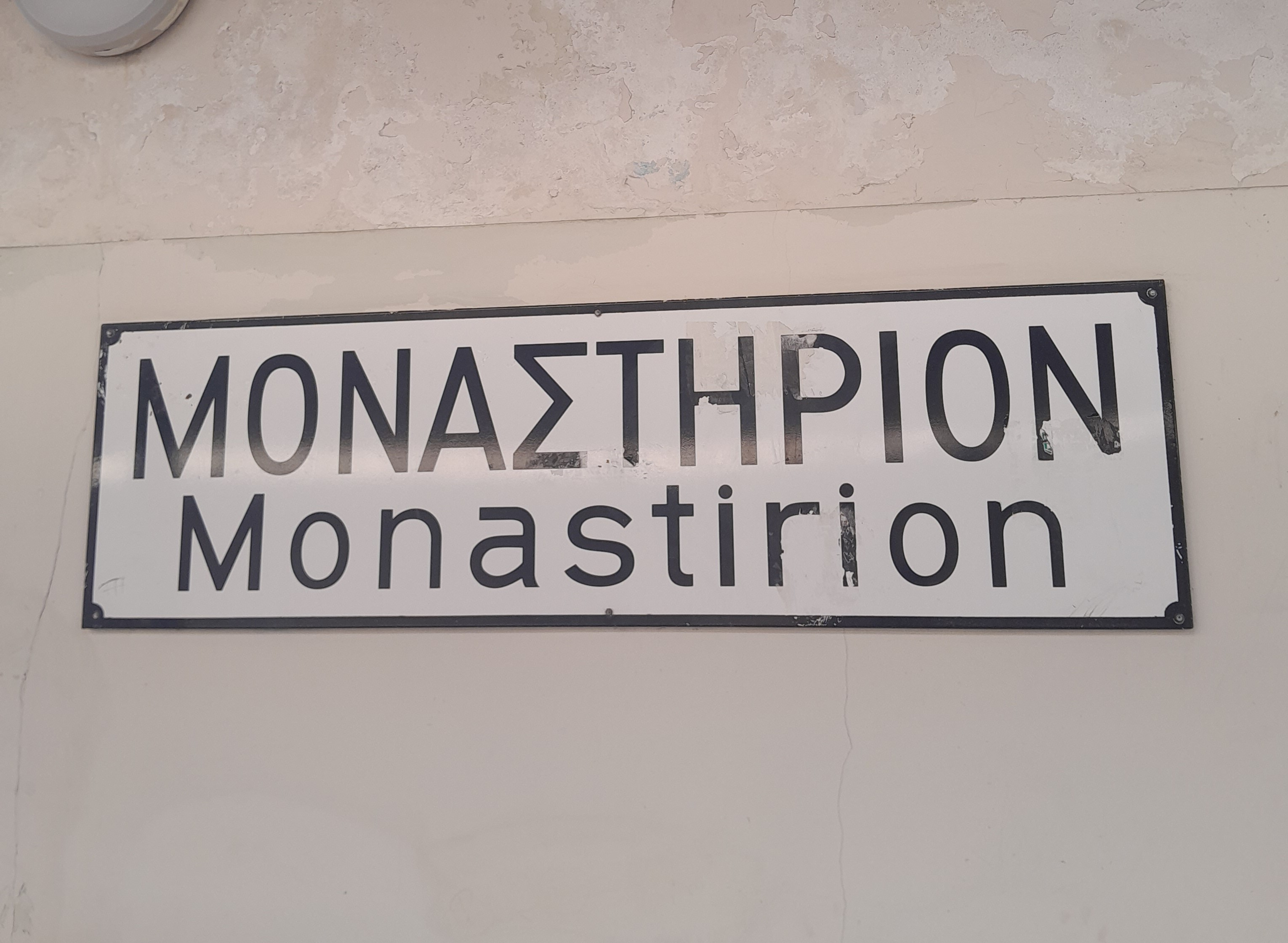
Line 1 old platform sign

== Line 3 station ==
The station has two entrances on ground level. One is located on Monastiraki square, inside the old station building, and the other is located under a building between Athinas and Themidos Street. Both entrances lead to the concourse level, which is somewhat rectangular with four pathways, one on each side, and an elevator leading to the platforms in the middle. Of the four pathways, two lead to the platforms, one leads to Athinas street exit, while the fourth leads to Line 1's platforms and the Monastiraki square exit. The station has two island platforms, which are noteworthy for being the longest in the whole metro network. The floor, as in every Line 2 and Line 3 station, has granite tiles, the walls are made of concrete, while the ceiling is colored dark gray.

Line 3 platforms

Line 3 concourse level

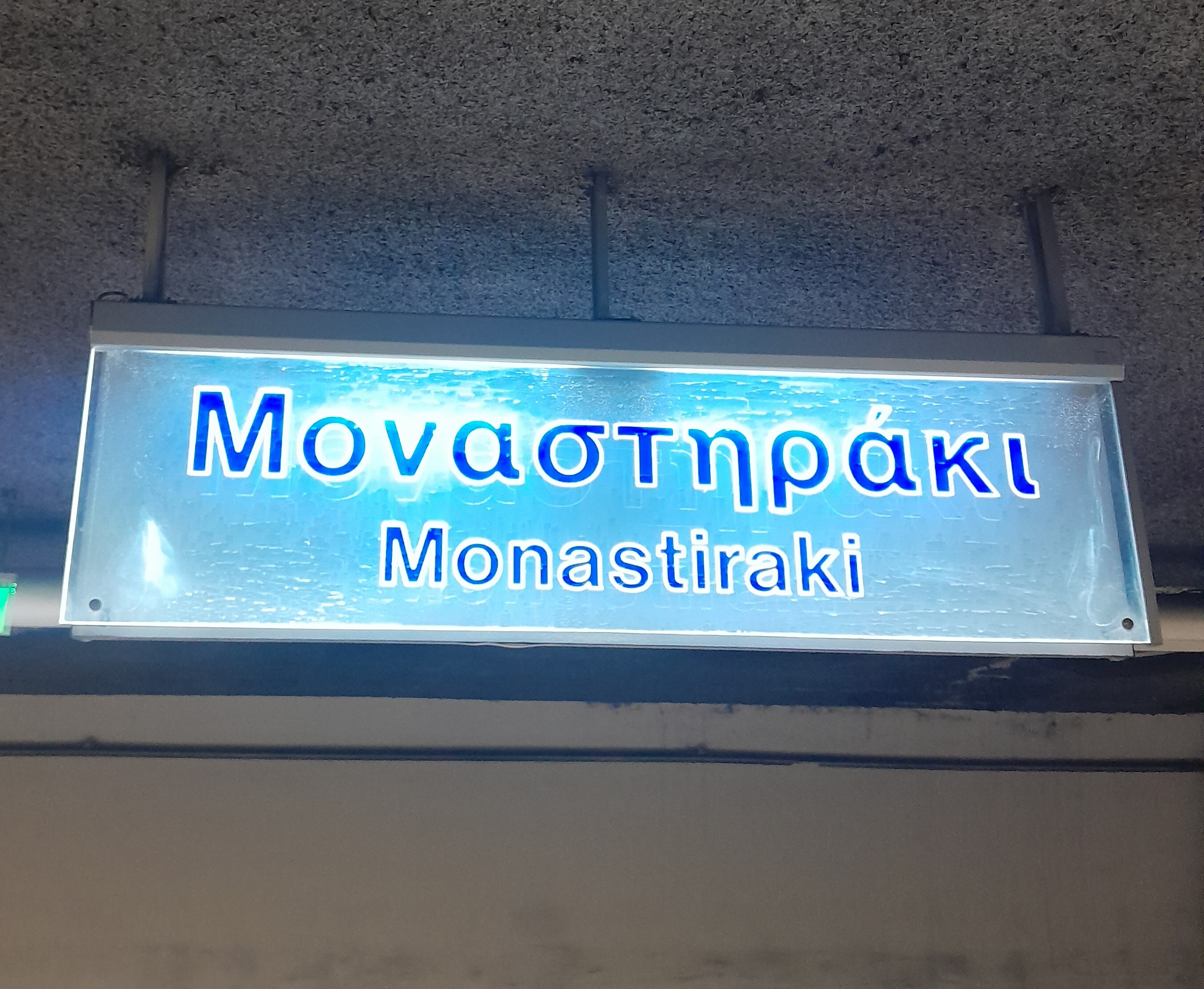
Line 3 platform sign

== Exits ==
Exit	Location	Image	Accessibility	Coordinates
	Monastiraki Sq.			37°58′34″N 23°43′32″E
	Athinas Str.			37°58′37″N 23°43′34″E
	Themidos Str.			37°58′37″N 23°43′33″E

== Artwork & Antiquities ==
As expected due to the station's location, multiple parts of ancient Athens were found during line 3 station's construction. These included, among others, the covered riverbed of Eridanos which is visible behind the northbound line 1 platform. The ceiling of line 1's concourse level is covered by "The World in my Hands" by Leda Papaconstantinou. The artwork consists of 324 separate plexiglass pieces that together cover an area of 134 sq. m.

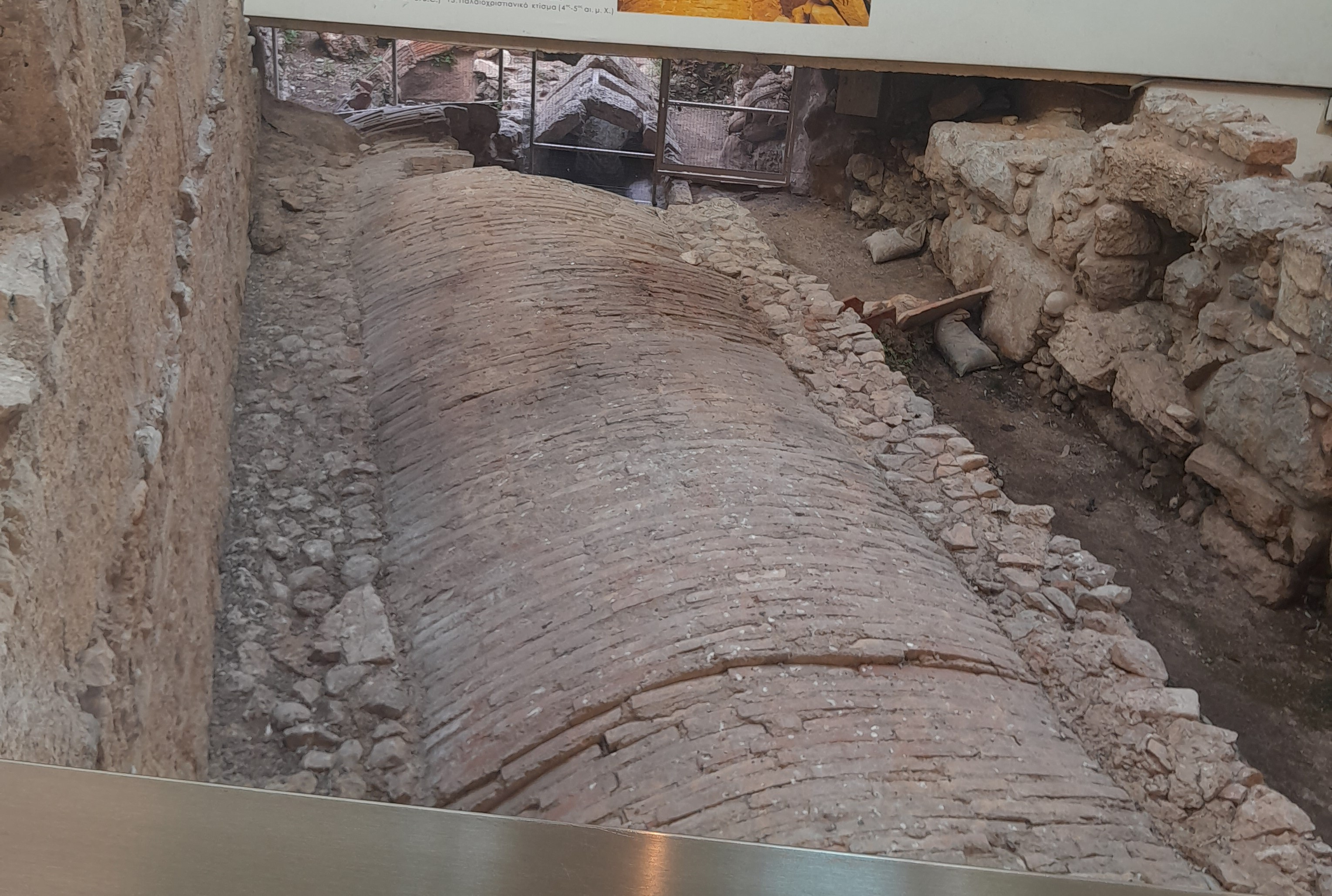
The covered riverbed of Eridanos

The World in my Hands by Leda Papaconstantinou

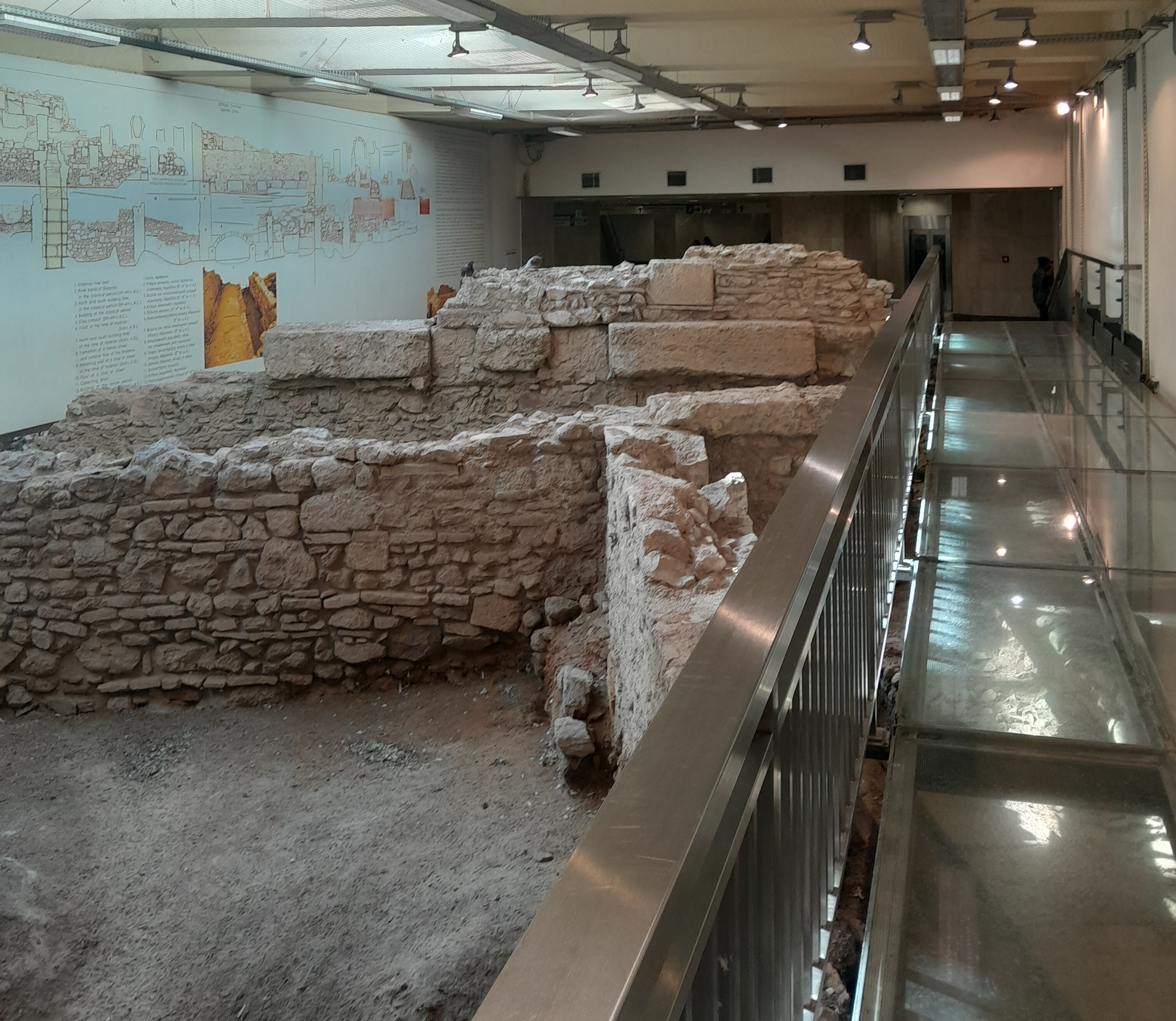
Ancient Athenian buildings discovered during Line 3 station's excavation

== Nearby points of interest ==
- Monastiraki
- Hadrian's Library
- Roman Agora
- Stoa of Attalos
- Ancient Agora
- Tzistarakis Mosque
- Kapnikarea

== Station layout ==
G
Concourse
- Customer service
- Tickets
- Entry/Exit
B1
Side platform
Westbound
← towards Piraeus (Thiseio)
Northbound
towards Kifissia (Omonia) →
Side platform
Museum
Eridanos riverbed
B2
Concourse
- Customer service
- Tickets
B3
Landing
Escalator/stairway landing
B4
Westbound
← towards Dimotiko Theatro via Egaleo (Kerameikos)
Island platform
Eastbound
towards Athens Airport (Syntagma) →
