= Pantanassa =

Pantanassa (Greek: Παντάνασσα), meaning "Queen of All", is one of the traditional epithets of the Virgin Mary in Greek Orthodoxy. It can refer to:

== Churches ==
- Church of the Pantanassa, Athens, Greece
- Pantanassa Monastery Mystras, Greece
- Pantanassa, a monastery of the Greek Orthodox Archdiocese of Australia in Mangrove Creek, New South Wales, Australia

== Settlements ==
- Pantanassa, Aetolia-Acarnania
- Pantanassa, Arta
- Pantanassa, Laconia
- Pantanassa, Rethymno
