= Museum of Greek Folk Art =

Coordinates: 37°58′21.12″N 23°43′56.31″E

The Museum of Greek Folk Art
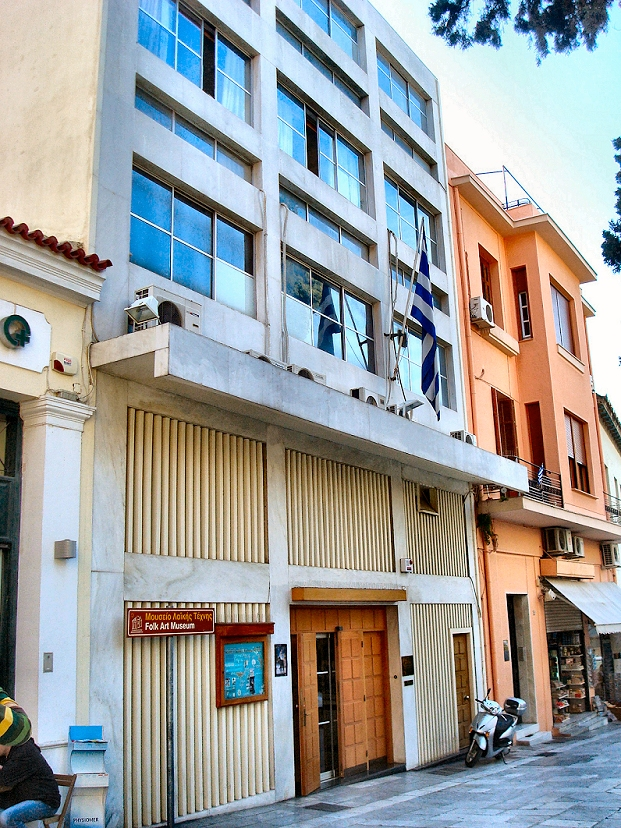
- Established: 1918 (present location 1973)
- Location: 17 Kydathinaion Str., Plaka, Athens, Greece
- Type: Folk art museum
- Public transit access: Athens Metro stations: Syntagma Station
- Website: www.mnep.gr/en/

The Museum of Greek Folk Art is a museum in Athens, Greece. The museum was founded in 1918 as the Museum of Greek Handicrafts in the Tzistarakis Mosque in Monastiraki, which later became the National Museum of Decorative Arts and in 1959 it obtained its current name. In 1973 the greater part of the collection and the main functions of the museum were moved to 17 Kydathinaion Str. in Plaka and the mosque was annexed to it. Other annexes are the old "Public Baths" at Kyrristou 8 and one at Thespidos 8, both also in Plaka.

== Tzistarakis Mosque ==
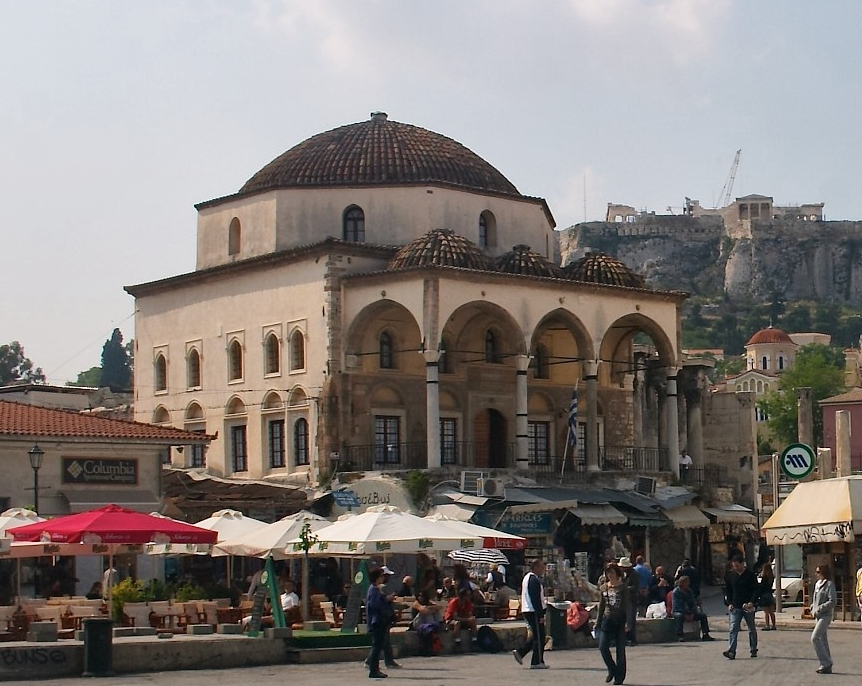
The Tzistarakis Mosque in Monastiraki Square

The Tzistarakis Mosque in Monastiraki square is one of the annexes of the Museum of Greek Folk Art, housing the "V. Kyriazopoulos Collection of Folk Pottery".

== Public Baths ==
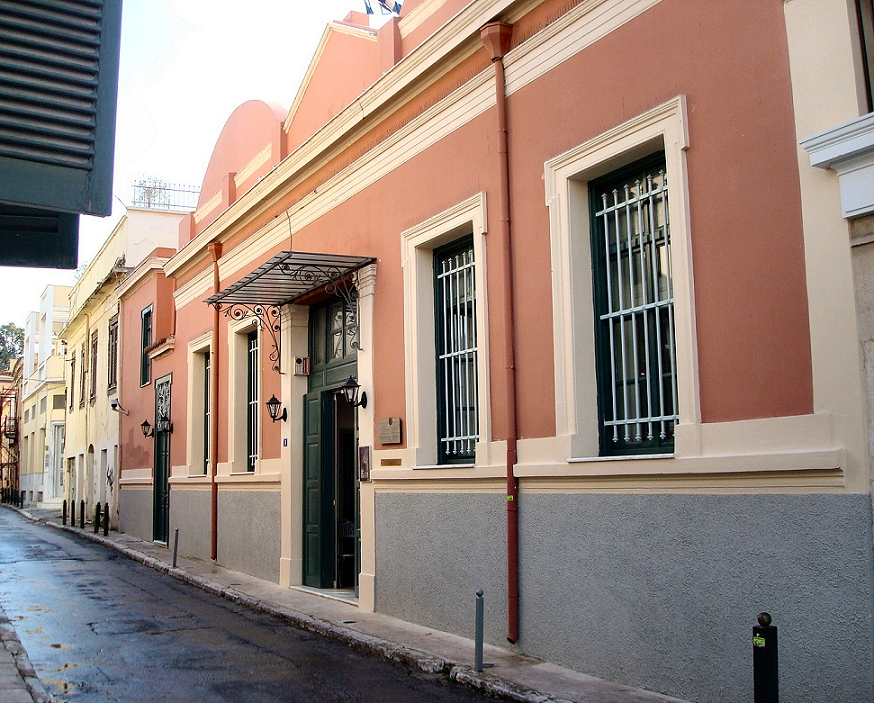
The Public Baths in Plaka, 8 Kyrristou Str.

The old Public Baths in 8 Kyrristou Str. is the only surviving and very well preserved Public Baths building in Athens and it is another annex of the Folk Art Museum.

== See also ==
- List of former mosques in Greece
