= Church of the Pantanassa, Athens =

10th-century katholikon in Athens, Greece

Church of the Pantanassa
- Εκκλησία της Παντανάσσης
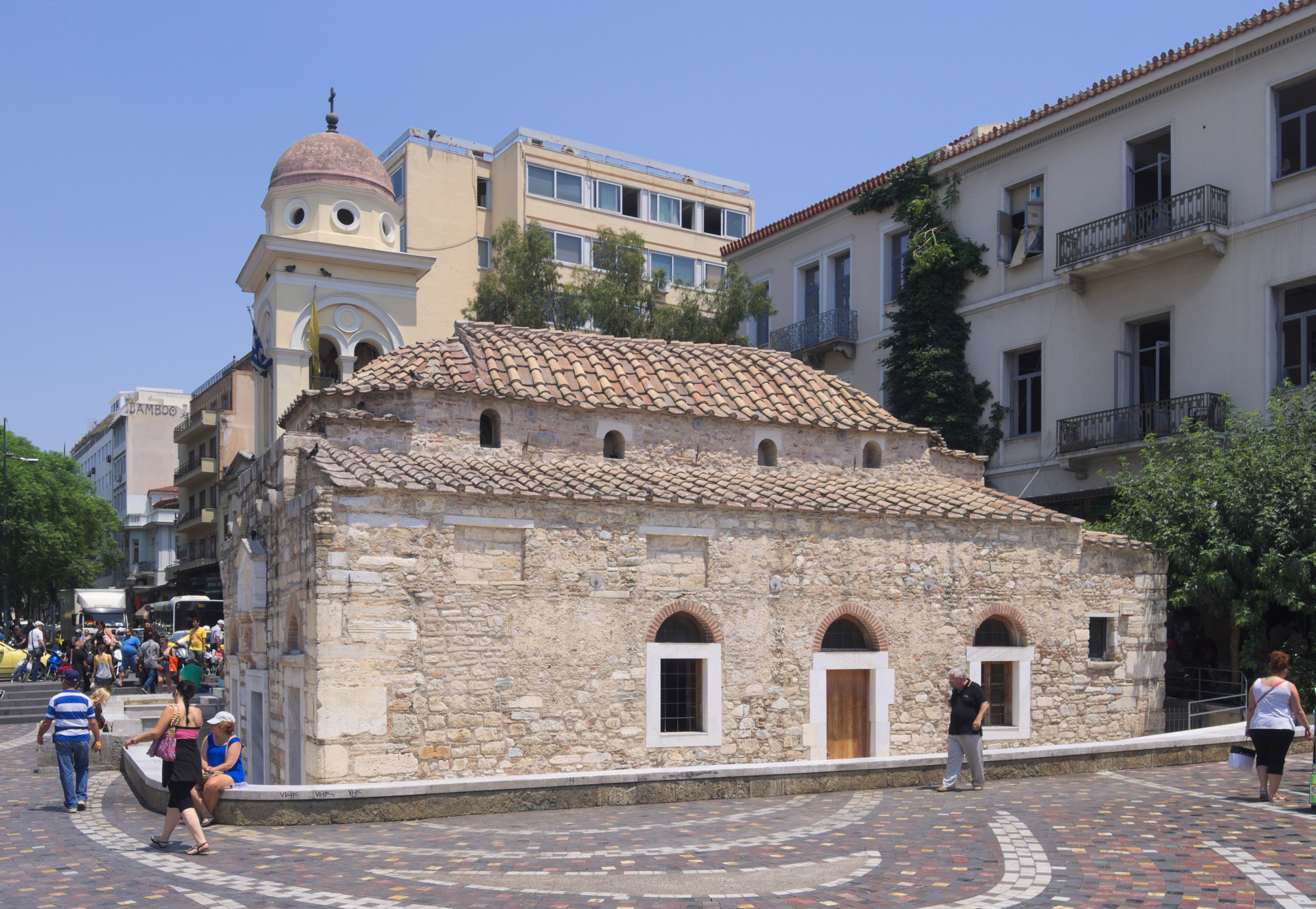

- Location of the church in Greece
- Church of the Pantanassa
- 37°58′35″N 23°43′34″E
- Location: Monastiraki Square, Central Athens
- Country: Greece
- Language: Greek
- Denomination: Eastern Orthodox

History
- Former name: Great Monastery
- Status: Church
- Dedication: Dormition of the Theotokos

Architecture
- Functional status: Active
- Architectural type: katholikon
- Style: Byzantine
- Completed: 10th century

The Church of the Pantanassa (Greek: Εκκλησία της Παντανάσσης), also known as the Dormition of the Theotokos (Ιερός Ναός Κοιμήσεως της Θεοτόκου), is the 10th-century katholikon of a now-vanished monastery in Monastiraki Square, between Athinas and Mitropoleos streets, facing the Monastiraki station, in central Athens, Greece. The church was known as the Great Monastery, and then later as monastiraki ("little monastery"), which eventually became the name of the whole area.

== See also ==
- List of Eastern Orthodox church buildings in Greece
- Tsisdarakis Mosque
