= John Phrangopoulos =

John Phrangopoulos or Frankopoulos (Greek: Ἰωάννης Φραγγόπουλος) was a Byzantine aristocrat and senior official in the Despotate of the Morea.

Member of a noble family of Frankish origin, he was protostrator and katholikos mesazon (chief minister) under the Despot of the Morea Theodore II Palaiologos in 1428/9. In this capacity he surrendered the towns and fortresses of Messenia—Androusa, Kalamata, Pidima, Mani, Nesin, Spitalin, Grembenin, Aetos, and Neokastron—which he governed in the name of Theodore II, to George Sphrantzes as the representative of Theodore's brother, Constantine XI Palaiologos. In June 1443 he was witness, at Constantinople, of the exchange of appanages between Constantine and Theodore: Theodore took over Constantine's domain of Selymbria, while the latter became sole master of the Morea. John apparently returned to the Morea and henceforth served Constantine as his mesazon, as he is mentioned in an argyrobull of Constantine XI Palaiologos as the "generalis of my realm" in February 1444.

At an unknown time, he founded the Pantanassa Monastery in the Despotate's capital of Mystras, to which he also donated an icon of the Virgin Mary. A mansion in Mystras has also been attributed to him on the basis of a Phi monogram embedded on a slab on the building.

== Sources ==
- Guilland, Rodolphe (1967). "Le Protostrator". Recherches sur les institutions byzantines [Studies on the Byzantine Institutions]. Berliner byzantinische Arbeiten 35 (in French). Vol. I. Berlin and Amsterdam: Akademie-Verlag & Adolf M. Hakkert. pp. 478–497. OCLC 878894516.
- Kazhdan, Alexander, ed. (1991). The Oxford Dictionary of Byzantium. Oxford and New York: Oxford University Press. ISBN 0-19-504652-8.
- Trapp, Erich; Beyer, Hans-Veit; Walther, Rainer; Sturm-Schnabl, Katja; Kislinger, Ewald; Leontiadis, Ioannis; Kaplaneres, Sokrates (1976–1996). Prosopographisches Lexikon der Palaiologenzeit (in German). Vienna: Verlag der Österreichischen Akademie der Wissenschaften. ISBN 3-7001-3003-1.
