= Monastiraki =

Monastiraki Μοναστηράκι
- Neighborhood
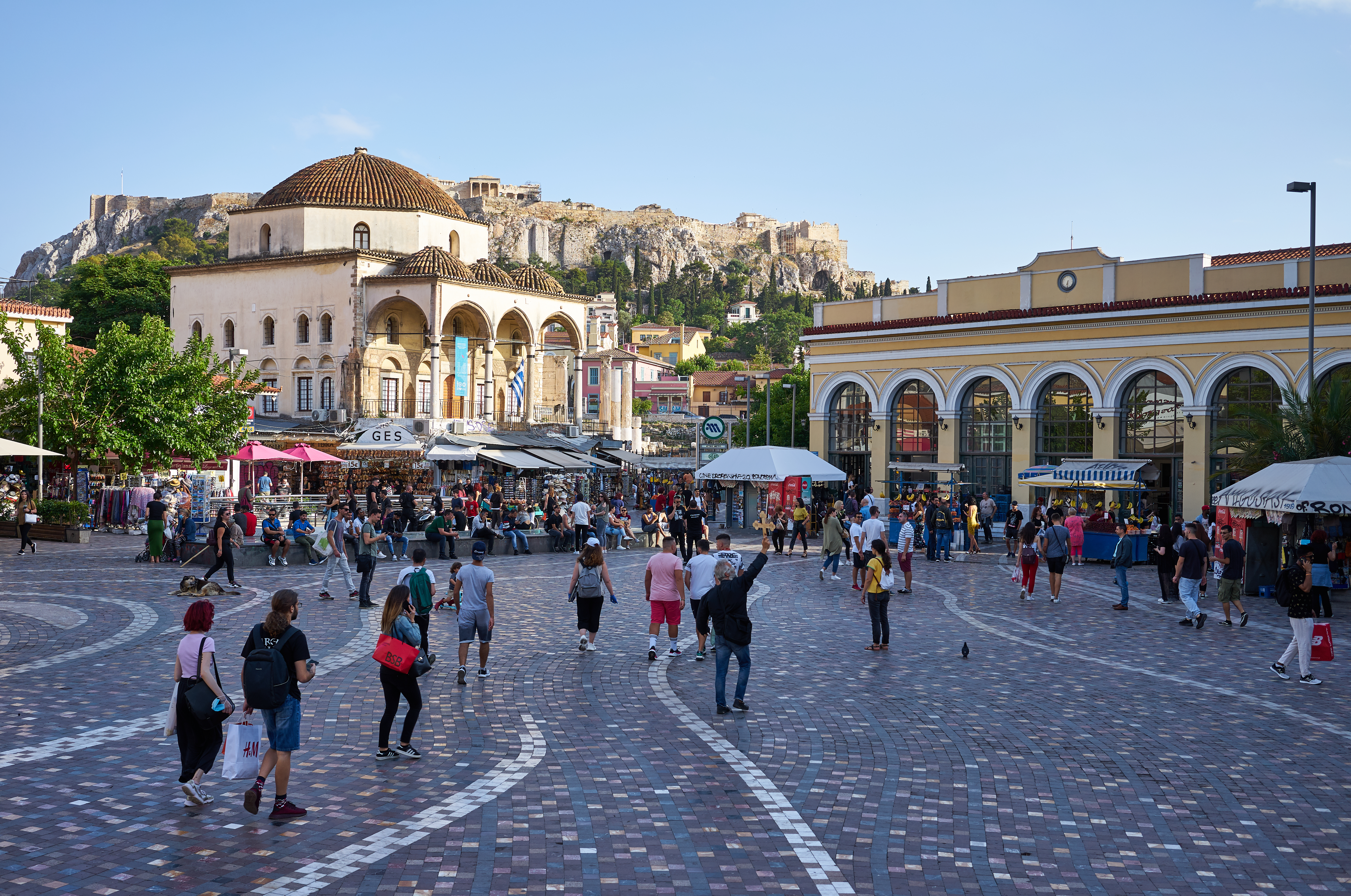
- Monastiraki square

- Location within Athens municipality
- Coordinates: 37°58′35″N 23°43′25″E
- Country: Greece
- Region: Attica
- City: Athens
- Postal code: 105 55, 105 56, 105 63
- Area code: 210
- Website: www.cityofathens.gr

Monastiraki (Greek: Μοναστηράκι, pronounced [monastiˈraci], lit. 'little monastery') is a flea market neighborhood in the old town of Athens, Greece, and is one of the main shopping districts in Athens. The area is home to clothing boutiques, souvenir shops and specialty stores, and is a major tourist attraction in Athens and Attica for bargain shopping. The area is named after Monastiraki Square, which in turn is named for the Church of the Pantanassa that is located within the square. The main streets of this area are Pandrossou Street and Adrianou Street.

The Monastiraki Metro Station, located on the square, serves both Line 1 and Line 3 of the Athens Metro.

== Gallery ==
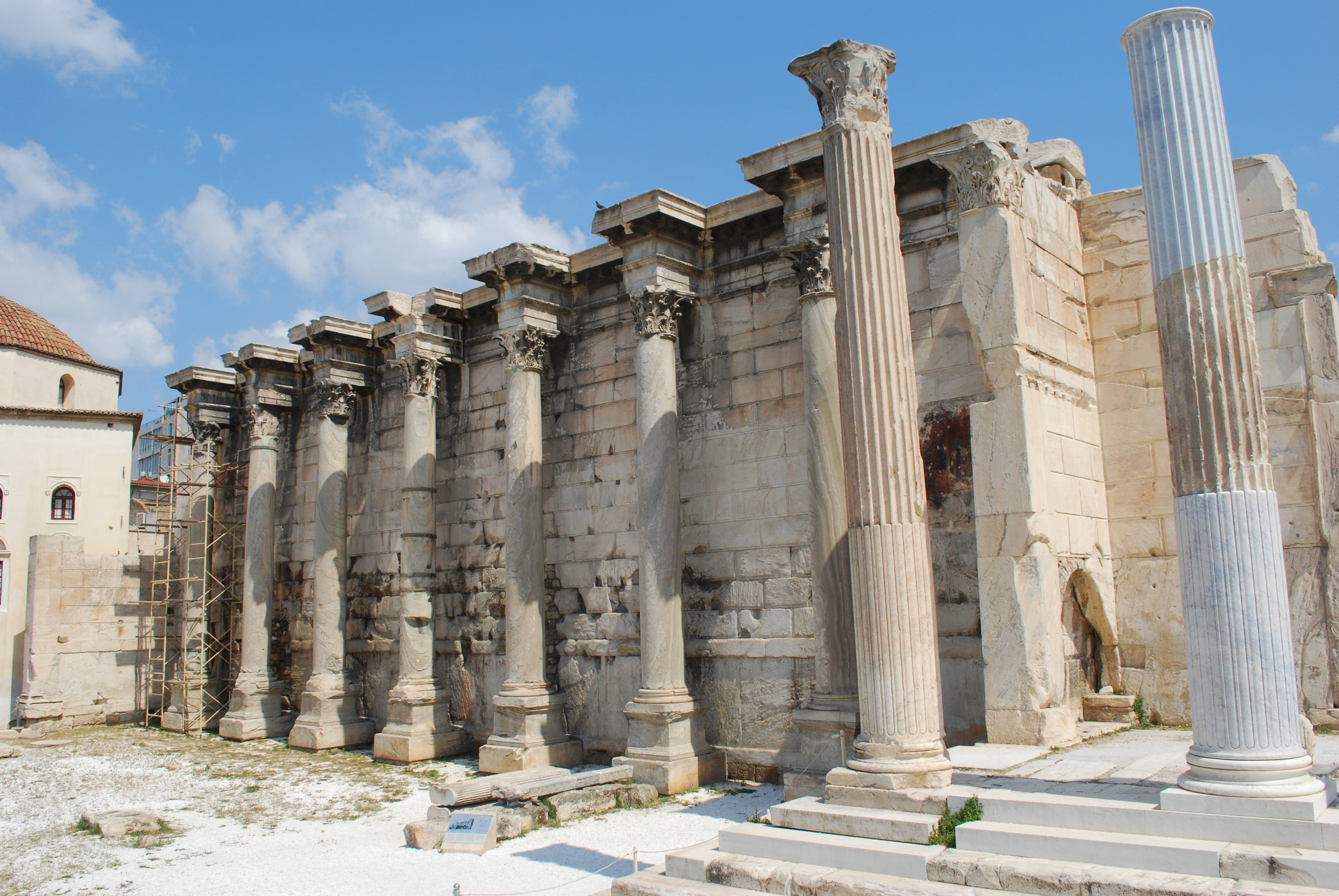
Hadrian's Library

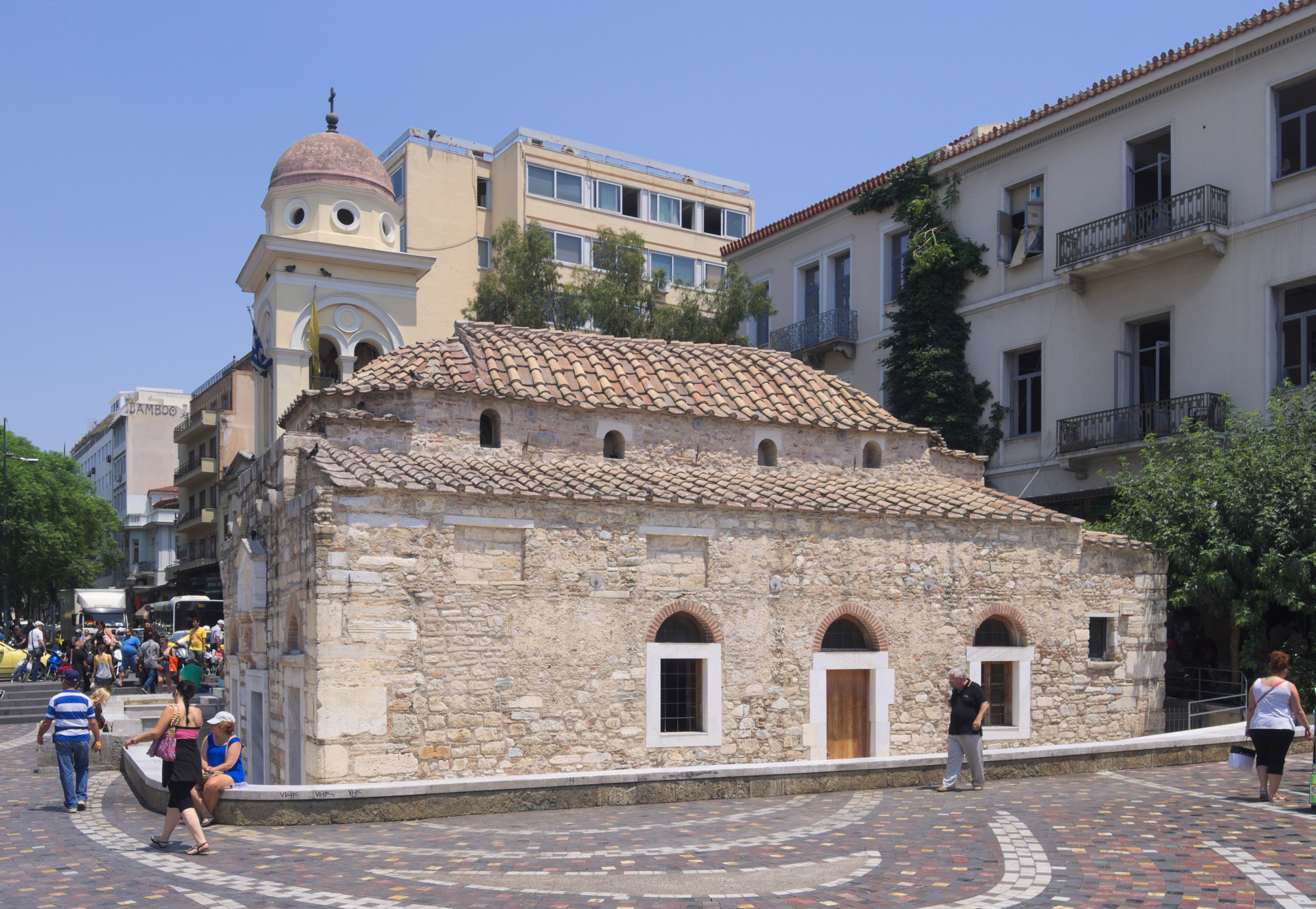
Pantanassa church

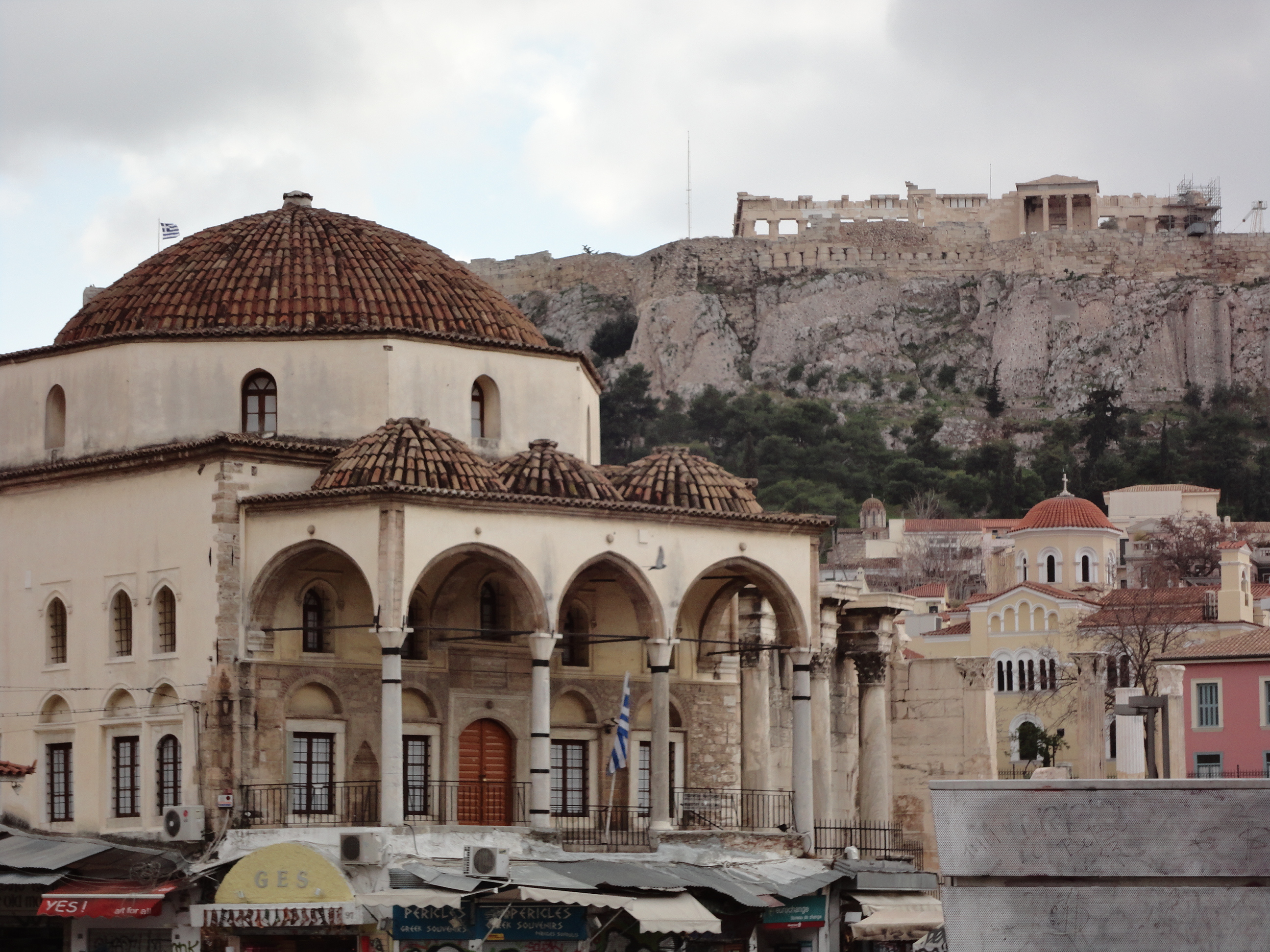
Tsisdarakis Mosque

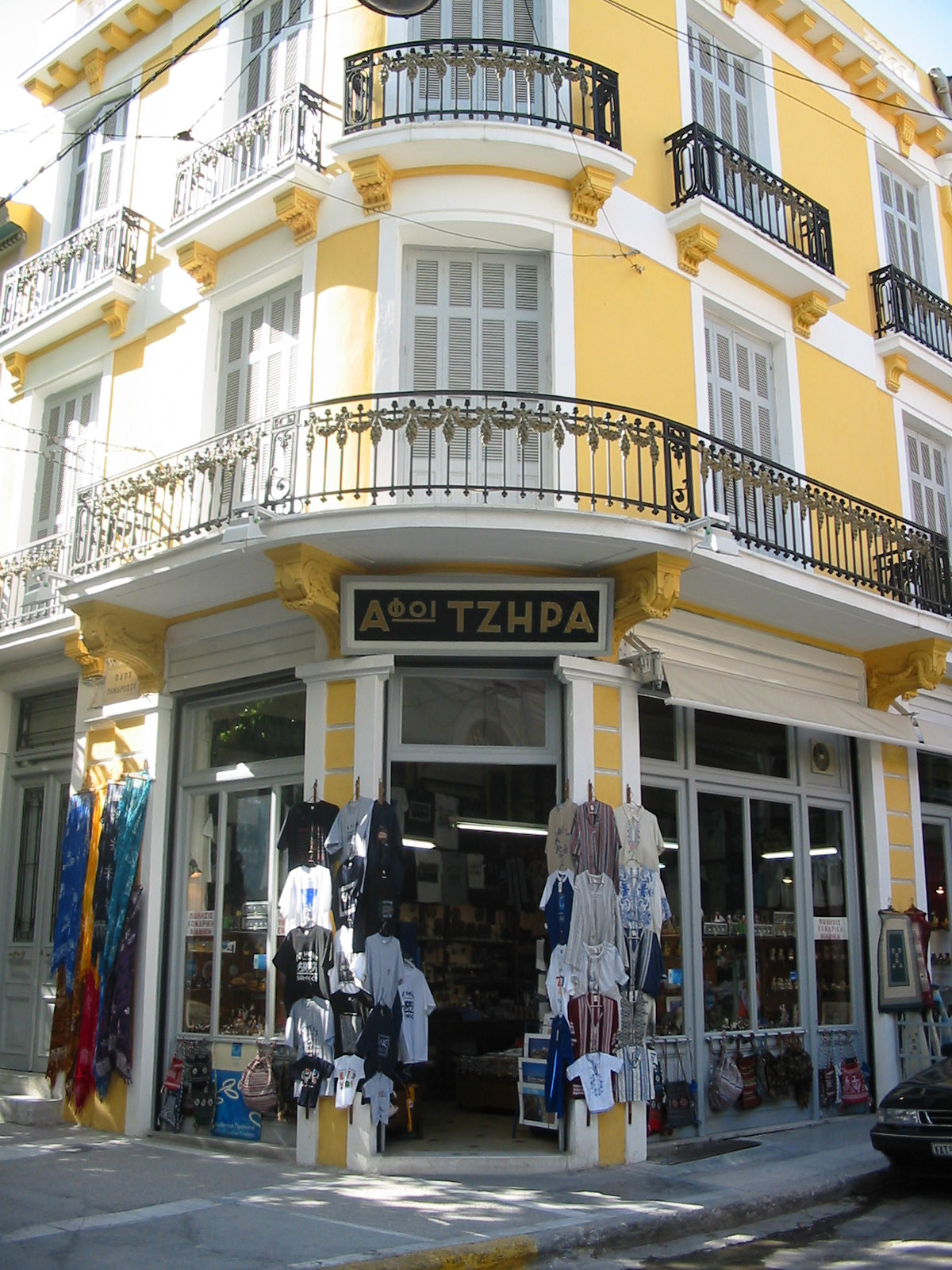
Souvenir shop on Pandrossou Street

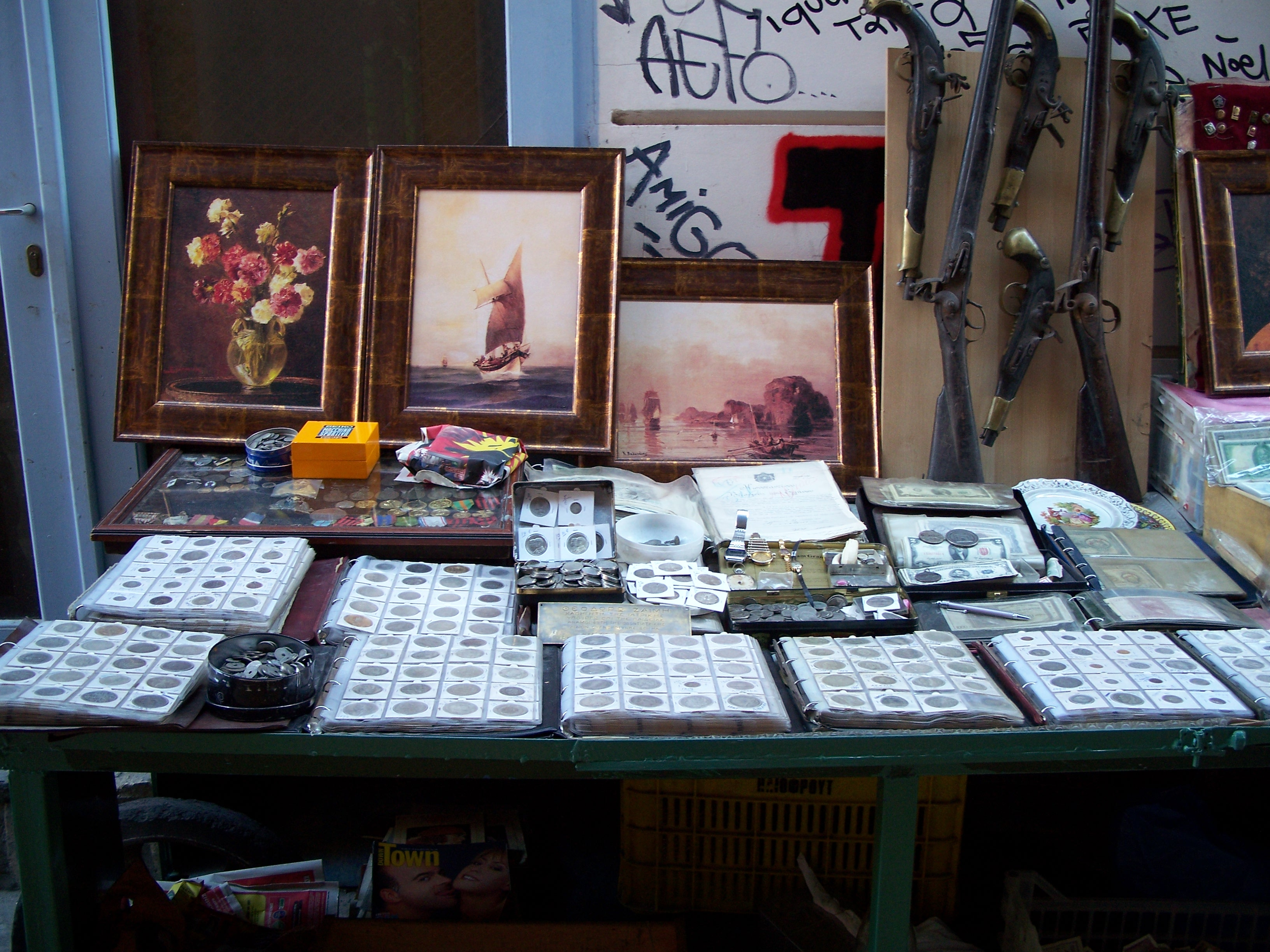
A stall dealing in collectible coins. Similar stalls can be found throughout Monastiraki
