= Pantanassa Monastery =

Former Eastern Orthodox monastery in the Peloponnese, Greece

- Μονή Παντανάσσης
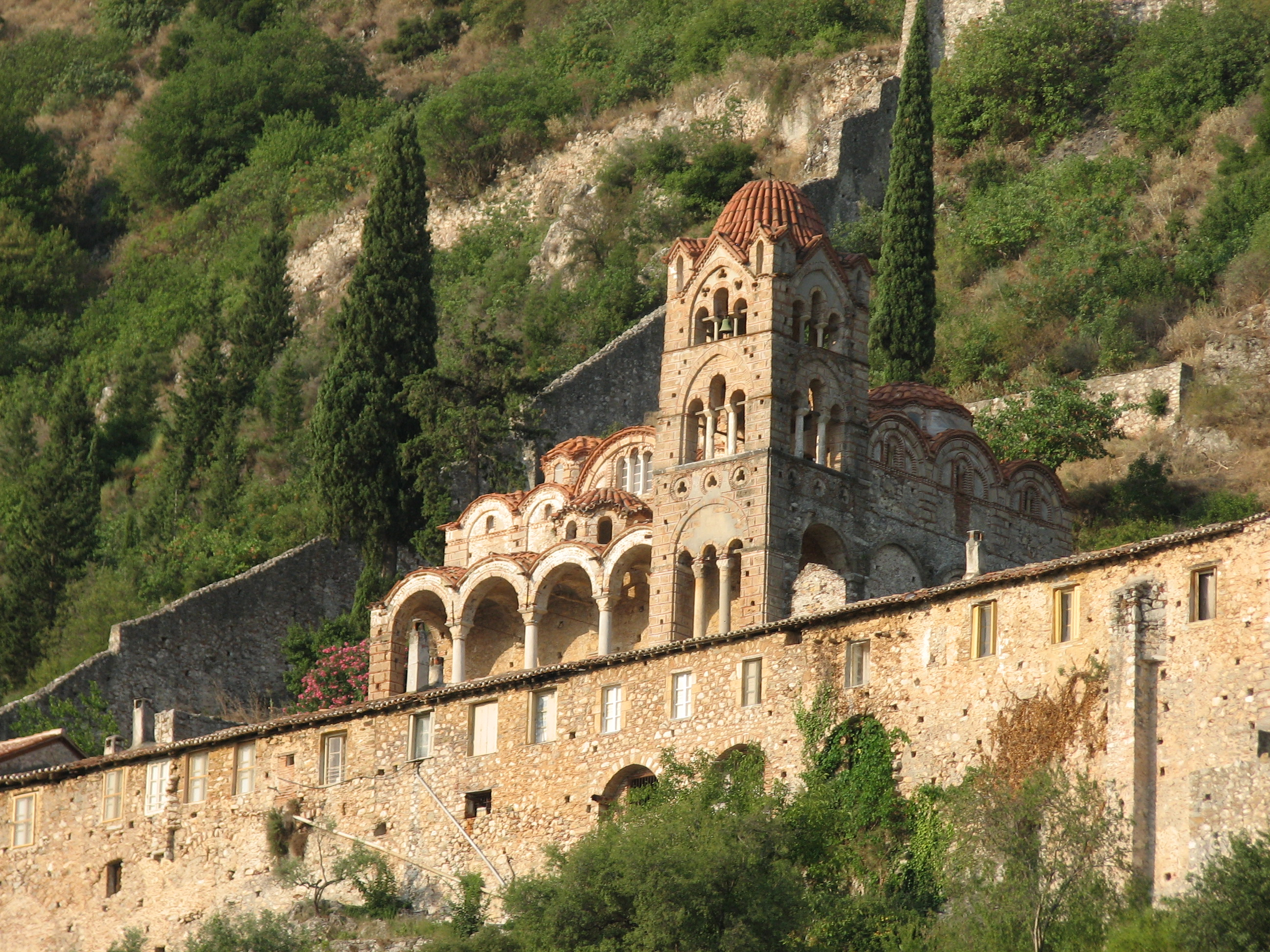
- The former monastery, now nunnery

- Location of the former monastery in Greece
- Interactive map of Pantanassa Monastery

Monastery information
- Order: Ecumenical Patriarchate of Constantinople
- Denomination: Eastern Orthodox Church

People
- Founder: Giannis Frankopoulos

Architecture
- Status: Monastery (former); Nunnery
- Functional status: Inactive (as a monastery); Repurposed (as a nunnery)
- Style: Byzantine; Gothic Revival
- Completed date: 1428

Site
- Location: Mystras, Peloponnese
- Country: Greece
- Coordinates: 37°04′23″N 22°22′08″E
- Website

UNESCO World Heritage Site
- Part of: Archaeological Site of Mystras
- Criteria: Cultural: ii, iii, iv
- Reference: 511
- Inscription: 1989 (13th Session)
- Area: 54.43 ha (134.5 acres)
- Buffer zone: 1,202.52 ha (2,971.5 acres)

The Pantanassa Monastery (Greek: Μονή Παντανάσσης) is a former Eastern Orthodox monastery, now nunnery, located in Mystras, in the Peloponnese region of Greece. It was founded by a chief minister of the late-Byzantine Despotate of the Morea, Giannis Frankopoulos, and was dedicated in September 1428. Although abandoned by monks, it is inhabited by nuns and is open to visitors. Mystras was once the home to several monasteries, it is the only monastery that remains permanently inhabited by a religious order.

Its "beautifully ornate stone-carved façade" is of architectural note; completed in a mix of Byzantine and Gothic Revival styles. The former monastery is part of the UNESCO World Heritage Site of Mystras, inscribed in 1989.

== Gallery ==
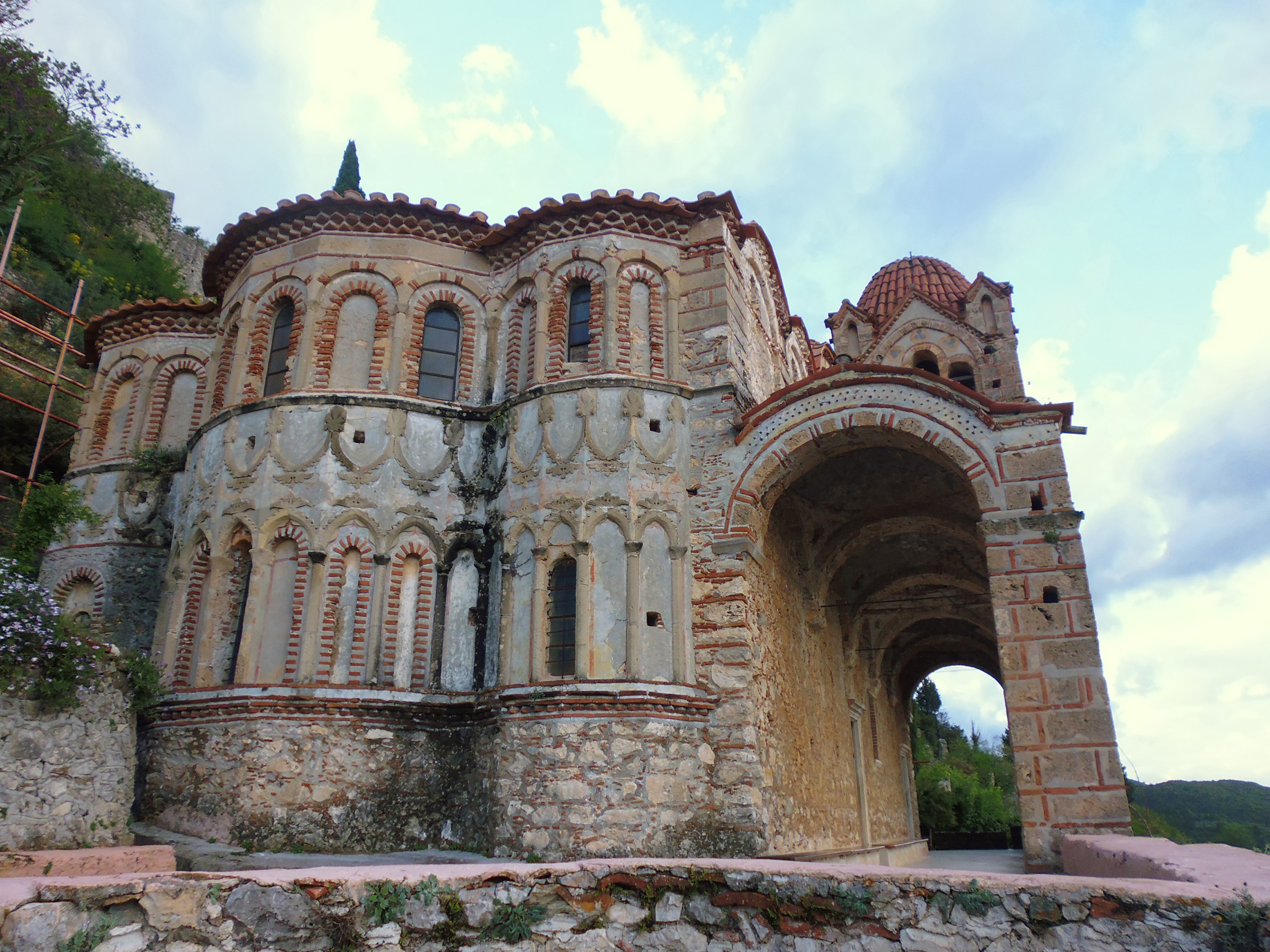
Detail of the stone façade in 2017

A plan of Mystras, with the former monastery marked as number 15

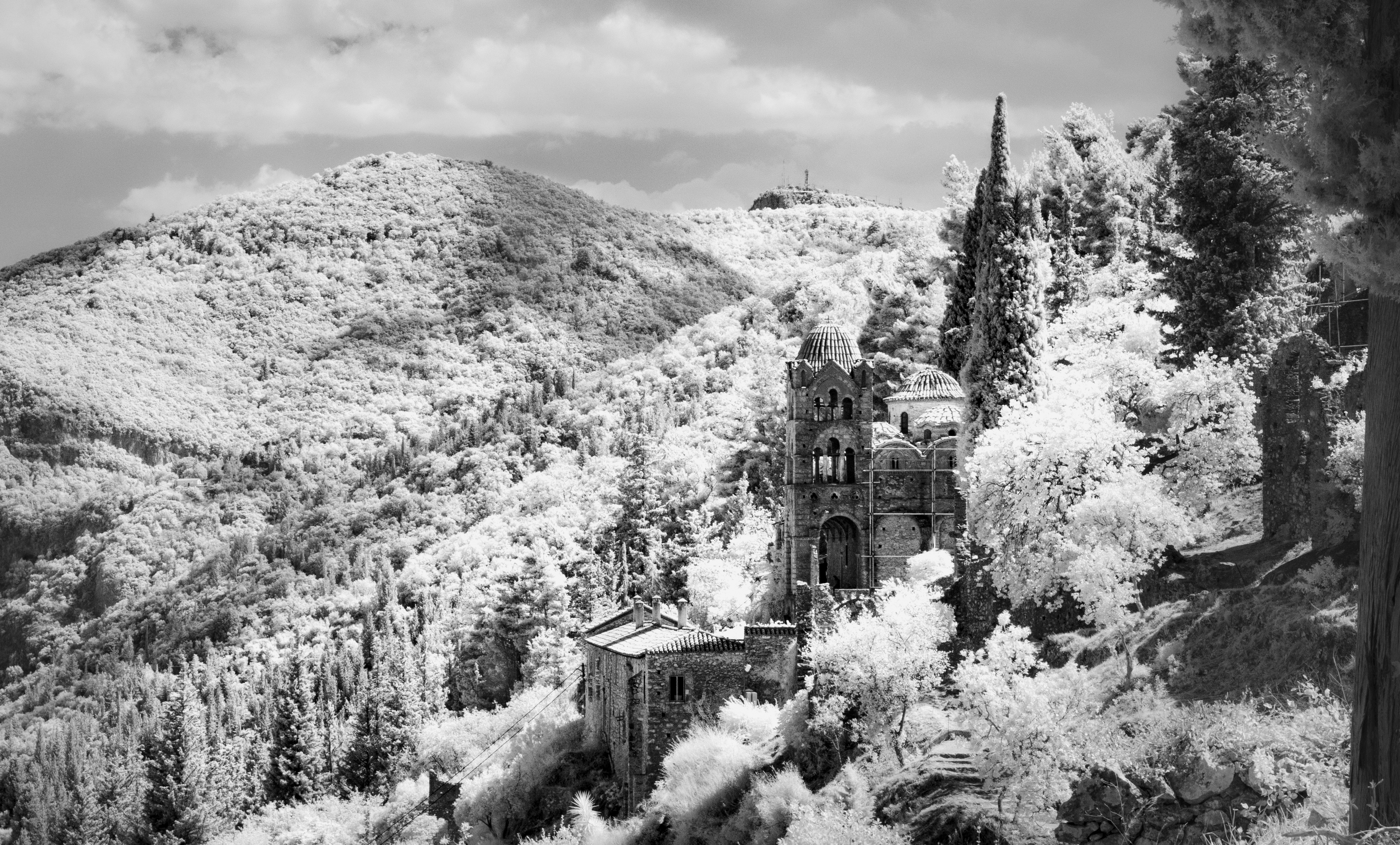
Overlooking the former monastery, winter 2025

== See also ==
- Ancient Roman and Byzantine domes
- List of monasteries in Greece
