= Tzistarakis Mosque =

Former mosque, now museum, in Athens, Greece

- Τζαμί Τζισταράκη
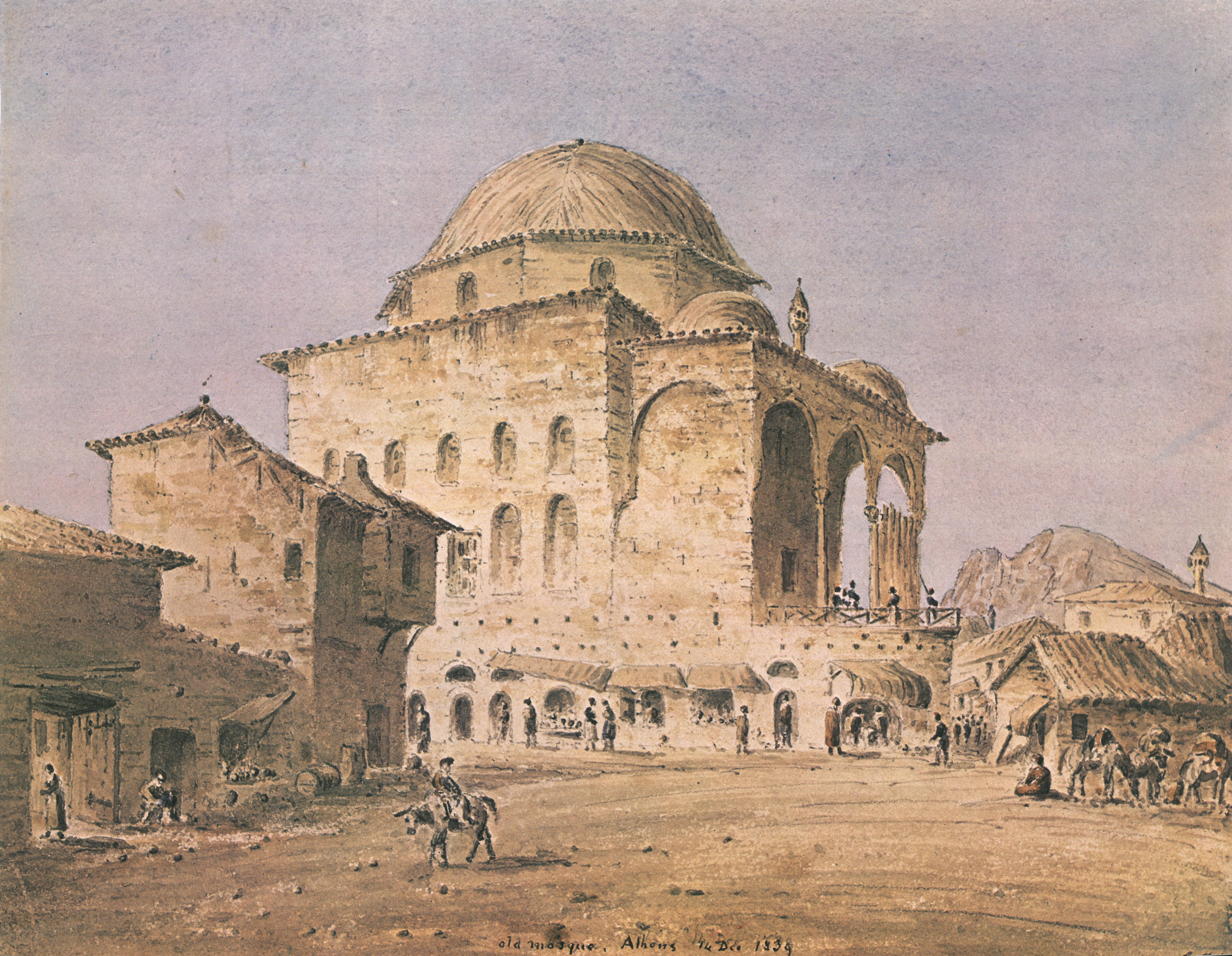
- An illustration of the former mosque in 1839

- Location of the former mosque, now museum, in Central Athens

Religion
- Affiliation: Islam (former)
- Ecclesiastical or organizational status: Mosque (1759–1820s); Profane use (since 1820s– )
- Status: Abandoned (as a mosque); Repurposed (as a museum)

Location
- Location: Plateia Monastirakiou, Central Athens, Attica
- Country: Greece
- Interactive map of Tzistarakis Mosque
- Coordinates: 37°58′33″N 23°43′34″E

Architecture
- Architect: Anastasios Orlandos (1915)
- Type: Mosque
- Style: Ottoman
- Founder: Mustapha Agha Tzistarakis
- Completed: 1759 (as a mosque); 1915 (as a museum)
- Domes: 1 (main); 3 (smaller)
- Museum of Greek Folk Art
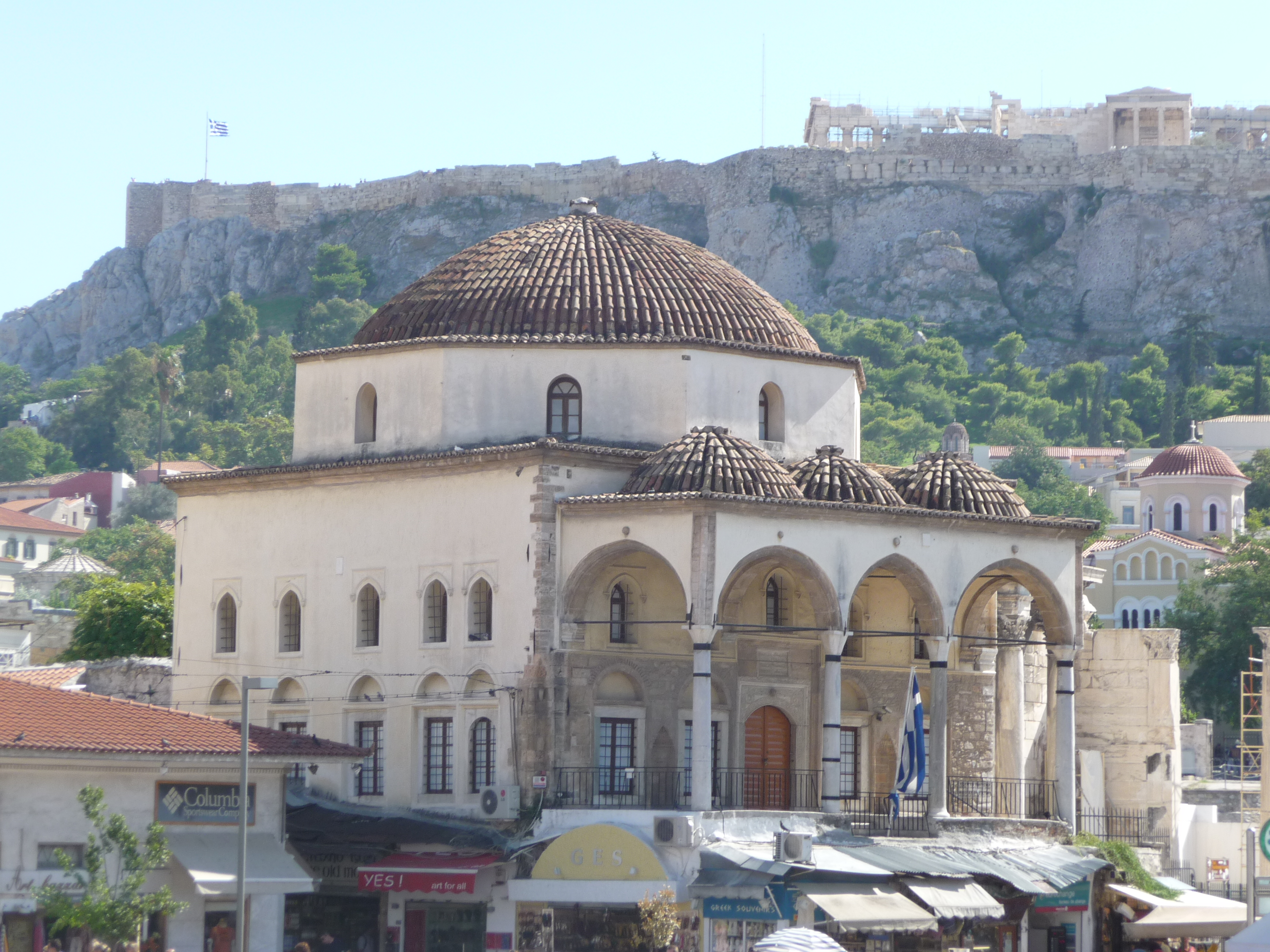
- The museum in 2009
- Location: Plateia Monastirakiou
- Type: Traditional art
- Collection size: 4,250+ objects
- Public transit access: Monastiraki

The Tzistarakis Mosque (Greek: Τζαμί Τζισταράκη, Turkish: Cizderiye Camii) is a former mosque in Monastiraki Square, central Athens, in the Attica region of Greece. Built in 1759 during the Ottoman era, the building has since been repurposed as a traditional art museum – as an annex of the Museum of Greek Folk Art.

The former mosque was also known as the Mosque of the Lower Fountain (Τζαμί του Κάτω Σιντριβανιού), or the Mosque of the Lower Market (Τζαμί του Κάτω Παζαριού), due to its proximity to the Ancient Agora of Athens.

== History ==
The mosque was built in 1759, by the Ottoman governor (voevoda) of Athens, Mustapha Agha Tzistarakis (Turkish: Dizdar Mustafa Ağa, Dizdar being the Turkish term for "commander of a fort"). According to tradition, Tzistarakis used one of the pillars of the Temple of Olympian Zeus to make lime for the building, although it is more likely that he used one of the columns of the nearby Hadrian's Library. This act led to his dismissal as the Turks considered it a sacrilege which would cause vengeful spirits to be loosened upon the city, a superstition that some Athenians believed to have been confirmed when there was an outbreak of the plague later in the year.

During the Greek War of Independence, the building was used as an assembly hall for the local town elders. After Greek independence, it was used in various ways: thus it was the site of a ball in honour of King Otto of Greece in March 1834, and was also employed as a barracks, a prison and a storehouse.

In 1915, it was partly rebuilt under the supervision of architect Anastasios Orlandos, and was used from 1918 until 1973 to house the Museum of Greek Handwork (renamed as the National Museum of Decorative Arts in 1923). In 1966, it was provisionally refurbished to provide a place of prayer in the city during the stay of the deposed King of Saudi Arabia, Saud.

In 1973, the main functions of the Museum of Greek Folk Art moved to 17 Kydathinaion Str., with the mosque remaining as an annex to it. The V. Kyriazopoulos pottery collection of ceramics remains in the mosque to this day. In 1981, the building was damaged by an earthquake and was re-opened to the public in 1991.

== See also ==
- Islam in Greece
- List of former mosques in Greece
- List of museums in central Athens
- Ottoman Athens
