= Athens–Piraeus Electric Railways =

Railway company in Greece (1869-2011)

Coordinates: 37.98310°N 23.72755°E

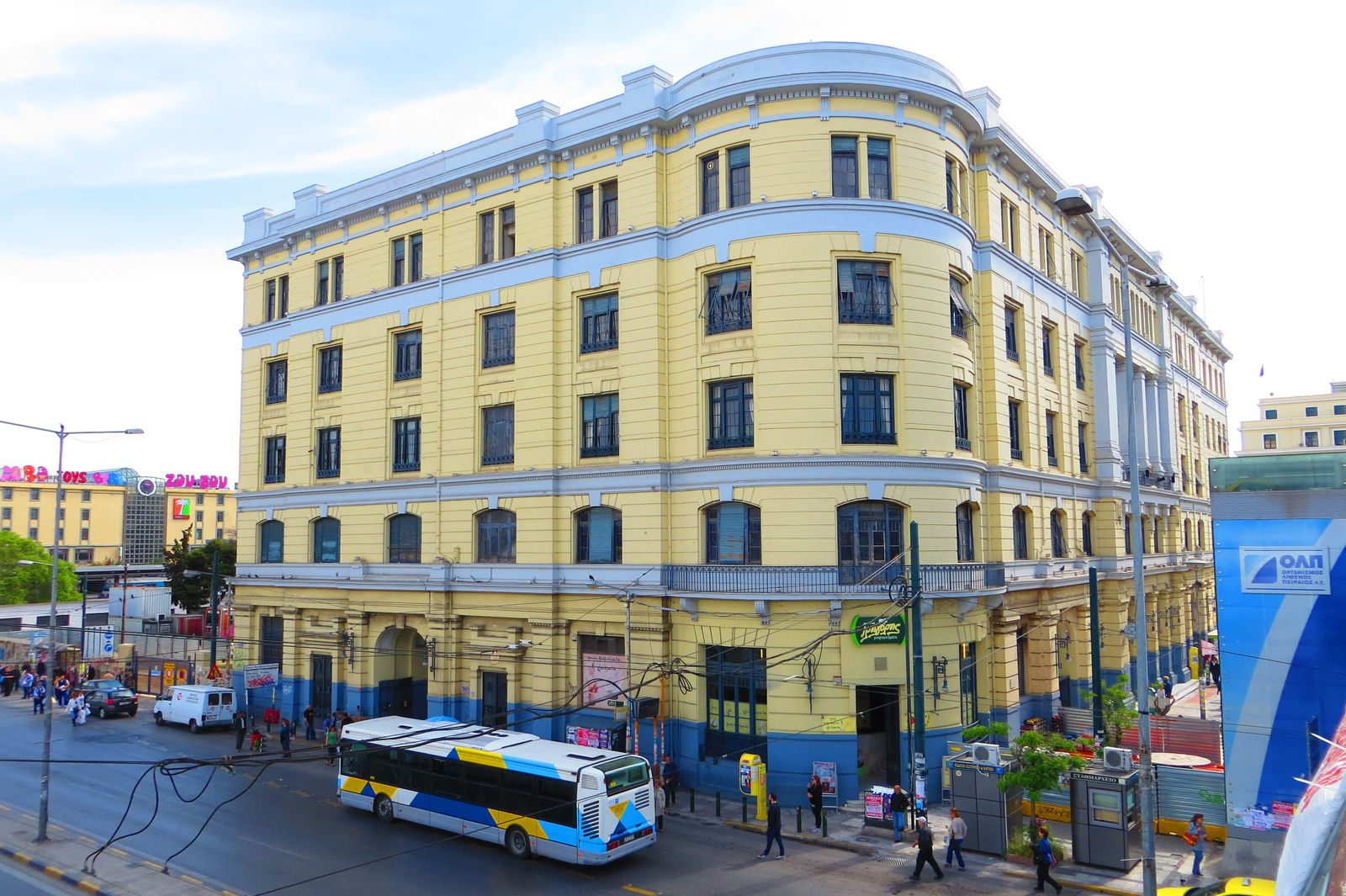
- Piraeus station
- Native name: Ηλεκτρικοί Σιδηρόδρομοι Αθηνών Πειραιώς
- Romanized name: Ilektrikoi Sidirodromoi Athinon Peiraios
- Type: Anonymi Etaireia (SA)
- Predecessors: Athens and Piraeus Railway (SAP, 1869–1926); Hellenic Electric Railways (EIS, 1926–1976)
- Founded: 1 January 1976; 50 years ago in Athens, Greece
- Defunct: June 17, 2011
- Fate: Merged
- Successor: STASY
- Headquarters: Athinas 67; 105 52 Athens, Greece
- Area served: Greater Athens
- Owner: Athens Urban Transport Organisation (100%)
- Number of employees: 1003 (2011)
- Website: isap.gr (defunct)

The Athens–Piraeus Electric Railways (Greek: Ηλεκτρικοί Σιδηρόδρομοι Αθηνών Πειραιώς, romanized: Ilektrikoi Sidirodromoi Athinon Peiraios, ΗΣΑΠ), commonly abbreviated as ISAP, was a company which operated the Piraeus - Kifissia line from 1 January 1976 to 17 June 2011. Piraeus - Kifissia line was the oldest urban rapid transit system of Athens metropolitan area. The line opened in 1869 as a suburban railway line connecting Athens with its port of Piraeus and it was gradually converted to full rapid transit operations, making it one of the oldest metro lines in the world. The line which ISAP S.A. operated evolved from the older Athens & Piraeus Railway and Lavrion Square-Strofyli railway.

In June 2011 ISAP S.A. was absorbed by a new transport company, STASY.

== History ==
=== Athens and Piraeus Railway Company ===
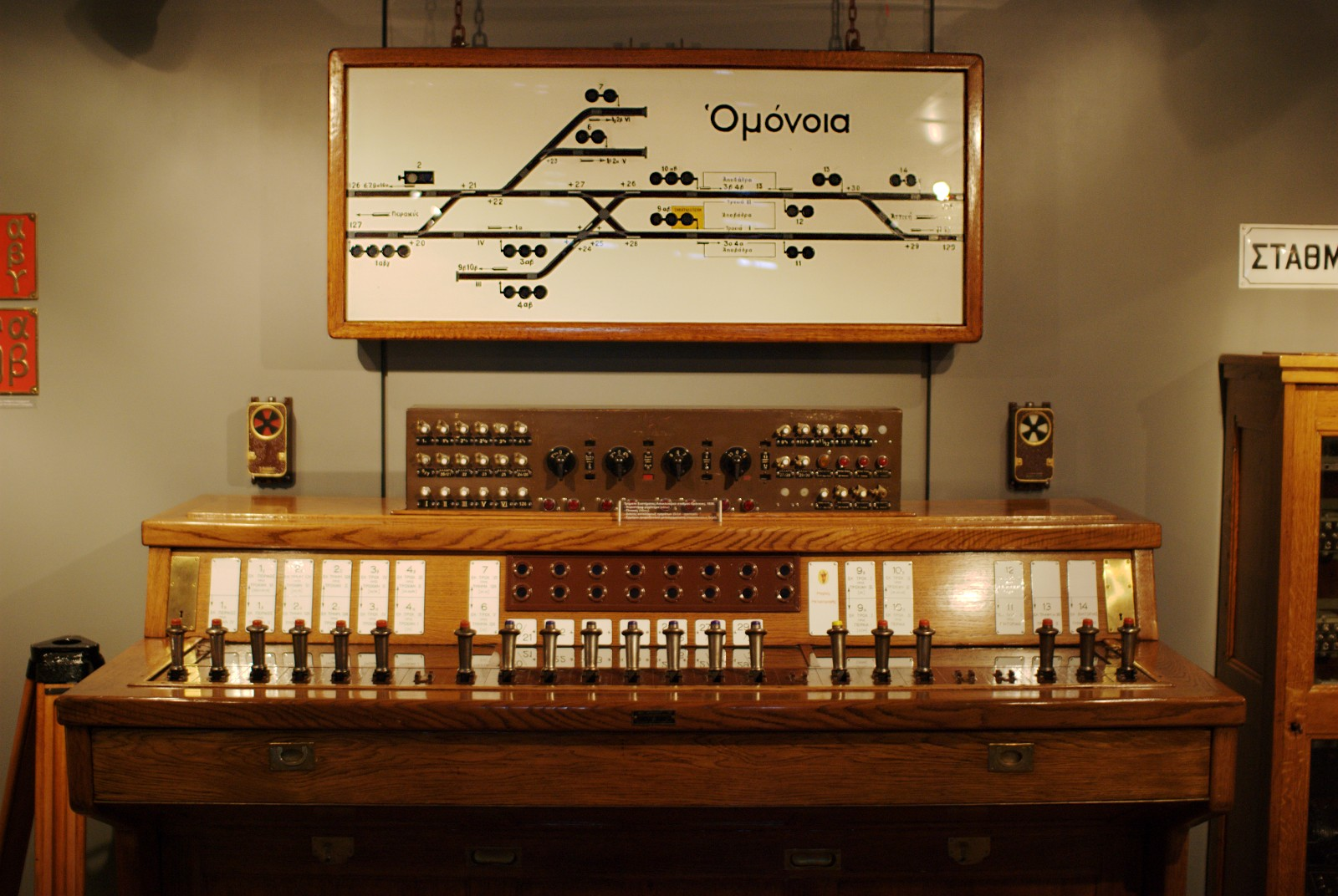
The old lever frame and track diagram of Omonoia station, now exhibited at the Electric Railways Museum.

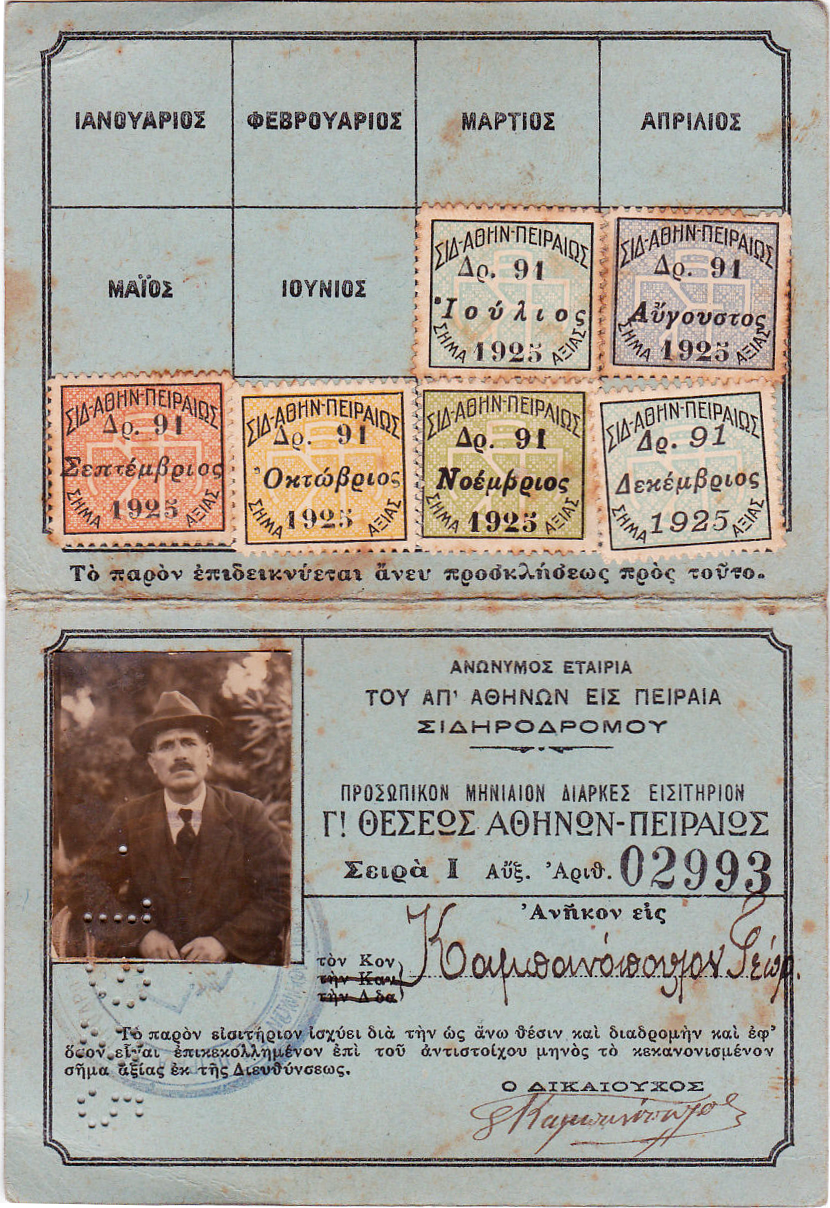
A 1925 season ticket of SAP

The line from Piraeus to Thision was inaugurated on 27 February 1869 as a steam train connecting Athens and its port, Piraeus, and was operated by Athens & Piraeus Railway Co (Greek: Σιδηρόδρομος Αθηνών-Πειραιώς or Greek: Σ.Α.Π. Α.Ε.) private company. The project was considered important, so Queen Olga and the Prime Minister Thrasyvoulos Zaimis attended the inauguration ceremony. There were 8 trains in each direction daily and 9 trains in each direction on Sundays.

In 1874 the Athens & Piraeus Railway Company was bought by the Bank of Industrial Credit (Greek: Τράπεζα Βιομηχανικής Πίστεως). Under the new ownership the railway procured additional rolling stock. Soon the line was extended to Omonoia Square with an underground section constructed with the cut-and-cover method.

The line was electrified in 1904 using the 600 V DC, third rail, top contact system by Thomson Houston.

=== Hellenic Electric Railways Company ===
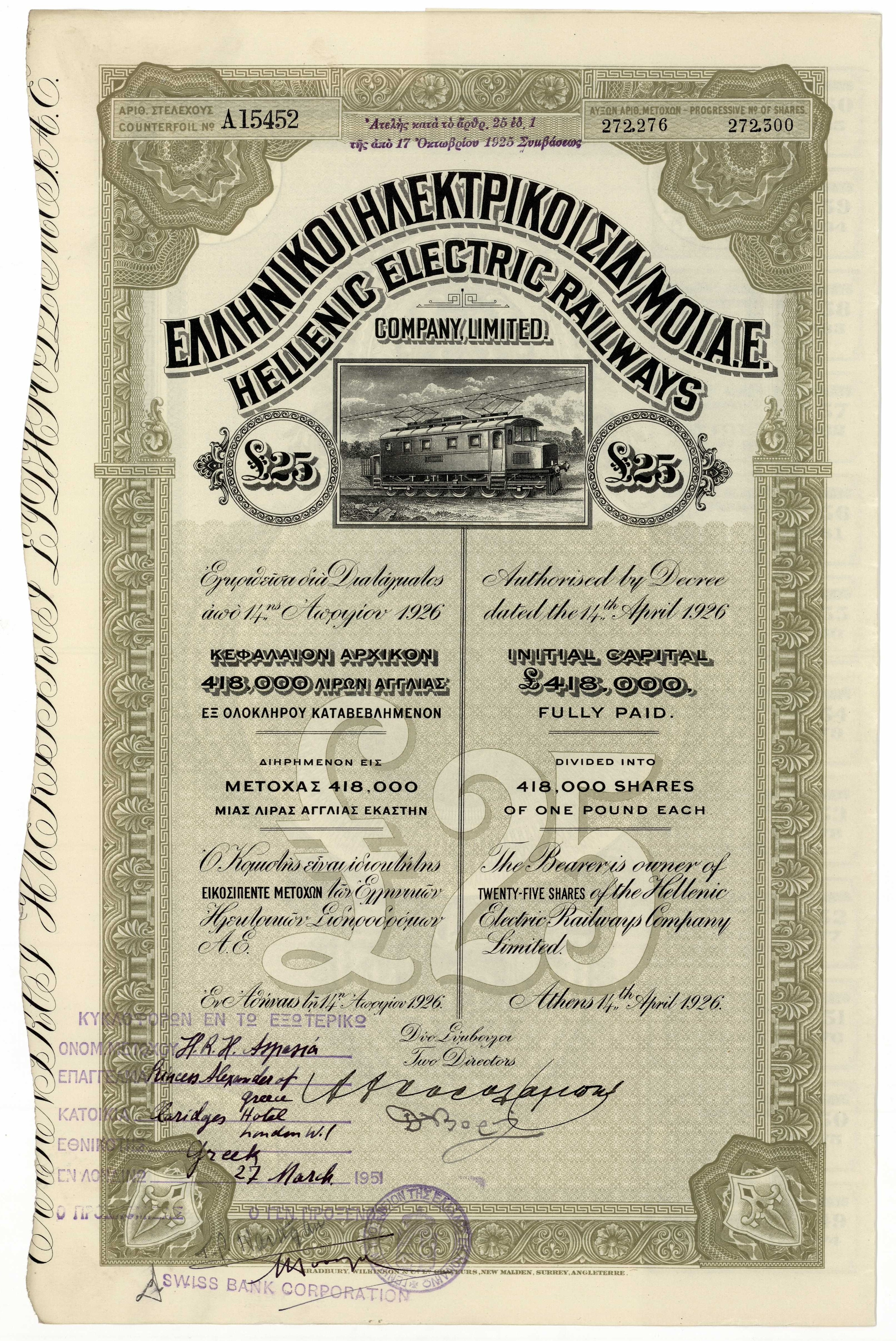
Share of the Hellenic Electric Railways Company Ltd., issued 14. April 1926

In 1926 the SAP S.A. was bought by the Power and Traction Finance Ltd and renamed Ellinikoi Ilektrikoi Sidirodromoi (E.I.S., Greek: Ελληνικοί Ηλεκτρικοί Σιδηρόδρόμοι or Greek: Ε.Η.Σ., translated as Hellenic Electric Railways). In 1926 the sister company Ilektriki Etaireia Metaforon or H.E.M., also part of Power Group, took over the 1,000 mm (3 ft 3 3/8 in) metre gauge Lavrion Square-Strofyli railway. This line was eventually converted to standard gauge, double track and became an extension of the existing line, reaching Attiki in 1948 and Kifissia in 1958.

=== Athens-Piraeus Electric Railways ===
In 1976 E.I.S. was nationalized and renamed Athens-Piraeus Electric Railways S.A. (I.S.A.P).

A merger of ISAP with Athens Metro was dictated by Law 2668 in 1998, however it was postponed indefinitely and the required Presidential Decree was never issued. In January 2011 the Greek Government announced their plans to merge ISAP with Attiko Metro Etaireia Leitourgias S.A. (AMEL), the company which operates Athens Metro lines 2,3, and with Athens Tram S.A. in a single new company.

In March 2011, the Greek Government passed Law 3920 to allow ISAP and Athens Tram to be absorbed by Attiko Metro Operations Company (AMEL). The new company created from the mergers is named STASY (Greek: ΣΤΑΣΥ Α.Ε.) and is a subsidiary of OASA S.A. The merger was officially announced on 10 June 2011.

STASY is based at the former ISAP head offices, near Omonoia Square in Athens. Kostas Vassiliadis, a former chief engineer (1976–1991) and later CEO of ISAP between 1997 and 2000 became chairman and CEO of the merged company until the end of 2012.

== Network and stations ==
ISAP
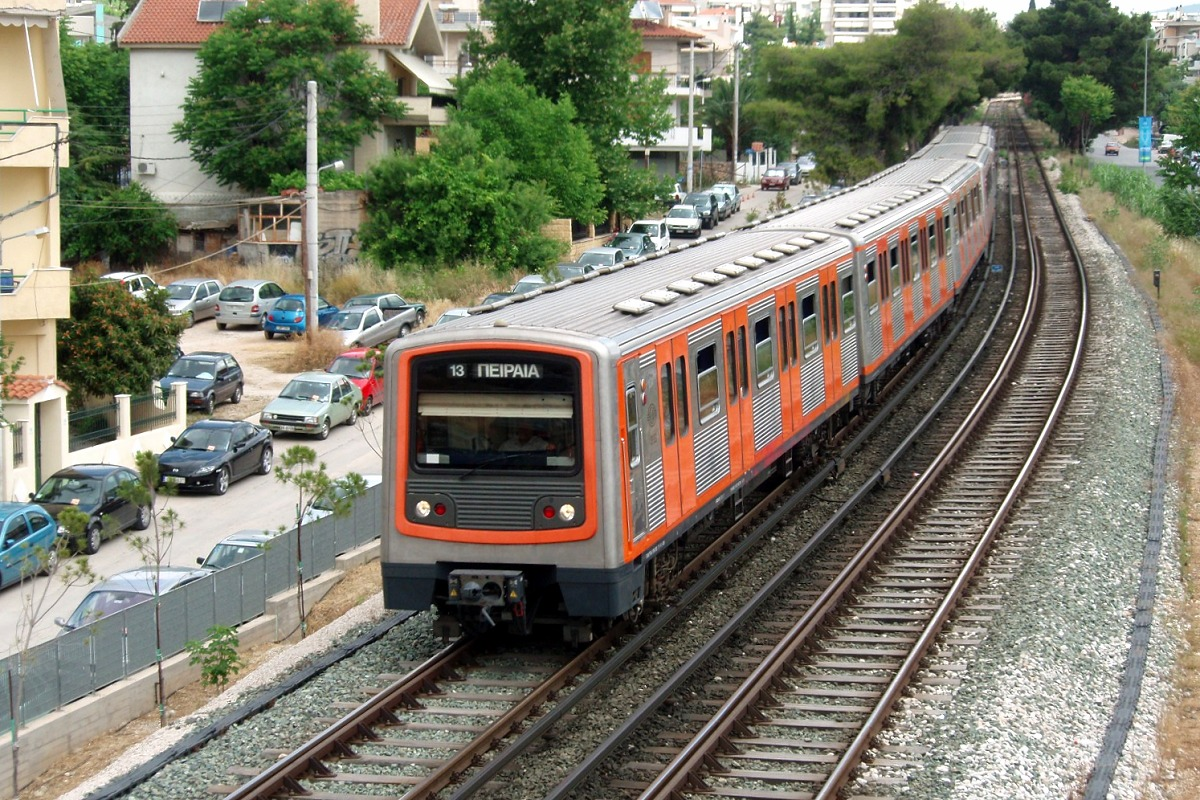
- Southbound ISAP train enters Neratziotissa station

Technical
- Track gauge: 1,435 mm (4 ft 8 1/2 in) standard gauge
- Length: 25.657 km (15.943 mi)

=== Network ===
ISAP's line connected the port of Piraeus with the northern suburb of Kifissia. As it was originally designed for steam traction, the line runs mostly above ground. However, there are no level crossings. It is built to 1,435 mm (4 ft 8 1/2 in) standard gauge and is electrified using the 750 V DC, third rail, top contact system, also used by Athens Metro Lines 2 and 3. The two lines (ISAP and Metro Line 2) have a physical connection at Attiki station.

From Piraeus the line runs eastwards to Neo Faliro and then north to Thision. Between Monastiraki and Attiki the line runs underground. At Monastiraki passengers can change to Metro line 3 and at Omonoia and Attiki to Metro line 2. From Attiki the line continues north, following the alignment of the old Lavrion Square-Strofyli railway through Patissia, the suburbs of Nea Ionia, Irakleio, Marousi and terminates at Kifissia. At Neratziotissa passengers can change to the Athens Suburban Railway for Athens International Airport.

=== Stations ===
Station	km	Notes
Piraeus	0.000	next to the port, is the southernmost station of ISAP. The Electric Railways Museum of Piraeus, a small museum of urban transport (SAP, EIS, ISAP and former tram lines) is located in the station, at the former Post Office. A train depot and rolling stock repair facilities are located next to the station. Part of the station and most adjacent engine sheds and works were destroyed on 11 January 1944 by Allied bombing during World War II.
Faliro	2.110	near Faliro Coastal Zone Olympic Complex (Peace and Friendship Stadium and Karaiskákis Stadium) and close to a terminal of Athens Tram S.E.F. (Σ.E.Φ.) The station includes a rolling stock depot
Moschato	3.980	
Kallithea	5.560	
Tavros	6.140	with a train reversing siding
Petralona	7.015	
Thiseio	8.580	original terminus of the line when it opened in 1869. Next to the passenger station there is a train depot and the permanent way maintenance department, with some specialized departmental rolling stock
Monastiraki	9.070	passenger interchange with Athens Metro Line 3
Omonoia	9.985	passenger interchange with Athens Metro Line 2
Victoria	11.000	
Attiki	12.245	passenger interchange with Athens Metro Line 2. At this station there is also a small depot and the railway connection with the Athens Metro Line 2
Agios Nikolaos	13.160	
Kato Patisia	13.726	
Agios Eleftherios	14.448	
Ano Patisia	15.262	with a train reversing siding
Perissos	16.554	
Pefkakia	17.230	
Nea Ionia	17.918	with a train reversing siding
Irakleio	19.246	with a train reversing siding
Eirini	20.846	near the Athens Olympic Stadium. The signalling and control center for the ISAP line and a train washing facility are located next to the station
Nerantziotissa	21.824	passenger interchange with the Athens Suburban Railway. Near the Mall Athens
Marousi	23.453	
KAT	24.6.31	near the KAT Hospital
Kifissia	25.657	the northernmost terminus

== Proposed northern extension ==
An extension to the north was under consideration that would have been built in two phases, reaching Nea Erithrea by the end of the first phase and Agios Stefanos by the end of the second phase. Due to lack of funding, this extension was canceled in 2011.

== Rolling stock ==
=== First generation EMUs ===
Since electrification (1904) the railway used almost exclusively electric multiple unit (EMU) trains. The vehicles are classified in batches (or deliveries). The first four batches consisted of wooden passenger cars on iron or steel frames. Currently only a short train of two wooden railcars is preserved, modified with the addition of Scharfenberg couplers at each end and is displayed during special events.

Batch	Year	Description	Photograph
1st		Locomotive hauled stock	
2nd	1904	40 railcars (20 DM and 20 T) made by Thomson Houston/Desouches David & Cie. Withdrawn in 1985.	
3rd	1914	9 railcars made by Baume et Marpent/Desouches David & Cie. Withdrawn in 1985.	
4th	1923	12 railcars of the Baume et Marpent design, built at Piraeus Works. Withdrawn 1985.	
-	1947–1948	Rebuilding and modernization of damaged rolling stock	

The first generation rolling stock was numbered as in the following table:

Marking	number	type
A1 to A11	11	DT
Γ417 to Γ427	11	DT
F410 to F418	18	T
B601 to B621	21	DM
Total	61	

=== Second generation EMUs ===
The fifth (1951), sixth (1958) and seventh (1968) batches were of steel construction, made by Siemens-MAN. At the same time Scharfenberg couplers were introduced.

Batch	Year	Configuration	Type	Numbering	Description	Photograph
5th	1951	DM-DT or DM-DTL	DM	901–912	24 railcars, in 12 EMU-2 trains. Withdrawn in 1995.	
5th	1951	DM-DT or DM-DTL	DTL	701–706	24 railcars, in 12 EMU-2 trains. Withdrawn in 1995.	
5th	1951	DM-DT or DM-DTL	DT	801–806	24 railcars, in 12 EMU-2 trains. Withdrawn in 1995.	
6th	1958	DM-DT or DM-DTL	DM	913–928	32 railcars, in 16 EMU-2 trains. Withdrawn in 2003–2004.	
6th	1958	DM-DT or DM-DTL	DTL	707-714	32 railcars, in 16 EMU-2 trains. Withdrawn in 2003–2004.	
6th	1958	DM-DT or DM-DTL	DT	807–814	32 railcars, in 16 EMU-2 trains. Withdrawn in 2003–2004.	
7th	1968–1969	DM-DT or DM-DTL	DM	929–937	18 railcars, in 8 EMU-2 trains. Some rearranged in EMU-5 trains. Withdrawn in 2003–2004.	
7th	1968–1969	DM-DT or DM-DTL	DTL	715–718	18 railcars, in 8 EMU-2 trains. Some rearranged in EMU-5 trains. Withdrawn in 2003–2004.	
7th	1968–1969	DM-DT or DM-DTL	DT	815–819	18 railcars, in 8 EMU-2 trains. Some rearranged in EMU-5 trains. Withdrawn in 2003–2004.	

=== Third generation EMUs ===
Batch 8 (1983–1985) consists of five-car trains made by Siemens-MAN. Trains of batch 9 were made by LEW in the German Democratic Republic and have been withdrawn. The trains of the 10th batch (1994), similar to those of the 8th batch, were built by Hellenic Shipyards S.A. using Simenes-MAN design and mechanical parts. The 11th batch (2000–2004) trains, with three phase AC motors were also constructed by Hellenic Shipyards S.A. using ADtranz-Siemens design and mechanical parts.

Batch	Year	Configuration	Type	Numbering	Description	Photograph
8th	1983–1985	DM-T-DM+DT-DM	DM	101–145	75 railcars made by MAN/Siemens, originally delivered as 4-car sets (M-M-M-M), and then trailers added to lengthen the trains to EMU-5 sets.	
8th	1983–1985	DM-T-DM+DT-DM	T	201–215	75 railcars made by MAN/Siemens, originally delivered as 4-car sets (M-M-M-M), and then trailers added to lengthen the trains to EMU-5 sets.	
8th	1983–1985	DM-T-DM+DT-DM	DT	301–315	75 railcars made by MAN/Siemens, originally delivered as 4-car sets (M-M-M-M), and then trailers added to lengthen the trains to EMU-5 sets.	
9th	1983–1985	DM-M+M-DM	DM	1101–1125	50 railcars made of aluminium LEW (type GIII) in EMU-4 sets later rearranged in EMU-6 (DM-M+M-DM+M-DM). In limited use after 1999 and all withdrawn until 2004.	
9th	1983–1985	DM-M+M-DM	M	2201–2225	50 railcars made of aluminium LEW (type GIII) in EMU-4 sets later rearranged in EMU-6 (DM-M+M-DM+M-DM). In limited use after 1999 and all withdrawn until 2004.	
10th	1993–1995	DM-T-DM+DT-DM	DM	146–175	50 railcars made by MAN-AEG/Siemens-Hellenic Shipyards in EMU-5 sets.	
10th	1993–1995	DM-T-DM+DT-DM	T	216–225	50 railcars made by MAN-AEG/Siemens-Hellenic Shipyards in EMU-5 sets.	
10th	1993–1995	DM-T-DM+DT-DM	DT	316–325	50 railcars made by MAN-AEG/Siemens-Hellenic Shipyards in EMU-5 sets.	
11th	2000–2004	DM-T-DM+DM-T-DM	DM	3101–3180	120 railcars coupled in 20 EMU-6 trains. Made by ADtranz-Siemens-Hellenic Shipyards. Nine railcars were destroyed by terrorists at Kifissia station on 2009-03-02.	
11th	2000–2004	DM-T-DM+DM-T-DM	T	3201–3240	120 railcars coupled in 20 EMU-6 trains. Made by ADtranz-Siemens-Hellenic Shipyards. Nine railcars were destroyed by terrorists at Kifissia station on 2009-03-02.	

=== Other rolling stock ===
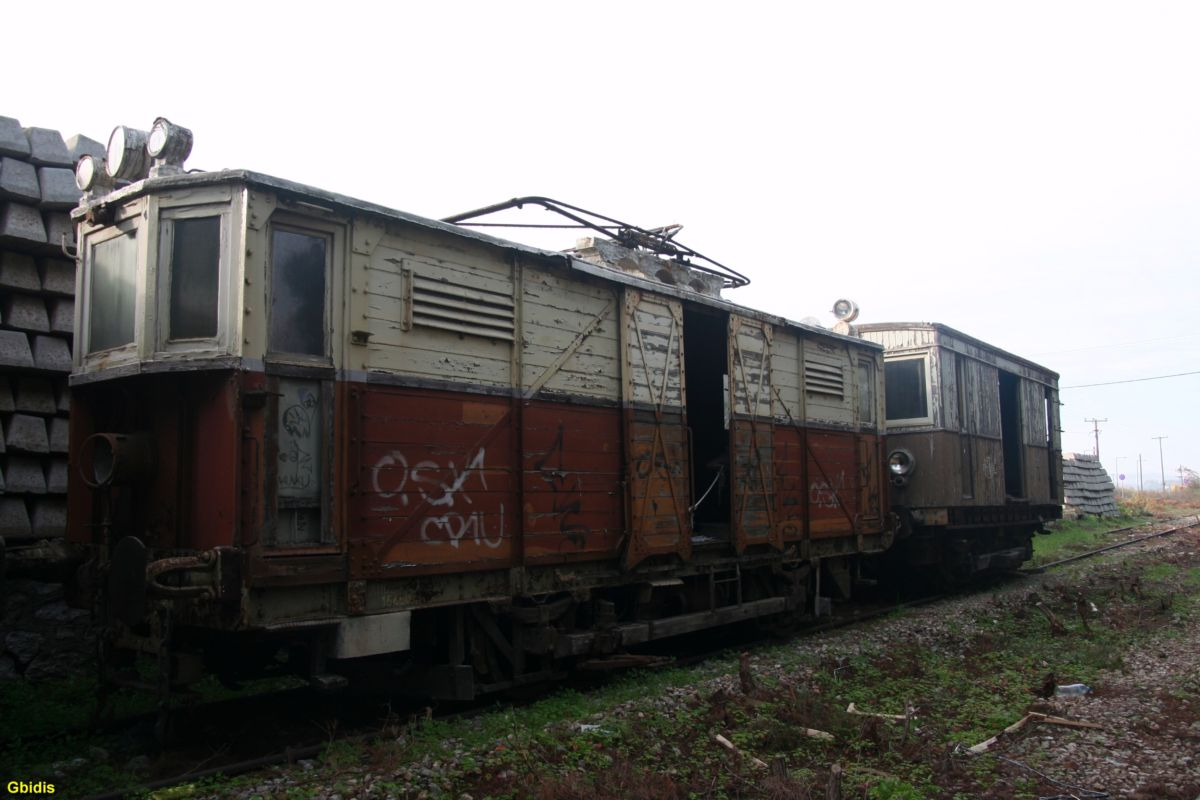
Freight railcar 41

During 1981-1984 ISAP leased six four-car, bright yellow trains of narrow loading gauge (type G-I or Gisela) from East Berlin's U-Bahn.

In the early 1980s consideration was given to the purchase of 60 secondhand cars of London Underground R Stock, built between 1938 and 1959, but ultimately no deal was made and new carriages were purchased instead.

== Gallery ==
Piraeus station, a historical sample of early 20th century industrial architecture

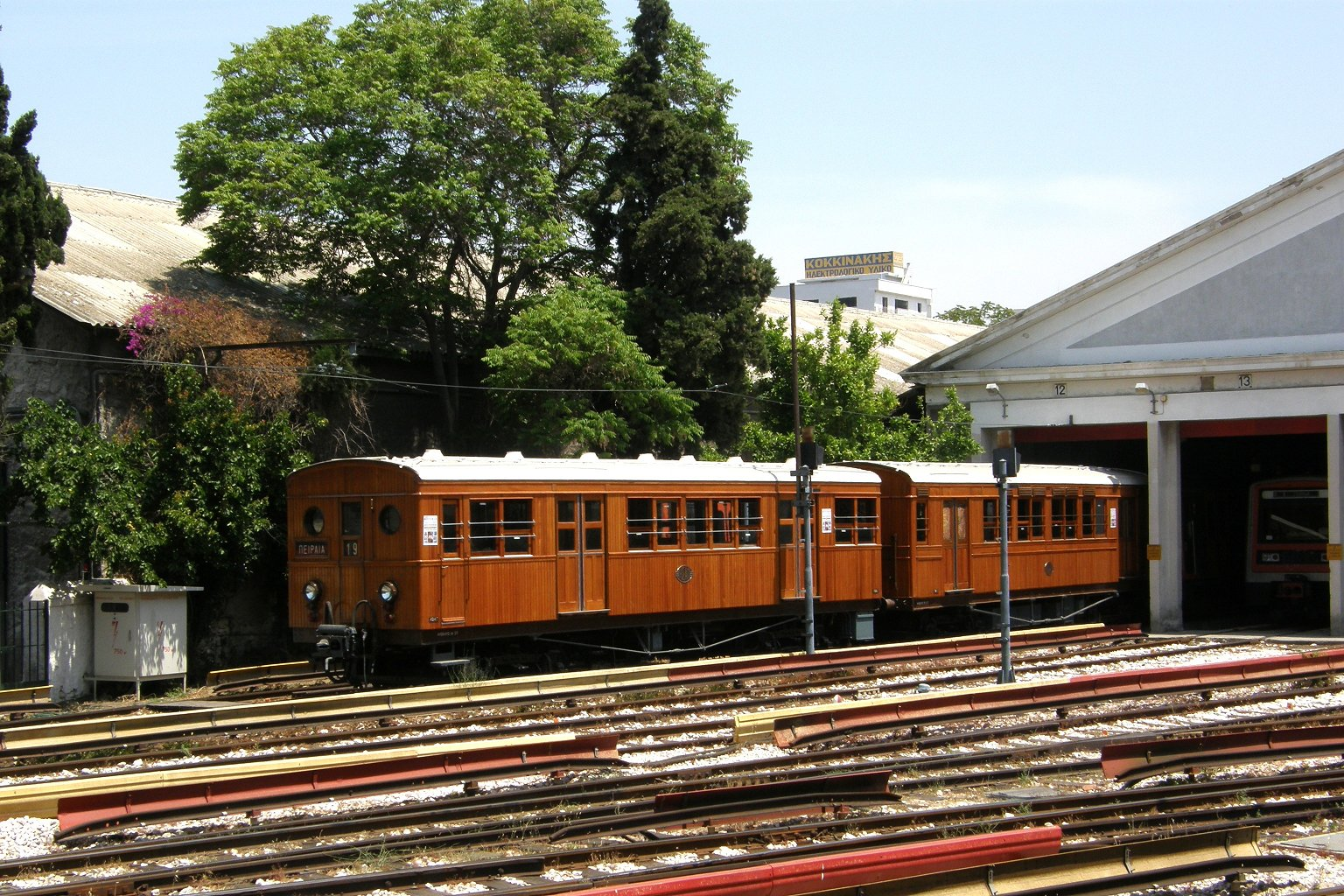
Preserved old EIS rolling stock at Piraeus Depot.

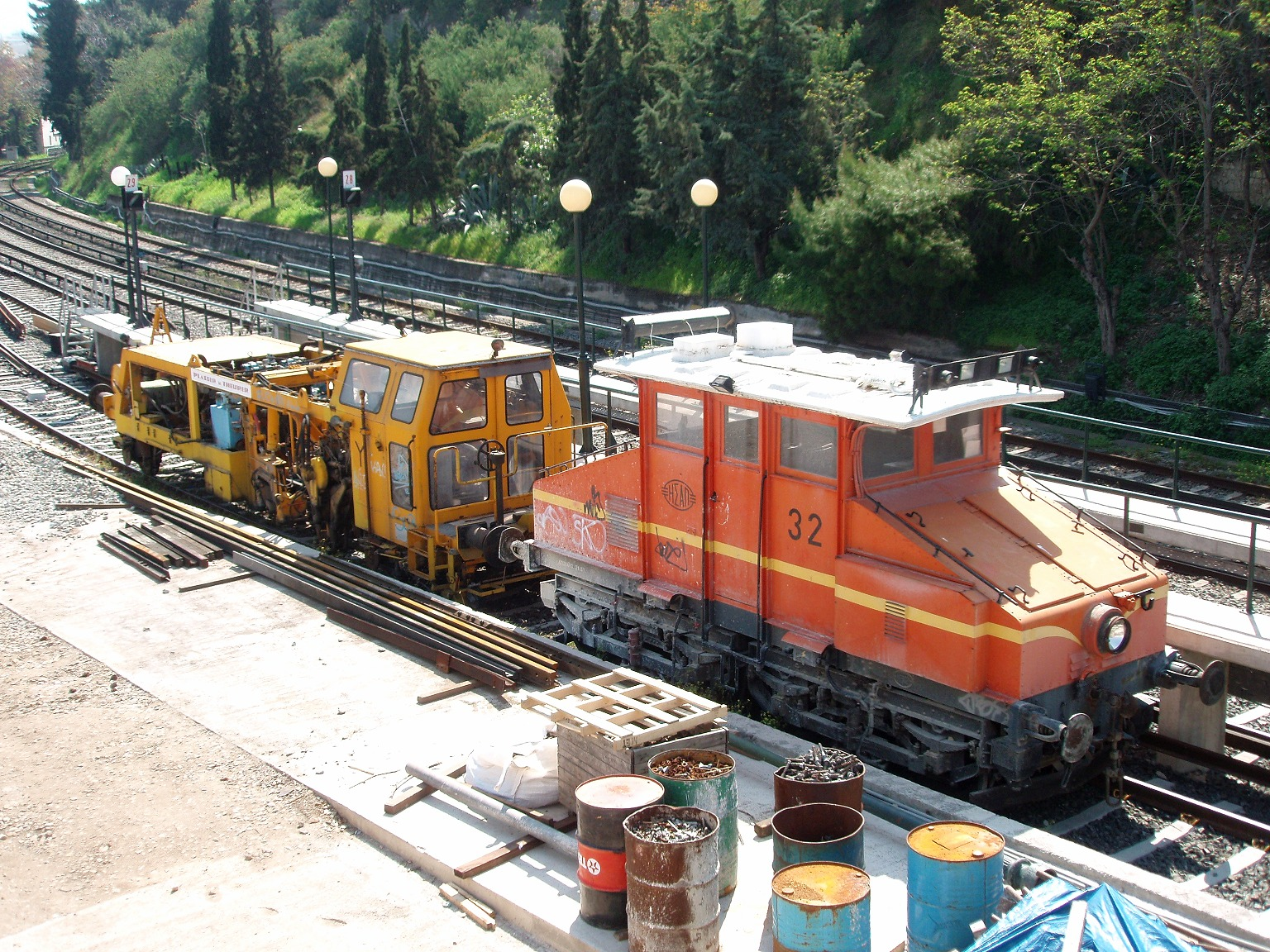
Preserved electric locomotive no 32 and ballast tamper Y at Thision station sidings.

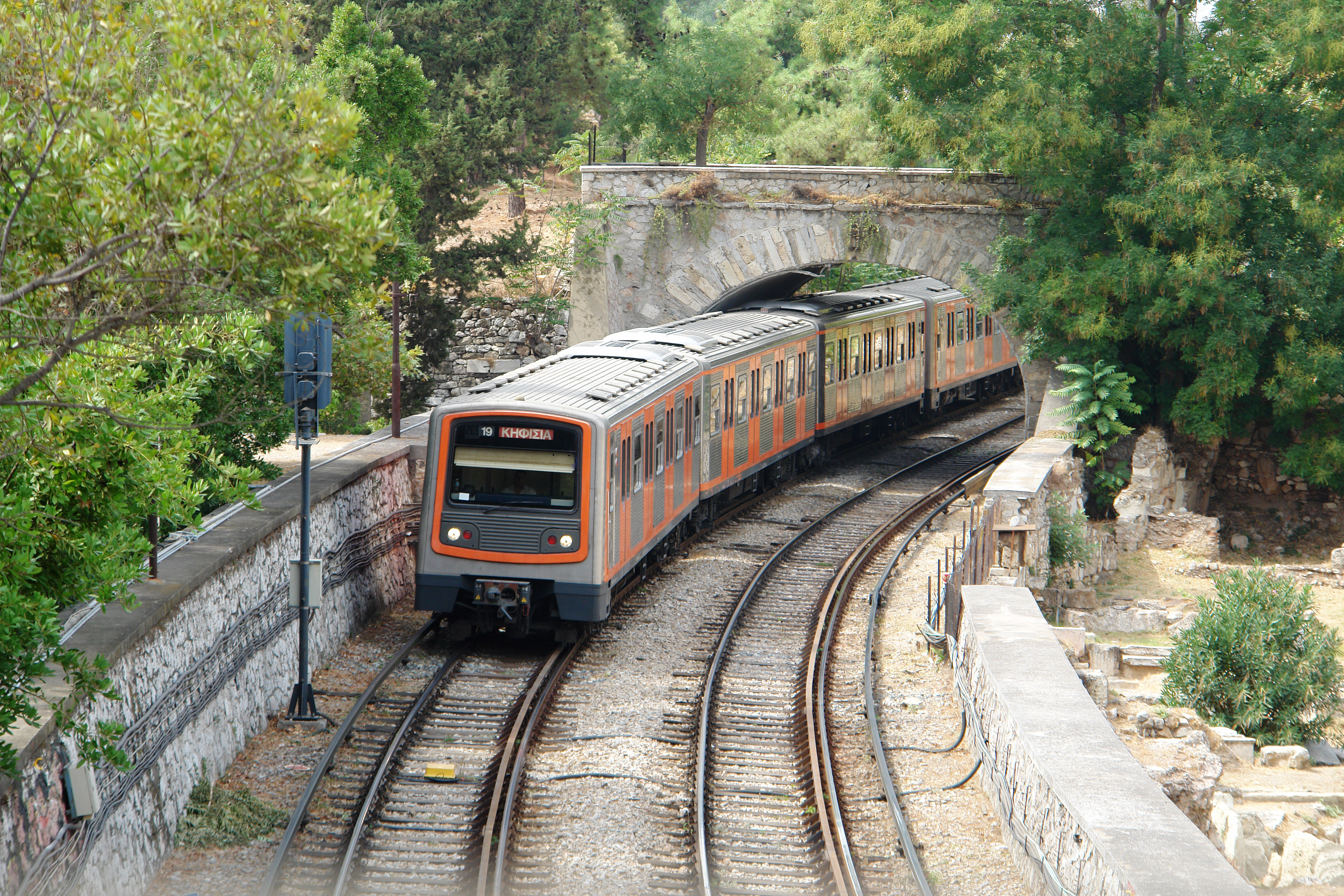
ISAP train at the Ancient Agora of Athens.

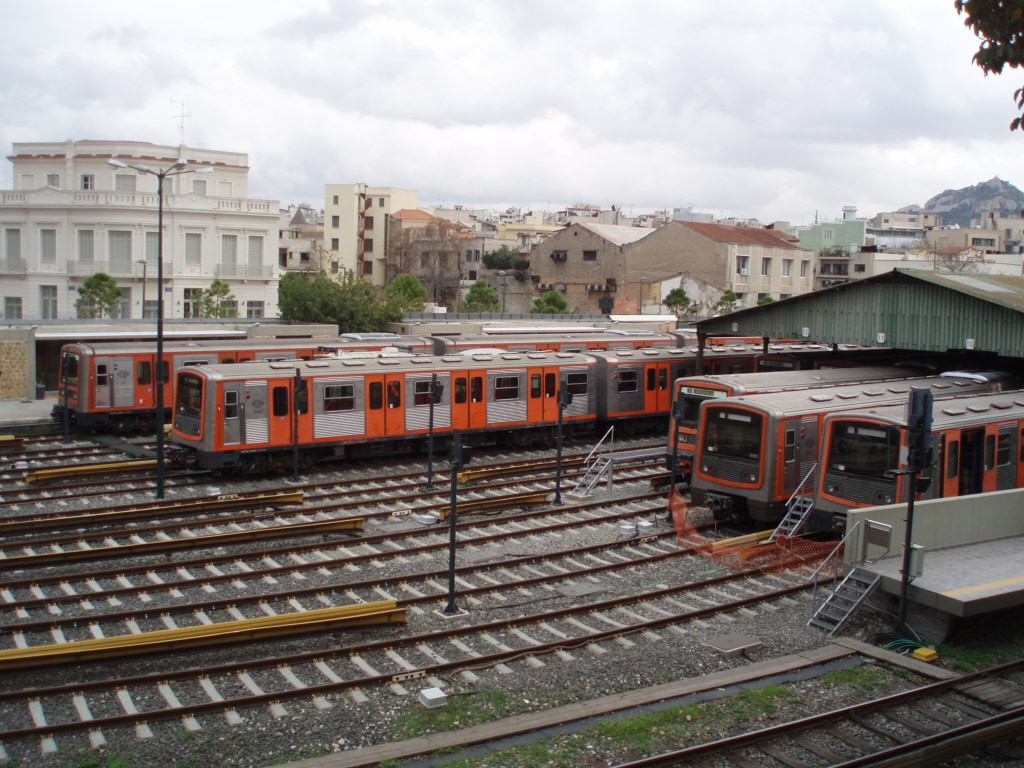
ISAP trainsets at Thissio depot

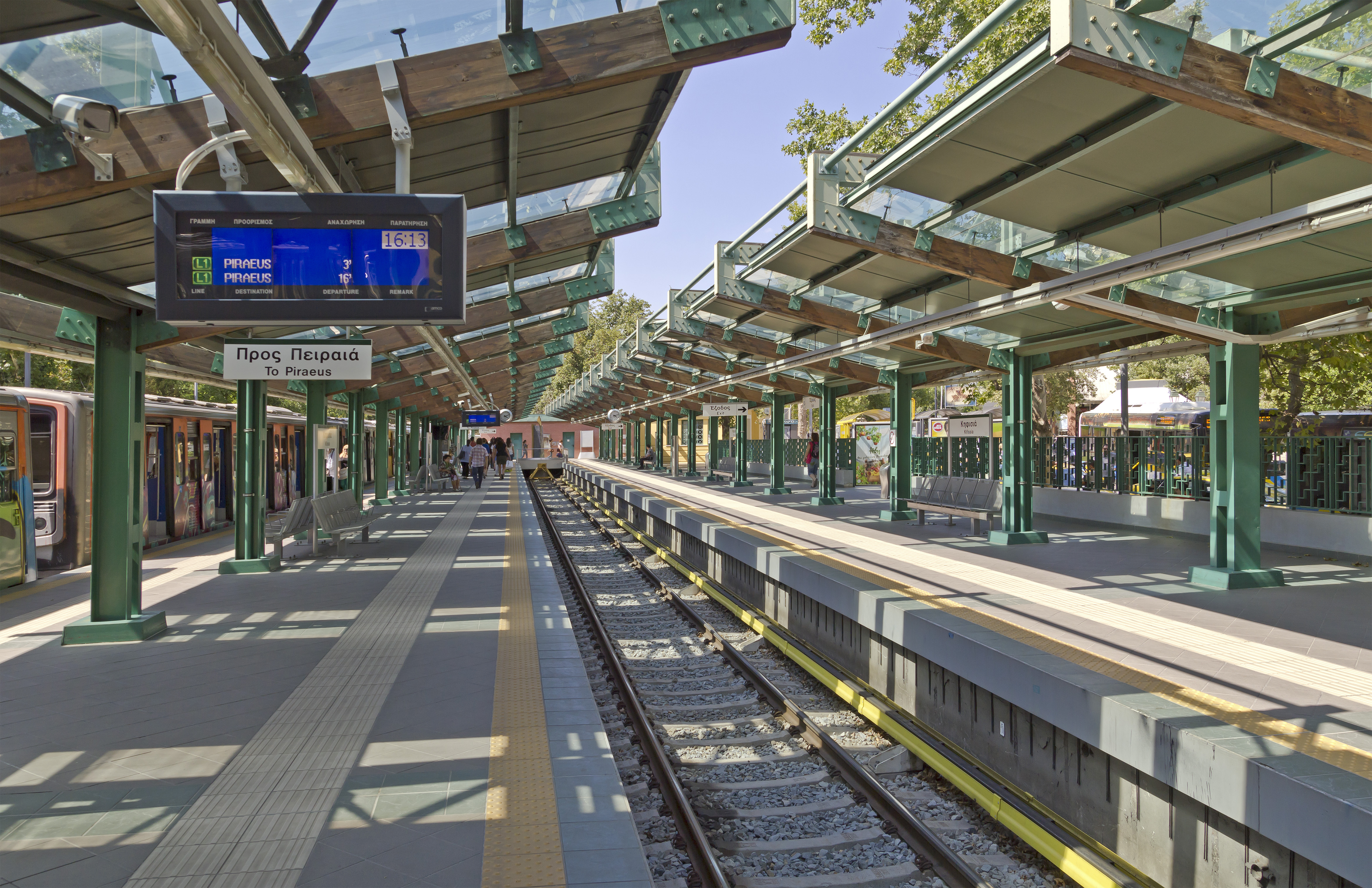
Kifissia Station the northernmost terminus

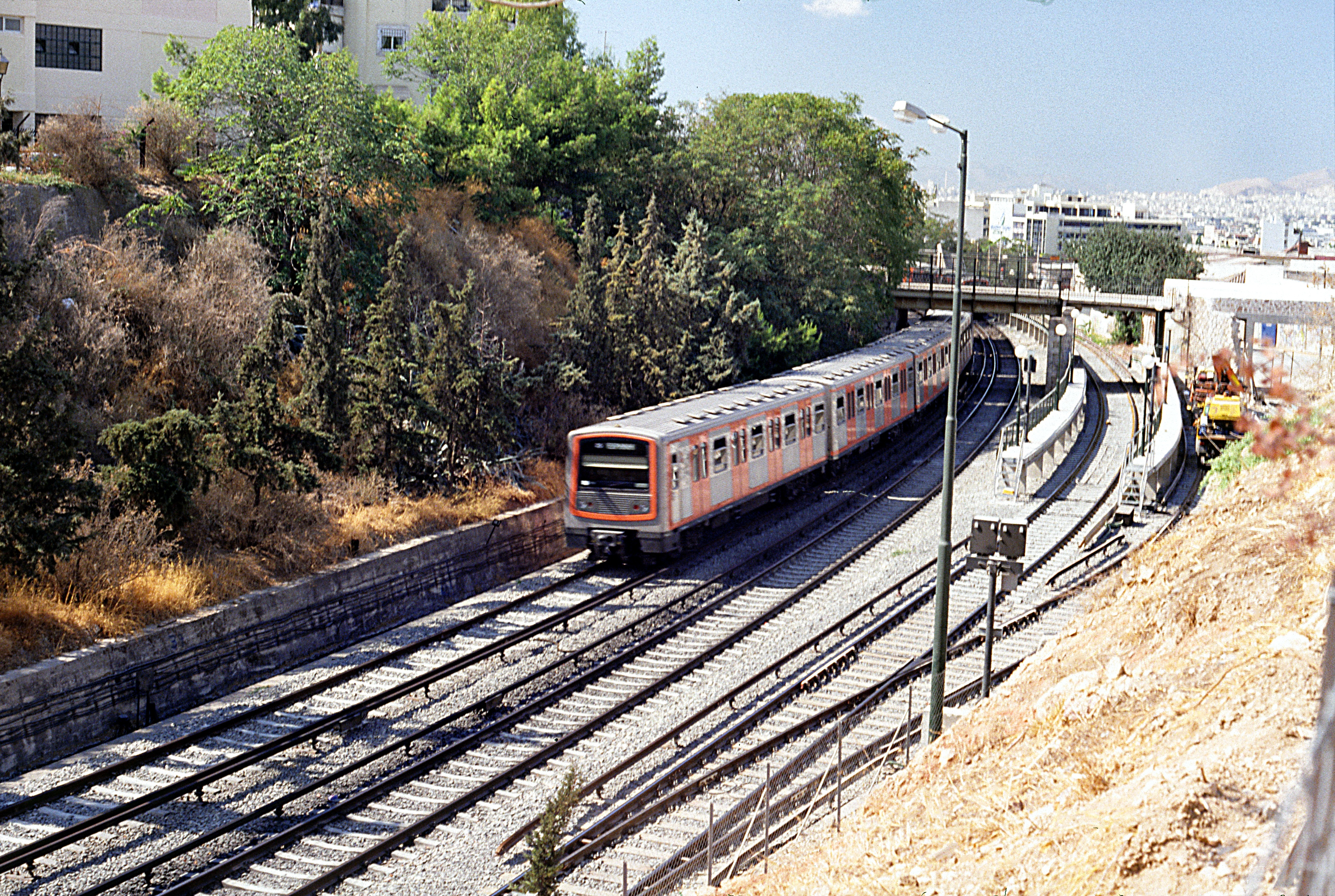
11th batch trainset near Thissio station

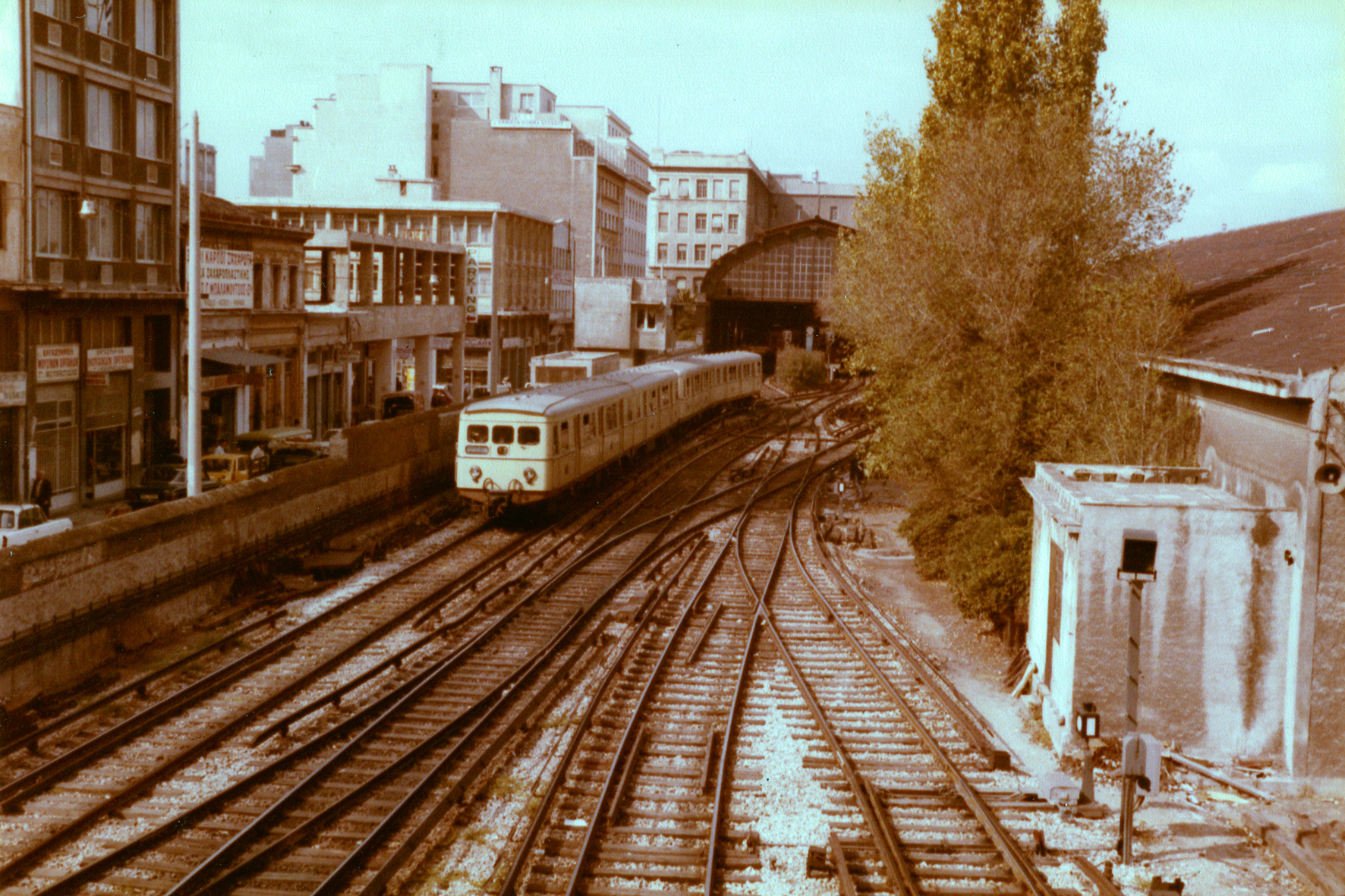
7th batch trainset at Piraeus station in 1979

== See also ==
- Piraeus-Perama light railway
- Lavrion Square-Strofyli railway
- Attica Railways
- Transport for Athens (OASA)
- Athens Metro
- Line 1 (Athens Metro)
- Budapest–Belgrade–Skopje–Athens railway
