= Agia Sophia Stadium =

Stadium in Nea Filadelfeia, Greece

Allwyn Arena
- Agia Sophia; Αγιά Σοφιά (Greek)
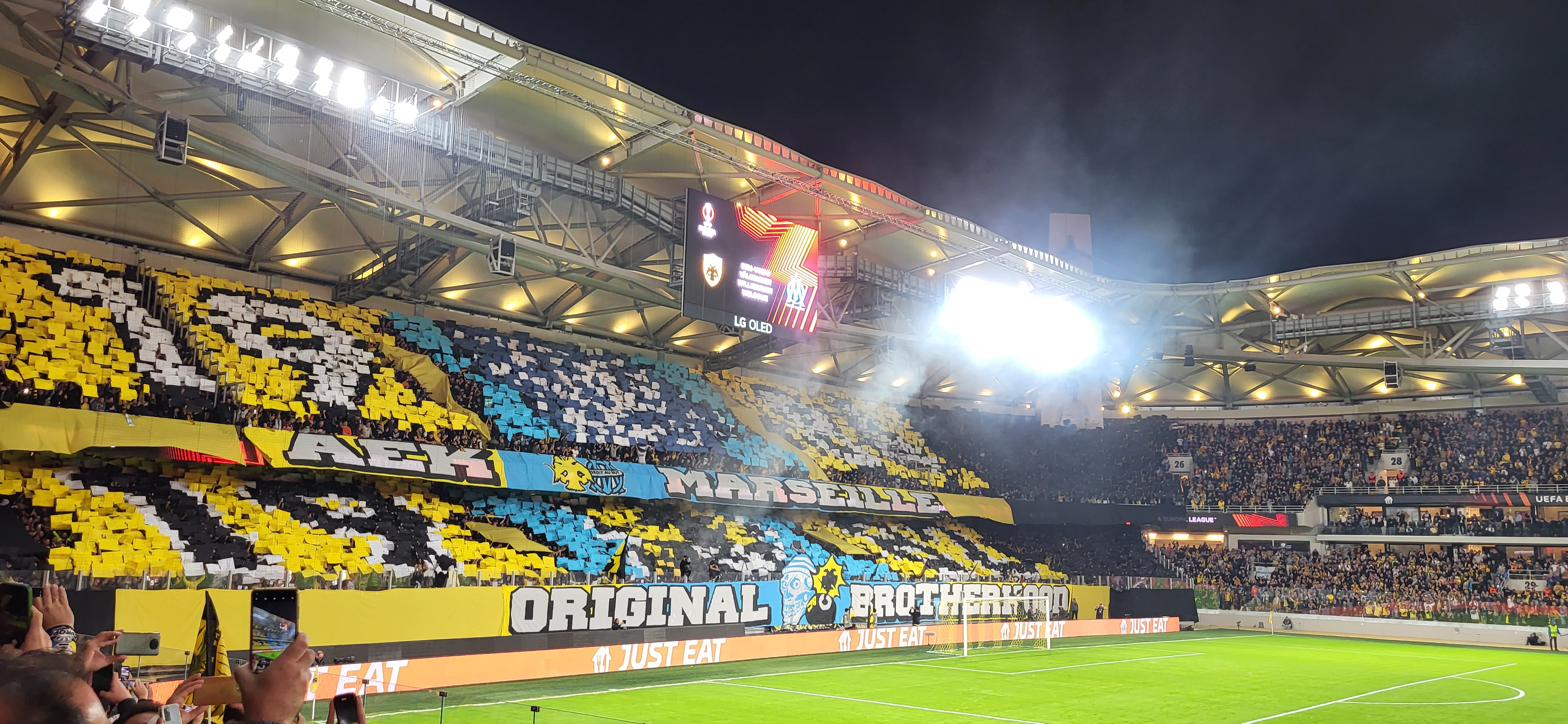
- UEFA
- Interactive map of Allwyn Arena
- Full name: Centre of Sports, Remembrance and Culture Agia Sophia
- Former names: OPAP Arena (2022–2026)
- Address: Fokon 11, 14341
- Location: Nea Filadelfeia, Athens, Greece
- Owner: AEK Athens F.C.
- Operator: Dikefalos Aetos S.A.
- Capacity: 31,100
- Executive suites: 40
- Surface: Natural grass
- Scoreboard: 2x OLED
- Record attendance: 31,100 (Note: 2022–23 Super League Greece: AEK Athens vs Ionikos AEK Athens vs PAOK AEK Athens vs Panathinaikos AEK Athens vs Olympiacos AEK Athens vs Olympiacos AEK Athens vs Volos, 2023–24 Super League Greece: AEK Athens vs Olympiacos AEK Athens vs Panathinaikos AEK Athens vs Lamia, 2025–26 Super League Greece: AEK Athens vs Olympiacos AEK Athens vs PAOK AEK Athens vs Panathinaikos AEK Athens vs Olympiacos 2025–26 UEFA Conference League: AEK Athens vs Rayo Vallecano)
- Field size: 105 m × 68 m (344 ft × 223 ft)
- Public transit: at Perissos
- Parking: 1,200 (surface); 400–500 (underground)

Construction
- Groundbreaking: 28 July 2017
- Built: September 2022
- Opened: 30 September 2022
- Years active: 4 years, 1 month
- Cost: € 98,700,000
- Architect: Athanassios Kyratsous
- Project manager: Dimitris Andriopoulos
- General contractor: Ermonassa S.A.

Tenants
- AEK Athens (2022–present); Greece national football team (2023–2024)

Website
- allwynarena.gr

Agia Sophia Stadium (pronounced [aˈʝa soˈfça]), also known as Allwyn Arena for sponsorship reasons and as AEK Arena for UEFA competitions, is the home stadium of AEK Athens. With an all-seater capacity of 32,500 it is the third largest football stadium overall in Greece. It is located in Nea Filadelfeia, a northwestern suburb of Athens, Greece. The stadium is built on the same site of the former Nikos Goumas Stadium. The construction of the Agia Sophia Stadium was completed in October 2022. It is the newest stadium built in Greece.

The stadium hosted the 2024 UEFA Europa Conference League final on 29 May 2024.

== Name ==
The original name of the stadium, Agia Sophia, named after the Byzantine-built former Orthodox cathedral Hagia Sophia, was picked in order to commemorate the roots of the club from the city of Constantinople (present day Istanbul). The commercial name of the stadium, OPAP Arena, was picked after OPAP – Greek Organisation of Football Prognostics S.A. secured the naming rights for five years, starting from 2022 onwards. In early 2026, after OPAP rebranded to Allwyn, the stadium’s commercial name was accordingly changed to Allwyn Arena. As UEFA does not allow for stadiums to be named after a sponsor, AEK Arena is used for the European governing body's competitions.

== History ==
In 1926, land in Nea Filadelfeia that was originally set aside for refugee housing was donated as a training ground for the Greek refugees. A stadium was built at the site in 1930, named "Nikos Goumas", and became the home ground of AEK Athens FC.

In 2003, Giannis Granitsas, president of AEK at the time, advocated for demolishing the stadium at the interest of erecting a new one at the same location, citing that the stadium was seriously damaged from the 1999 Athens earthquake. His plan was to build a new stadium at the same site, which would include also a basketball indoor hall and a mall. The goal was for the stadium to be ready in time for the 2004 Summer Olympics.

However, shortly before the construction of the new stadium was to commence, it was halted by the Council of State, which decided that the construction plans of the stadium were contrary to the Constitution of Greece.

In 2005, Dimitris Melissanidis was a candidate for the presidency of AEK, and presented a plan for the construction of a stadium at the area of Nikos Goumas, bearing the name Agia Sophia. However, he lost the elections.

In 2007, AEK Athens FC's president Demis Nikolaidis was developing a project to build a 50,000-capacity stadium at Ano Liosia. The plan was canceled due to a lack of fan support and lack of funds.

After the bankruptcy and relegation of AEK Athens FC in 2013, Dimitris Melissanidis took up the reorganization of the club and re-introduced the plan of Hagia Sophia in a press conference held on 10 July 2013.

The first presentation of the stadium took place on 2 October 2013 in the Miltos Kountouras hall at the Nea Filadelfeia High School. The project manager of the stadium Dimitris Andriopoulos announced the first features and facilities. The stadium will fulfill the criteria to be a four-category in the UEFA stadium categories, it will have a capacity of 32,500 and will have 40 suites. There will be a museum about the Greek refugees who left from Asia Minor in 1922. It will offer 1,500–2,000 jobs during its construction and 250,400 permanent jobs when it was constructed. The stadium's construction was expected to begin in 2014 and finish by 2015. The first images of the stadium were also exposed. The stadium is designed after the Walls of Constantinople where the club originated from, and it will resemble a castle from the outside.

The grand presentation of the stadium took place on 6 November 2013 at the Onassis Cultural Center in Athens, which will contribute financially to the construction of the stadium. A symbolic fund was also donated by the Ecumenical Patriarchate of Constantinople. Technical information about the stadium was presented and its facilities were illustrated in a 20-minute video.

On 2 January 2015, the municipality of Filadelfeia-Chalkidona filed a complaint at the Council of State against the decision of the Forests Directorate of the Attica Decentralized Administration calling for the redevelopment of 0.6 hectares from the Grove of Nea Filadelfeia in accordance with the overall plans for the new stadium. Additionally, 17 citizens of the municipality of Filadelfeia-Chalkidona filed a complaint on 1 December 2014 about the same matter.

The case was heard at the Council of State on 6 March 2015. The decision was issued on 5 June 2015, and it rejected the claims of the municipality and the citizens as unsubstantive and obscure.

The plan for the building of the stadium was released for public consultation by the Ministry of Productive Reconstruction, Environment and Energy on 22 July. The process would be completed in 45 days. The municipality of Filadelfeia-Chalkidona filed an application for an extension of the public consultation for an extra 45 days, which was accepted. The consultation was finally concluded on 24 November 2015.

On 28 January 2016, the meeting of the Administrative Regiοn of Attica approved the Study of the Environmental Impact of the project.

The minister of Environment and Energy, Panos Skourletis, signed the Study of the Environmental impact of the stadium on 31 March 2016.

The planning permission was acquired from the Ministry of Environment on 25 July 2017.

== Funding ==
The net construction cost is estimated at € 81,700,000. The funding will be completed in three stages. The first phase of construction will cost € 25,000,000; the second phase € 20,000,000 and the third € 14,700,000. The Administrative region of Attica will fund the stadium with € 20,000,000. The sum left will be funded by Dikefalos 1924, a company that was founded for the construction of the stadium.

== Construction ==
The construction of the stadium began with earthworks on 28 July 2017. The first phase of construction consisted of excavations and retaining works, which according to the initial planning would last for 5 months. Eventually, the first phase was completed on 5 December 2017.

On 6 February 2018, it was announced that the company «ERMONASSA SA» would undertake the completion of the second phase regarding the construction of the stadium. These include, according to the official announcement, the remaining earthworks, the reinforced concrete main structure of the stadium, the construction of the concrete reinforced and prestressed pillars, and finally the construction and installation of the stands. The completion of this phase is planned to last 14 months. The works began on 12 February 2018. The third and final phase started on 30 March 2020 and was completed in early September 2022.

== Facilities ==
Agia Sophia Stadium offers the following facilities, amenities, and attractions.

- A small church of Hosios Loukas, in honour of AEK Athens FC former president Loukas Barlos
- Double dressing rooms for tournaments
- 32,500 capacity (31,100 seated)
- Conference room
- VIP Entrance
- VIP Area
- VVIP Members Club
- Cigar Lounge
- 40 suites
- Executive suite
- AEK Boutique
- AEK Athens FC History Museum
- Museum of Greek Refugees
- OPAP betting shop
- Panoramic view restaurant
- Traditional coffee shop
- Traditional shoe shop & locksmith
- Double-headed eagle statue (stadium main entrance)
- AEK Offices

== Transport connections ==
The stadium is accessible from the Athens Metro Line 1 with the closest stations to Agia Sophia Stadium are Perissos and Pefkakia. All are 600 to 900 metres (10–15 minutes) from the stadium. Agia Sophia Stadium is also served by several Bus and Trolleybus routes.

These are:

- Trolleybus: Line 6 (Pindou stop) and Line 3 (N.Filadelfeia stop - end of line)
- Bus Lines: 619, Β9 (both lines Trochonomos stop), 755, 755Β (both lines Pindou stop), 421 (AEK Stadium stop), and Α8 (near Metro Station Perissos & Metro Station Pefkakia)

There are also a few bus lines further away that serve the stadium: 605 (1st Perissou stop, 900 meters, approx 13 minutes), 602 (Trochonomos stop, 1 km away, 15 minutes), 024 (Vrioulon stop, 1 km) and 604 (1st El. Venizelos stop, 1.2 km)

The stadium is also expected to be served by the New Filadelfia metro station line 4. The station will be located in the Asia Minor and Forgotten Homelands Memorial Park Nea Filadelfeia and will be delivered in the fourth phase of the line's completion, expected around the end of the 2030s.

== Opening ceremony and matches ==
The stadium's opening ceremony took place on 30 September 2022.

AEK Athens beat Ionikos 4–1 in their new stadium's opening match on 3 October 2022, a match conducted for the sixth fixture of the 2022–23 Super League.

Date	Attendance	Score	Competition	Opponent
3 October 2022	31,100	4–1	Super League	Ionikos

On 7 March 2023, the Hellenic Football Federation committee announced Agia Sophia stadium as the home ground of Greece for the UEFA Euro 2024 qualifying round. However, Greece played its first international game in Agia Sophia stadium earlier that year against Lithuania.

Date	Attendance	Score	Competition	Opponent
27 March 2023	15,000	0–0	Exhibition Game	Lithuania

== Greece national football team matches ==
Win Loss Draw

Nr	Competition	Date	Opponent	Result	Attendance	Scorers for Greece	Ref.
1	Friendly	27 March 2023	Lithuania	0–0	15,000		
2	UEFA Euro Qualifiers	16 June 2023	Republic of Ireland	2–1	18,079	Anastasios Bakasetas, Georgios Masouras	
3	UEFA Euro Qualifiers	10 September 2023	Gibraltar	5–0	11,237	Dimitrios Pelkas, Konstantinos Mavropanos, Georgios Masouras	
4	UEFA Euro Qualifiers	16 October 2023	Netherlands	0–1	27,000		
5	UEFA Euro Qualifiers	21 November 2023	France	2–2	24,820	Anastasios Bakasetas, Fotis Ioannidis	
6	UEFA Euro Qualifiers	21 March 2024	Kazakhstan	5–0	25,200	Dimitrios Kourbelis, Anastasios Bakasetas, Fotis Ioannidis, Dimitrios Pelkas	

== UEFA competition finals ==
Key
†	Match won after extra time

List of UEFA Europa Conference League finals
Season	Country	Winners	Score	Runners-up	Country	Venue	Attendance	Ref
2023–24	Greece	Olympiacos	1–0^{†} (Note: The score was 0–0 after 90 minutes.)	Fiorentina	Italy	Agia Sophia Stadium, Athens, Greece	26,842	

== Record ==
=== AEK Athens ===
Team	Competition	Matches	Wins	Draws	Losses	GF	GA	GD
AEK Athens	Super League Greece	71	54	11	6	161	37	+124
AEK Athens	Greek Cup	12	10	1	1	27	3	+25
AEK Athens	UEFA	18	10	3	5	35	21	+14
AEK Athens	Total	101	74	15	12	223	61	+162

Last updated: 9 November 2026.
Source: aekfc.gr

=== AEK Athens WFC ===
Team	Competition	Matches	Wins	Draws	Losses	GF	GA	GD
AEK Athens WFC	Greek A Division	1	0	1	0	4	4	0
AEK Athens WFC	Greek Women's Cup	0	0	0	0	0	0	0
AEK Athens WFC	UEFA	0	0	0	0	0	0	0
AEK Athens WFC	Total	1	0	1	0	4	4	0

Last updated: 10 May 2025.
Source: aek.gr

=== Greece national football team ===
Team	Competition	Matches	Wins	Draws	Losses	GF	GA	GD
Greece	FIFA World Cup Qualifiers	0	0	0	0	0	0	0
Greece	UEFA Euro Qualifiers	5	3	1	1	14	4	+10
Greece	UEFA Nations League	0	0	0	0	0	0	0
Greece	Exhibition Games	1	0	1	0	0	0	0
Greece	Total	6	3	2	1	14	4	+10

Last updated: 21 November 2023.
Source: epo.gr

== See also ==
- Nikos Goumas Stadium
