= ISAP metallic trainsets =

ISAP metallic transet (5th, 6th and 7th batch)
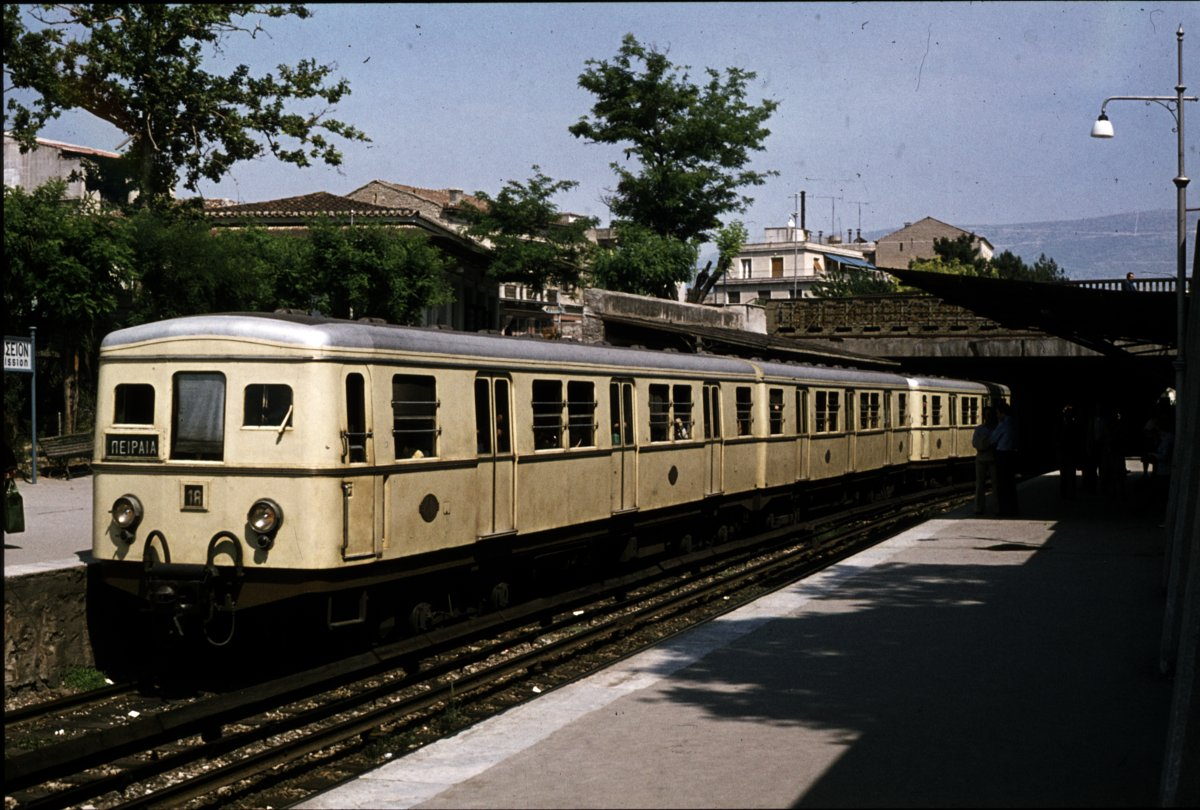
- 5th batch trainset at Thiseion (1978)
- Stock type: Electric multiple unit
- Manufacturers: SSW, Siemens, EIS
- Entered service: 1951
- Number built: 74 cars (37 2-car sets)
- Formation: 2-car sets
- Operators: Hellenic Electric Railways (1951-1976); Athens-Piraeus Electric Railways (1976-????)

Specifications
- Car body construction: Steel
- Car length: 17.0 m (55 ft 9 1/4 in)
- Height: 3.6 m (11 ft 9 3/4 in)
- Wheel diameter: 860 mm (2 ft 9 7/8 in)
- Maximum speed: 80 km/h (50 mph)
- Weight: 5th: 67.8 tonnes (66.7 long tons; 74.7 short tons); 6th/7th: 63.0 tonnes (62.0 long tons; 69.4 short tons)
- Acceleration: 0.8 m/s^{2} (2.6 ft/s^{2})
- Deceleration: 0.7 m/s^{2} (2.3 ft/s^{2})
- Current collection: Third rail
- Multiple working: Up to 3 trainsets
- Track gauge: 1,435 mm (4 ft 8 1/2 in)

The Metallic trainsets were three batches (5th, 6th and 7th) of two-car electric multiple units (EMU), which used to be part of Athens-Piraeus Electric Railways (ISAP). They were built by SSW, MAN and Siemens on which they were put into service in 1976, when it was founded. They could fit up to 318 (112 seated 236 and standing passengers, couple with a baggage coach) or 353 (208 seated and 247 standing, couple without a baggage coach) passengers, engine either SSW DT 861 D with Kw 95/60 ΜΙΝ power (5th batch) or SSW GB 230/14 A with Kw 120/60min power (6th and 7th batch) and windows either the same height (6th and 7th batch) or the two side windows being smaller than the middle one (5th batch), but always with the same speed. They can be coupled up to 3 trainsets.

In total 74 coaches were produced, consisting by two 37 two-coached trainsets.

== History ==
Prior to the 1950s, at Ilektrikos' line, the wooden trainsets of, 2nd, 3rd and 4th batches were circulating. Although they were of the bests, they were considered obsolete, so new trainsets had to be purchased. On the other side, many trainsets were destroyed due to World War II. EIS ordered from MAN and SSW, these new trains, based on the 1930 Berlin Metro. The delivery consisted of 12 trainsets, to replenish the war's destroyed trains. The delivery began in 1951 and concluded one year later.

With the extension to Kifissia, it was decided to order 16 more units, this time from MAN and Siemens Hellas. The new trainsets had new engines with larger power and, instead of a large middle front window, three same lsmaller. The deliver started in 1958 and concluded one year later. The final supply, of 9 units, was due to cover the more and more traffic. This time, MAN and the EIS' factory in Piraeus were co-operated. These trains, were identical to the 6th batch ones, but with the molding to protrude on the head-ons and without horizontal metallic bars on the side windows

With the delivery of the new 8th, 9th, and 10th batch trainsets, they were painted from yellow to silver with orange stripes.
