= Agios Eleftherios metro station =

Athens Metro station

Άγιος Ελευθέριος Aghios Eleftherios
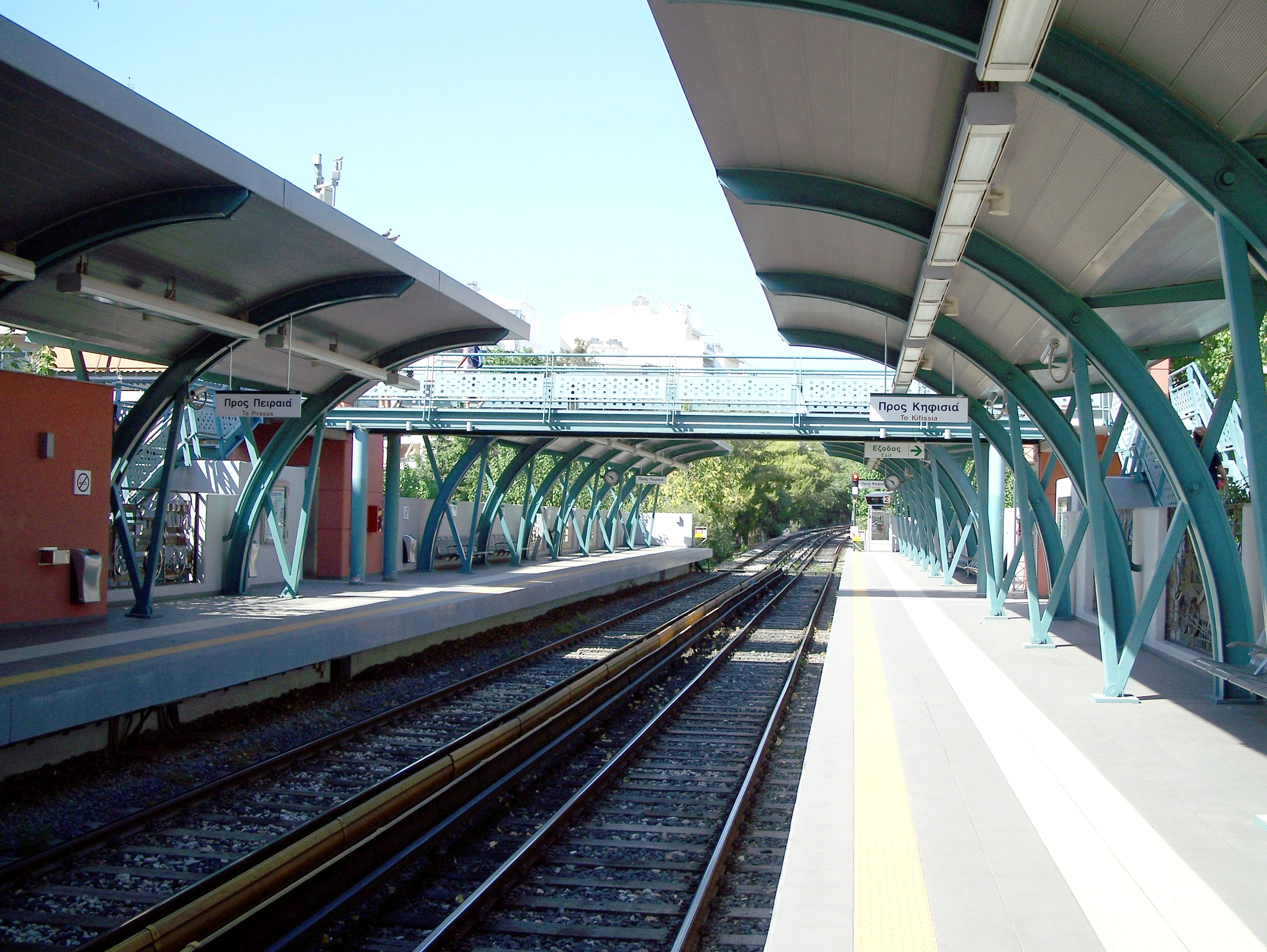

General information
- Location: Athens; Greece
- Coordinates: 38.019805°N 23.731630°E
- Manager: STASY
- Line: Athens Metro Line 1
- Platforms: 2
- Tracks: 2

Construction
- Structure type: At-grade
- Accessible: Yes

Key dates
- 12 February 1956: Line opened
- 4 August 1961: Station opened
- December 2001: Station rebuilt

Services
| Preceding station | Athens Metro | Following station |
|---|---|---|
| Kato Patisia towards Piraeus | Line 1 | Ano Patisia towards Kifissia |
Location

Agios Eleftherios (Greek: Άγιος Ελευθέριος), also known as Aghios Eleftherios on signage, is a metro station on Athens Metro Line 1 in the Athenian suburb of Patisia. It was opened by the Hellenic Electric Railways on 4 August 1961, and is 14.668 kilometres (9.114 mi) from Piraeus.

== Station Layout ==
L1
Footbridge
Overpass between platforms
G
Side platform
Southbound
← towards Piraeus (Kato Patisia)
Northbound
towards Kifissia (Ano Patisia) →
Side platform
- Customer service
- Tickets
- Entry/Exit
