= Scuola Italiana Statale di Atene =

Location
- Mitsaki, 18 11141 Atene; Athens; Greece
- Coordinates: 38.0176216°N 23.73784009999997°E

Information
- Type: Italian international school
- Website: scuolaitaliana.gr

Scuola Italiana Statale di Atene (Greek: Ιταλική Σχολή Αθηνών) is an Italian international school in Ano Patissia in Athens, Greece. Owned by the Italian government, it serves elementary, lower secondary, and liceo (upper secondary) levels.

== History ==
It was officially established in 1956. No later than 1968, was it run as a two-fold school, namely an Italian and a Greek one. In 1968, the two sections were merged and the pupils were educated accordingly to both the Italian and Greek instructional systems. As a result, they were entitled to hold exams either for the Greek "Apolytirion" and the Italian "Maturità". Until 1972 the headquarters of the School were to be found in the "Casa d'Italia" magnificent building (47, Patission Street). In 1972, however, they were transferred to a Vatican-owned building, former seminar of Roman Catholic clergymen, at Greek capital's fringes (18, Mitsaki Street, Ano Patissia). In 1974, moreover, two separate sections, that is to say an Italian and a Greek one, were re-established and, at last, in 2015 the Greek section was closed down.

== Teachers and students ==
As of 2015 the school has 27 teachers and 218 students. Most students come from mixed Italian-Greek families. A larger minority are students of nationalities other than Greek or Italian, mostly Albanian students. A smaller minority are Italians temporarily residing in Greece. Another small group are Greek students who had previously lived in Italy and attended local schools there. Teachers include contract teachers, supplemental teachers, and those sent by the Italian Ministry of Foreign Affairs (MAE).
