= Kato Patisia metro station =

Athens Metro station

Κάτω Πατήσια Kato Patissia
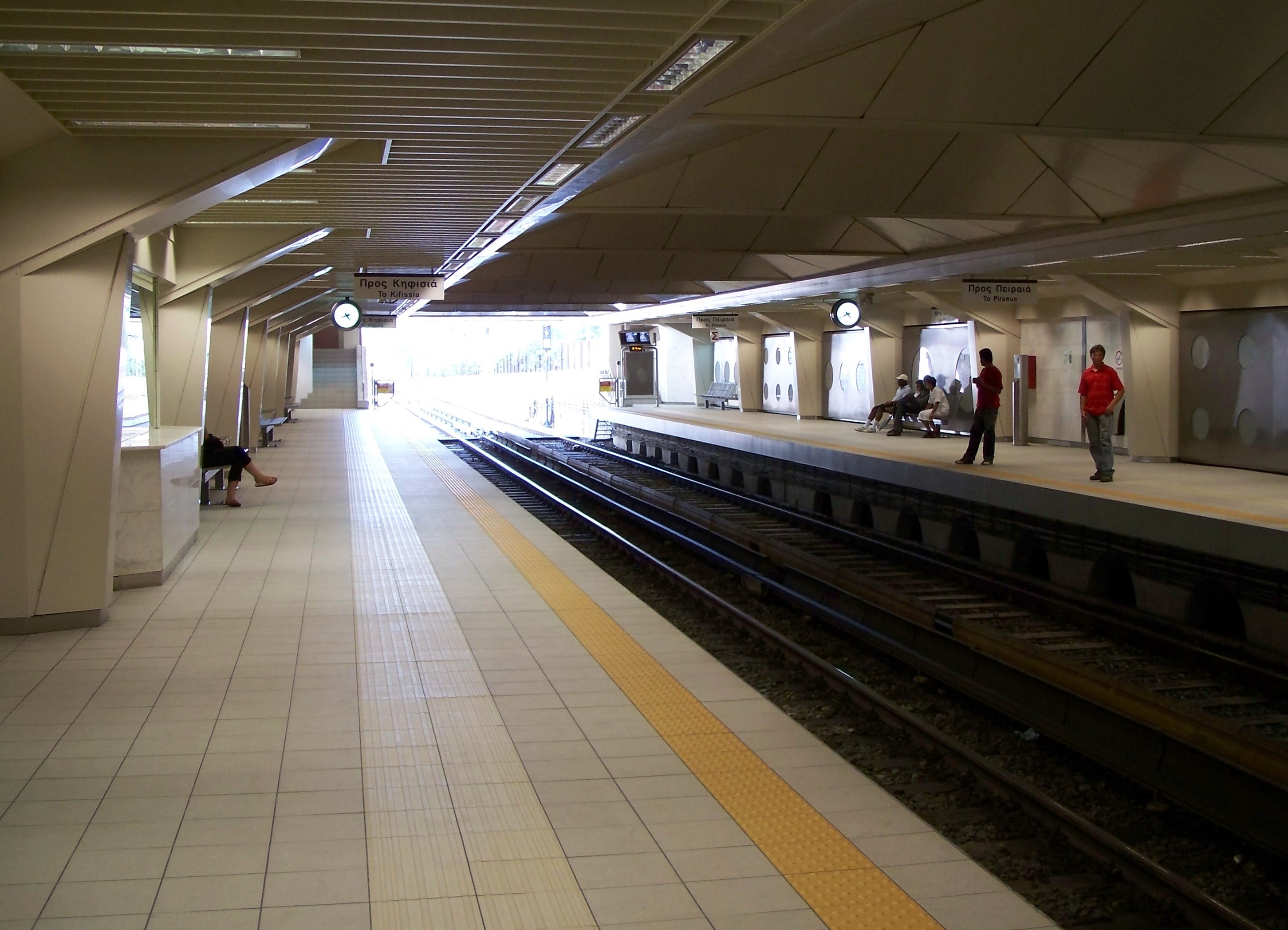
- Station platforms

General information
- Location: Athens; Greece
- Coordinates: 38.011505°N 23.728560°E
- Manager: STASY
- Line: Athens Metro Line 1
- Platforms: 2
- Tracks: 2

Construction
- Structure type: Sub-surface underground
- Accessible: Yes

Key dates
- 12 February 1956: Opened
- 22 July 2004: Rebuilt

Services
Preceding station	Athens Metro	Following station
Agios Nikolaos towards Piraeus	Line 1	Agios Eleftherios towards Kifissia
Former services
Preceding station	Former railways	Following station
Attiki towards Lavrion Square	Lavrion Square–Strofyli Railway	Ano Patisia towards Strofyli
Attiki towards Lavrion Square	Athens–Lavrion Railway	Ano Patisia towards Kalogreza or Lavrion
Location

Kato Patisia (Greek: Κάτω Πατήσια), also known as Kato Patissia on signage, is on Athens Metro Line 1 in Patisia. It opened by the Hellenic Electric Railways on 12 February 1956, and is 13.722 kilometres (8.526 mi) from Piraeus.

== Station Layout ==
G
Street level
- Entry/Exit
- Plateia Spanoudi
B1
- Customer service
- Tickets
Side platform
Southbound
← towards Piraeus (Agios Nikolaos)
Northbound
towards Kifissia (Agios Eleftherios) →
Side platform
