= Tavros – Eleftherios Venizelos metro station =

Athens Metro station

Ταύρος - Ελ. Βενιζέλος Tavros – El. Venizelos
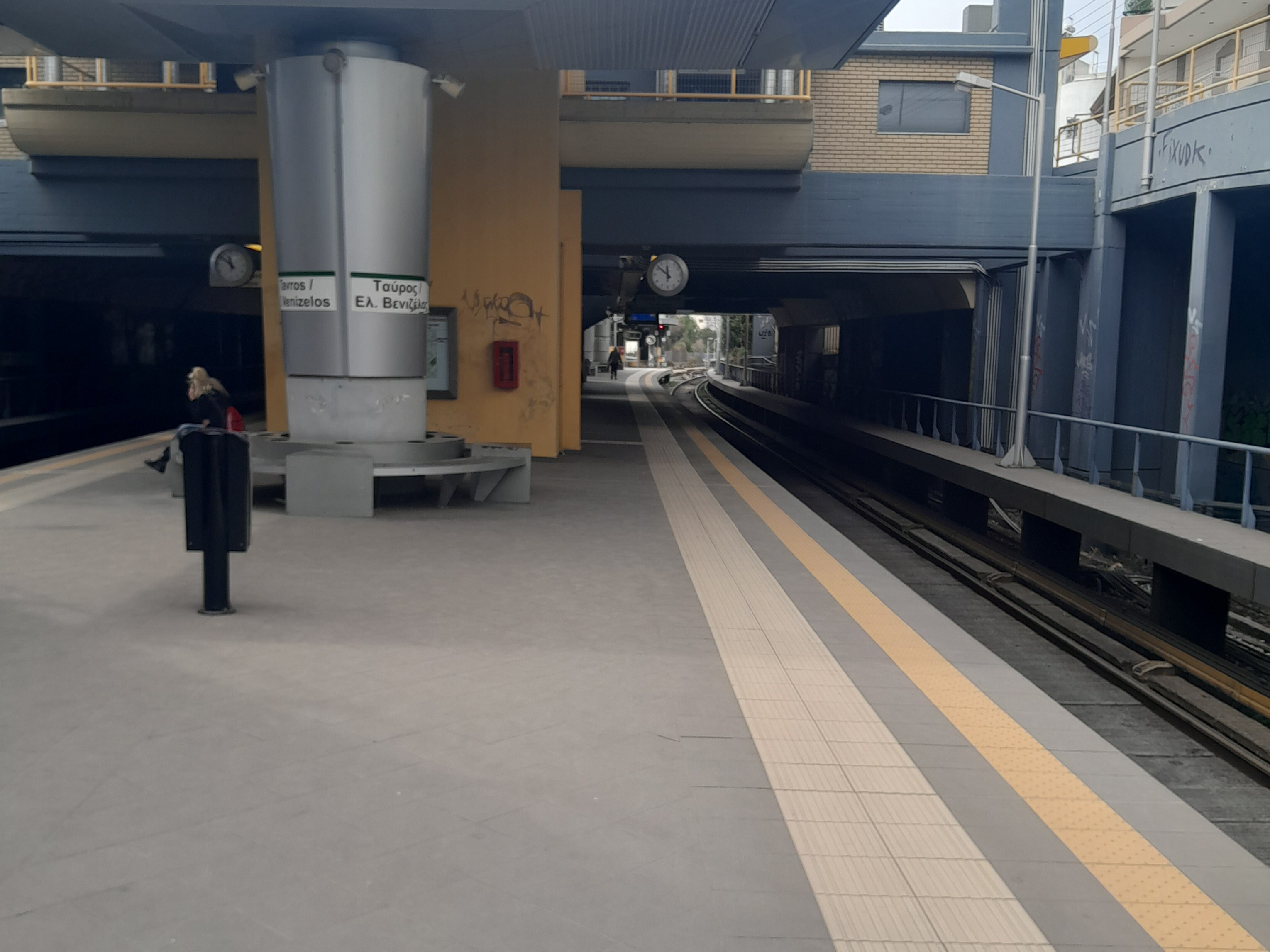
- Station platforms in March 2023

General information
- Location: Moschato-Tavros, South Athens; Greece
- Coordinates: 37.962360°N 23.703330°E
- Manager: STASY
- Line: Athens Metro Line 1
- Platforms: 2
- Tracks: 2

Construction
- Structure type: At-grade
- Accessible: Yes

Key dates
- 27 February 1869: Line opened
- 6 February 1989: Station opened
- 30 January 2004: Station rebuilt

Services
Preceding station	Athens Metro	Following station
Kallithea towards Piraeus	Line 1	Petralona towards Kifissia
Location

Tavros, officially Tavros–Eleftherios Venizelos (Greek: Ταύρος–Ελευθέριος Βενιζέλος) is a station on Line 1 of the Athens Metro, 6.171 km from the line's southern terminus at Piraeus. It is located in the municipality of Tavros in the regional unit of South Athens, Attica, near the boundary with Kallithea. The station is also known as Tavros-Eleftherios Venizelou, after the former Prime Minister Eleftherios Venizelos.

== History ==
The first proposals for a station were made in 1925, when engineer Alexander Verdelis demarcated the Harokopou station at almost the same location as part of his proposal to build a wider subway network for the capital. Construction of the plant began in 1988, and opened on 6 February 1989 at a cost of 200 million drachmas. The station was renovated in 2004 in the run-up to the Summer Olympics that year.

== Station layout ==
G
Concourse
- Customer service
- Tickets
- Entry/Exit
B1
Westbound
← towards Piraeus (Kallithea)
Island platform
Eastbound
towards Kifissia (Petralona) →

== Services ==
In the past the station was the southern terminus of a peak hour train service "Tavros-Ano Patissia", later extended as "Tavros-Irini".
