= Ano Patisia metro station =

Athens Metro station

Άνω Πατήσια Ano Patissia
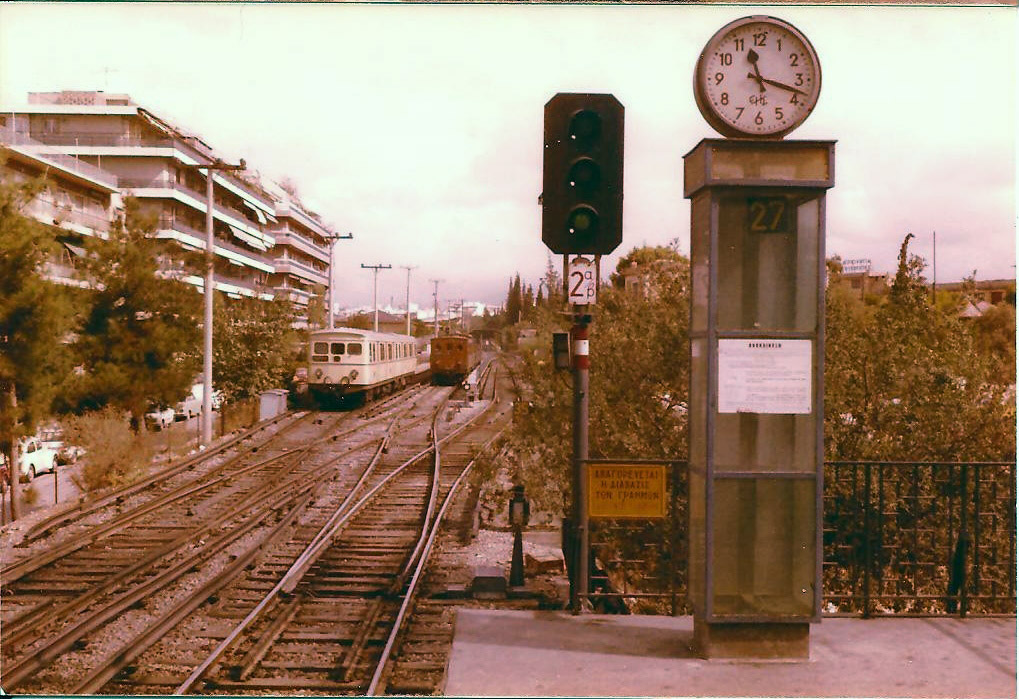
- Station (1979), the northbound starting signal and the reversing siding.

General information
- Location: Athens; Greece
- Coordinates: 38.023735°N 23.735990°E
- Manager: STASY
- Line: Athens Metro Line 1
- Platforms: 2
- Tracks: 2

Construction
- Structure type: Elevated
- Accessible: Yes

Key dates
- 12 February 1956: Opened
- 30 December 2004: Rebuilt

Services
Preceding station	Athens Metro	Following station
Agios Eleftherios towards Piraeus	Line 1	Perissos towards Kifissia
Former services
Preceding station	Former railways	Following station
Kato Patisia towards Lavrion Square	Lavrion Square–Strofyli Railway	Nea Ionia towards Strofyli
Kato Patisia towards Lavrion Square	Athens–Lavrion Railway	Nea Ionia towards Kalogreza or Lavrion
Location

Ano Patisia (Greek: Άνω Πατήσια), also known as Ano Patissia on signage, is an Athens Metro station in Ano Patisia, Athens, Greece. It is located at 15.269 km from the starting point in Piraeus. The current station is built on a viaduct at the location of a train station on the former Lavriou Square-Strofyli railway line.

The old station of Attica Railways was opened on 4 February 1885 and closed down on 8 August 1938, pending electrification. The railway level crossing, which was replaced with a viaduct when the line was electrified, gave the location its old name Alyssida.

The station was converted to standard gauge and was opened as part of the extension of Hellenic Electric Railways (EIS) to Kifissia in February 1956. The station has two platforms and a reversing siding located between the up and down lines, which can connect to either track, so it can be used as a terminal station if needed. Ano Patissia station was actually used until 1985 as the northern terminus of a local service Thision-Patisia, to improve the service in the central part of the line. After a recent renovation for the 2004 Olympic Games, the station features escalators and lifts for disabled people.

The station is located next to the Eastern Orthodox parish church of Saint Barbara and near the shopping area of Ano Patisia.

== Station layout ==
L1
Side platform
Southbound
← towards Piraeus (Agios Eleftherios)
Northbound
towards Kifissia (Perissos) →
Side platform
- Customer service
- Tickets
- Entry/Exit
G
Subway
Underpass between platforms
