= Agios Nikolaos metro station =

Athens Metro station

Άγιος Νικόλαος Aghios Nikolaos
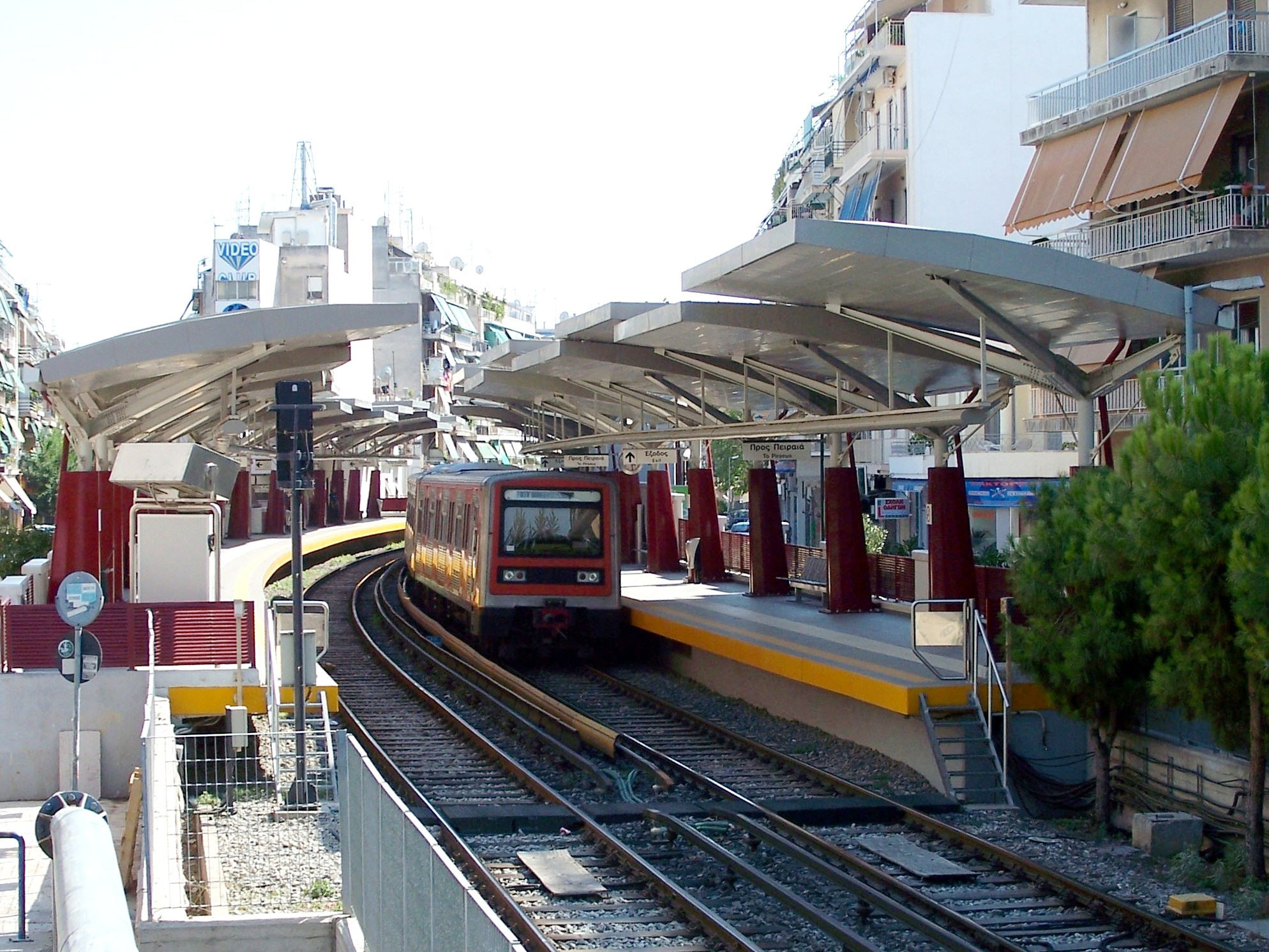
- Piraeus bound train leaving the station.

General information
- Location: Athens; Greece
- Coordinates: 38.006820°N 23.727635°E
- Manager: STASY
- Line: Athens Metro Line 1
- Platforms: 2
- Tracks: 2

Construction
- Structure type: At-grade
- Accessible: Yes (portable boarding ramp recommended)

Key dates
- 12 February 1956: Opened
- 15 December 2003: Rebuilt

Services
Preceding station	Athens Metro	Following station
Attiki towards Piraeus	Line 1	Kato Patisia towards Kifissia
Location

Agios Nikolaos (Greek: Άγιος Νικόλαος), also known as Aghios Nikolaos on signage, is on Athens Metro Line 1. It was opened by the Hellenic Electric Railways on 12 February 1956, and is 13.164 kilometres (8.180 mi) along the line from Piraeus.

== Station Layout ==
G
Side platform
Southbound
← towards Piraeus (Attiki)
Northbound
towards Kifissia (Kato Patisia) →
Side platform
- Customer service
- Tickets
- Entry/Exit
B1
Subway
Underpass between platforms
