= Patisia =

Coordinates: 38°02′N 23°44′E

Patisia Πατήσια
- Neighborhood
- Patisia in Athens Municipality

- Location in Athens
- Country: Greece
- Region: Attica
- City: Athens
- Website: www.cityofathens.gr

Patisia or Patissia (Greek: Πατήσια) is a neighbourhood of Athens, Greece. It is split into two neighbourhoods: Ano Patisia (Upper Patisia) and Kato Patisia (Lower Patisia). The main streets of Patisia are Patision Av. and Acharnon Av.

== Ano Patisia ==
Ano Patisia is the northern, upper part of Patisia. It is served by the Ano Patisia station of the Athens metro. Near the station, there are many businesses and shops, as well as one of the largest private schools in Greece, Lycée Léonin. Further from the train station, there are the premises of Titan Cement, a Greek cement company, as well as buildings of many automotive companies. Ano Patisia has pharmacies and a hospital, the Geniko Nosokomeio Patision. Development in Ano Patisia began in the 1870s.

The Scuola Italiana Statale di Atene, an Italian international school, is in Ano Patisia.

== Kato Patisia ==
Kato Patisia is the southern, lower part of Patisia. It is served by the Kato Patisia station of the Athens metro.

The Church of Agios Andreas is a notable historical structure. A church from the early Christian era in Athens, it was re-established as the katholikon of a monastery established by Saint Philothei in the late 16th century. St. Filothei was known for purchasing the freedom of women who had been forced into the harem during the Ottoman occupation. She was eventually imprisoned for this activity. This monastic church was the site where Ottoman mercenaries beat St. Filothei Ottoman during the evening church vigil service and beat her severely. She remained bedridden and died of her injuries on 19 February 1589.

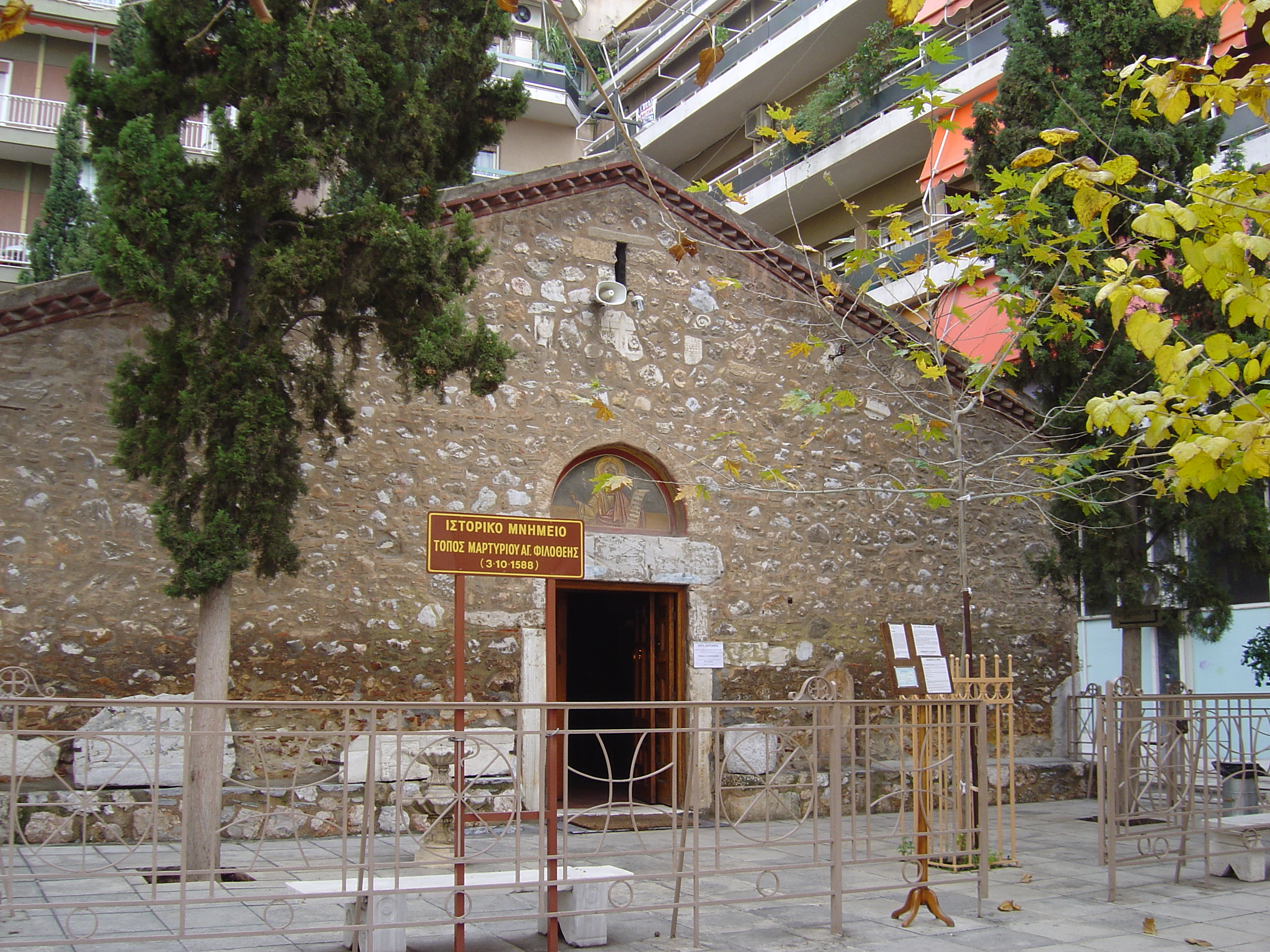
Church of Saint Andreas in Patisia

== Climate ==
Patisia has a hot-summer mediterranean (Csa) climate, with mild winters and hot summers.

Climate data for Patisia 90 m a.s.l.
Month	Jan	Feb	Mar	Apr	May	Jun	Jul	Aug	Sep	Oct	Nov	Dec	Year
Record high °C (°F)	23.4 (74.1)	24.5 (76.1)	26.2 (79.2)	30.9 (87.6)	38.1 (100.6)	42.5 (108.5)	43.5 (110.3)	43.9 (111.0)	38.1 (100.6)	33.5 (92.3)	28.8 (83.8)	22.5 (72.5)	43.9 (111.0)
Mean daily maximum °C (°F)	14.4 (57.9)	16.0 (60.8)	18.1 (64.6)	22.2 (72.0)	26.8 (80.2)	31.3 (88.3)	34.5 (94.1)	34.3 (93.7)	30.0 (86.0)	24.8 (76.6)	20.3 (68.5)	15.9 (60.6)	24.1 (75.3)
Daily mean °C (°F)	11.0 (51.8)	12.4 (54.3)	14.2 (57.6)	17.7 (63.9)	22.3 (72.1)	26.7 (80.1)	30.0 (86.0)	30.0 (86.0)	25.8 (78.4)	20.0 (68.0)	16.8 (62.2)	12.5 (54.5)	20.0 (67.9)
Mean daily minimum °C (°F)	7.5 (45.5)	8.7 (47.7)	10.2 (50.4)	13.2 (55.8)	17.8 (64.0)	22.1 (71.8)	25.4 (77.7)	25.7 (78.3)	21.5 (70.7)	16.9 (62.4)	13.2 (55.8)	9.1 (48.4)	15.9 (60.7)
Record low °C (°F)	−1.2 (29.8)	0.0 (32.0)	1.2 (34.2)	4.8 (40.6)	12.1 (53.8)	14.6 (58.3)	18.4 (65.1)	20.4 (68.7)	14.2 (57.6)	10.2 (50.4)	5.6 (42.1)	1.4 (34.5)	−1.2 (29.8)
Average rainfall mm (inches)	63.1 (2.48)	45.3 (1.78)	36.0 (1.42)	17.7 (0.70)	21.3 (0.84)	29.4 (1.16)	4.7 (0.19)	9.6 (0.38)	32.8 (1.29)	43.9 (1.73)	68.9 (2.71)	72.3 (2.85)	445 (17.53)
Source: National Observatory of Athens (Oct 2012- Mar 2024), World Meteorological Organization, 49th High School.

== Sports ==
Patisia has a gymnasium known as the Sporting Indoor Hall. This gymnasium is the seat of Sporting B.C. a Greek Basketball club founded in 1936 with many successes mainly in women's basketball.
