= Line 1 (Athens Metro) =

Rapid transit line in Athens, Greece

Προς Πειραιά/Κηφισιά To Piraeus/Kifissia
- White number one on a green square
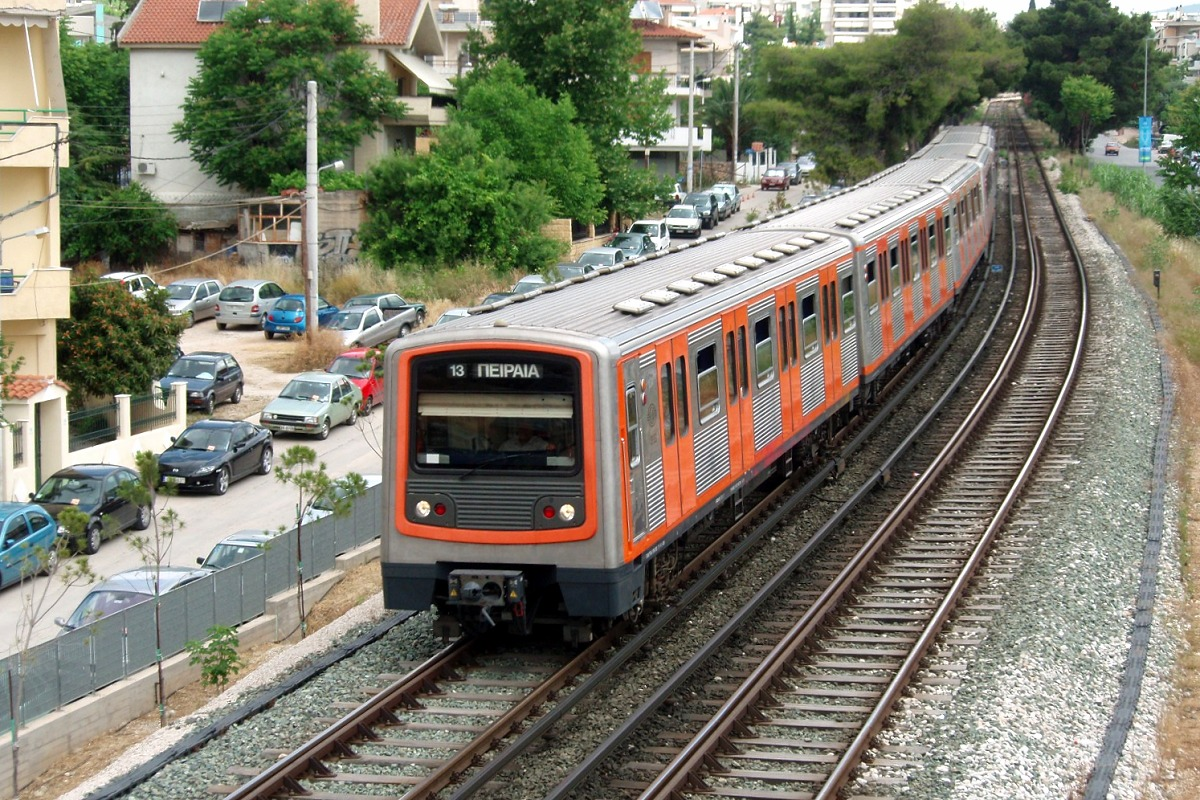
- Southbound Line 1 train entering Nerantziotissa

Overview
- Locale: Athens
- Termini: Piraeus; Kifissia
- Stations: 24
- Colour on map: Green
- Website: Official website

Service
- Type: Rapid transit
- System: Athens Metro
- Operator: STASY
- Depots: Piraeus; Faliro; Thissio; Omonia; Attiki; Irini
- Rolling stock: 8th, 10th and 11th Batches; 1st Generation

History
- Opened: 27 February 1869; 157 years ago
- Last extension: 10 August 1957

Technical
- Line length: 25.7 km (16.0 mi)
- Character: Sub-surface
- Track gauge: 1,435 mm (4 ft 8 1/2 in) standard gauge
- Electrification: 750 V DC third rail

Line 1 is the oldest of the three lines of the Athens Metro, running between Piraeus and Kifissia. The Athens and Piraeus Railway Company (SAP S.A.) first opened the line, between Piraeus and Thiseio, on 27 February 1869. On 4 February 1885 Lavrion Square–Strofyli railway line opened between Attiki Square and Kifissia. These railway lines gradually merged and converted to a rapid-transit system. Line 1 was merged into the Athens Metro network upon the opening of lines 2 and 3 on 28 January 2000, although it remained operationally separate until 2011.

== History ==
The first steam-powered railway in Greece was inaugurated on 27 February 1869 and connected Thisio with Piraeus with a single-track railway. It was electrified in 1904 and since then, taking into account international standards, it can be considered the first metro line in Greece. Over the years, due to electrification, this first railway became known to the general public as the 'Electric Railway' or simply 'The Electric' (Ηλεκτρικός). Gradually, but mainly after the Second World War, it expanded to the north, until it reached Kifissia in 1957. From then until today, it connects Piraeus with the center of Athens and Kifissia, The Electric line is for the most part above ground, although 3.2 kilometers in the center of Athens are underground, while some stations in the northern part of the route are above ground (bridge type). With the creation of two new, underground metro lines in 2000 (Line 2 and Line 3), it was renamed Line 1 of the Athens metro network, as it received the name "Line 1" as the oldest of the network.

In 1855, Prime Minister Alexandros Mavrokordatos tabled a Bill "on the establishment of a railway from Athens to Piraeus", which was published as Law TZ' in the Government Newspaper on 28 December. According to the law, the railway was classified as a project of public necessity, in order for the contractor to carry out the necessary land sales. Also, the right of exploitation was granted to the company or individual who would undertake the project for 55 years. Two years later, said right was increased to 75 years. Attempts to commission the project immediately began, but were unsuccessful. Twelve years later, in 1867, the project was finally awarded to English businessman Edward Pickering. The overland railway begins construction in November of the same year. The following year, in 1868, Pickering commissioned the continuation of the project to the newly founded company "Railways of Athens-Piraeus" (SAP SA).

=== The Thiseio–Piraeus line and the first expansion ===
The opening of the railway was scheduled for 15 February 1869, but was postponed to the 27th of the same month. It was finally ready on 17 February, when the SAP started running test trains.

On 27 February 1869, the Thiseio–Piraeus line was officially inaugurated, with Queen Olga, Prime Minister Thrasyvoulos Zaimis, ministers, soldiers, diplomats, other officials and journalists as passengers on the first route. The first six-car locomotive covered the 8.5 km route from Thisio to Piraeus in about 19 minutes.

A few days after the inauguration, on 3 March, the "Aion" newspaper wrote: "The railway has been working regularly since last Friday. The flow of passengers has reached its maximum. Everyone is talking about the great benefits, let the completion of this work be accomplished. We also hope that this small line will be the beginning of a nationwide railway archipelago"

As the traffic of the line increased, simple stops began to become stations with platforms. In 1882 the stations of Faliro and Moschato were inaugurated. Originally the track was single, but by 1904, when it was electrified, it had been converted into a double track, as is the case to this day.

In order to implement the first extension of this urban means of transport, the Athens to Piraeus Railway Extension Company was founded by Stefanos Psychas and began the construction of a tunnel in 1889 from Thisio to Omonia. The first station of Omonia, which was only partially underground (and partially open trench), was built at the intersection of Lykourgos and Athena streets and was inaugurated on 17 May 1895, together with the Monastiraki intermediate station, with a similar structure.

=== Line "Lavriou Square-Strofyli" ===
In 1882, the Railways of Attica (SA) were established to create and operate a single line that would connect Athens with Lavrio. An extension from Iraklio to Kifissia was added to the original engraving, while it was later extended north to Strofyli. The line was inaugurated in 1885. It was single, metric gauge and operated with a steam engine, the so-called Thirio(Beast). Its starting point was initially in Attica Square, which was named so because that was the starting point of the Attica Railways, while in 1889 the line was extended to the current Lavrio Square, which also took its name from the departure point of the trains to Lavrio.

=== The Elektrikos (Electric line) ===
The electrification of the Piraeus–Omonia line was inaugurated on 16 September 1904. But both the electrification and the tunnel in Omonia, examples of new technologies, were treated with reservation or even fear by many passengers.

In 1926, three fixed-track companies, SAP, Attica Railways and Athens-Piraeus Railways, which operated the trams, cooperated with the English Power group.

Two companies emerged from this collaboration: the Electric Transport Company (HEM), which took over the operation of the Trams and the Kifissia Line, and the Hellenic Electric Railways (EIS). EIS replaced SAP and at the same time committed to improve the existing line and extend the underground tunnel to Attiki station with a double track to join Elektrikos with Kifissia, with a new, underground station below Omonia. In order to facilitate the works, the section of the Lavrio line from the homonymous square to Attica square was abolished and the starting point of the trains returned to the second. At the same time, the construction of a new station in Piraeus began in the same year. The new Piraeus station was inaugurated on 30 June 1928, the same day as the Kallithea station.

The works of the first extension of the urban railway for over thirty years, started in January 1928. On 21 July 1930, the Omonia underground station was inaugurated by Prime Minister Eleftherios Venizelos. In 1937 HEM took over the electrification of the Kifissia railway and in 1938 it abolished Therio, to continue the work of extending the line to the north, however the war prevented the continuation of the works.

Finally, in 1948 the Victoria station was inaugurated and in 1949 the Attiki station. In 1950, HEM granted EIS the completion of the electrification project and the operation of the Athens-Kifisia railway. HEIS continued the works and in 1956 the stations Aghios Nikolaos, Kato Patisia and Ano Patisia, Perissos and Nea Ionia were delivered. At the beginning of 1957, the Iraklio station was handed over, while on August 18 the line was connected to its terminus with the operation of the Kifissia station. Now the urban railway, which had become known in public opinion as "Electric" (because of the electrification, in contrast to the older steam-powered "Thirio"), connected Piraeus with Kifissia. This was also the last kilometer extension of the line, but in the following years and decades the stations included increased, with the gradual addition of intermediate stations. Two weeks later, on 1 September, the Marousi station was handed over, while in 1961 Agios Eleftherios was inaugurated.

In 1976, the Hellenic Electric Railways, fifty years after their establishment, were acquired by the Greek State and renamed the Athens-Piraeus Electric Railways (ISAP). In the 1980s, three intermediate (along the line) new stations were built: Eirini station, designed to serve OAKA and opened on 3 September 1982 the Tavros station, inaugurated on 6 February 1989, and that of KAT, which was built with the aim of serving the adjacent hospital of the same name and was inaugurated on 27 March 1989.

Between 2001 and 2004, in view of the 2004 Olympic Games, an extensive program of renovations of all the stations of the line took place, while between 2008 and 2011, reconstruction works were carried out on the railway line from Neo Faliro to Kifissia. Also, the Neratziotissa station was built, which allows transfers from Line 1 to the Suburban network.

In 2011, ISAP SA became a subsidiary company of OASA was absorbed, together with TRAM SA, by AMEL SA, which was renamed STASY SA.

== Rolling stock ==
The network uses quintuplet and hex tuple railcars to run the routes. The quintuplets are older types and are limited to line 1.

- 8th Generation of 1983 (production line 101-II) and 10th Generation of 1993 (production line 146), Quintuplets (2+3), these vehicles often travel together. Starting from 2023, 14 8th generation units were refurbished by Spanish manufacturer CAF in Volos, featuring new AC motors, air conditioning, LED screens, new seating and improved accessibility. The first refurbished unit entered service in October 2026.
- 11th Generation of 2000 (production line 3101), Sixtuple railcars (3+3).
- 1st Generation of 2000, Cab triplets in one vehicle. They are available in 3+3 compositions. These trains started their use on lines 2 and 3 first, but were placed on line 1 to fill the gap of rolling stock whilst the 8th generation units were withdrawn for their refurbishment.

== Network ==
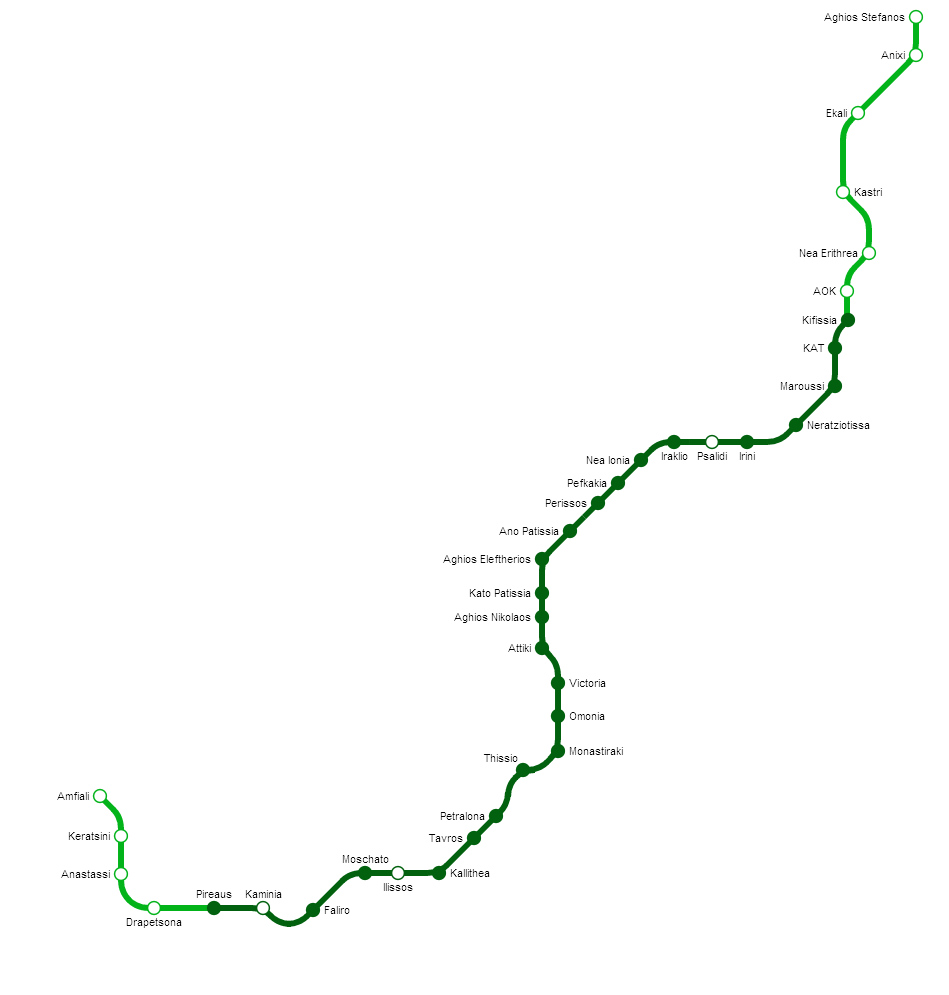
Line 1 map, including possible future extensions and stations.

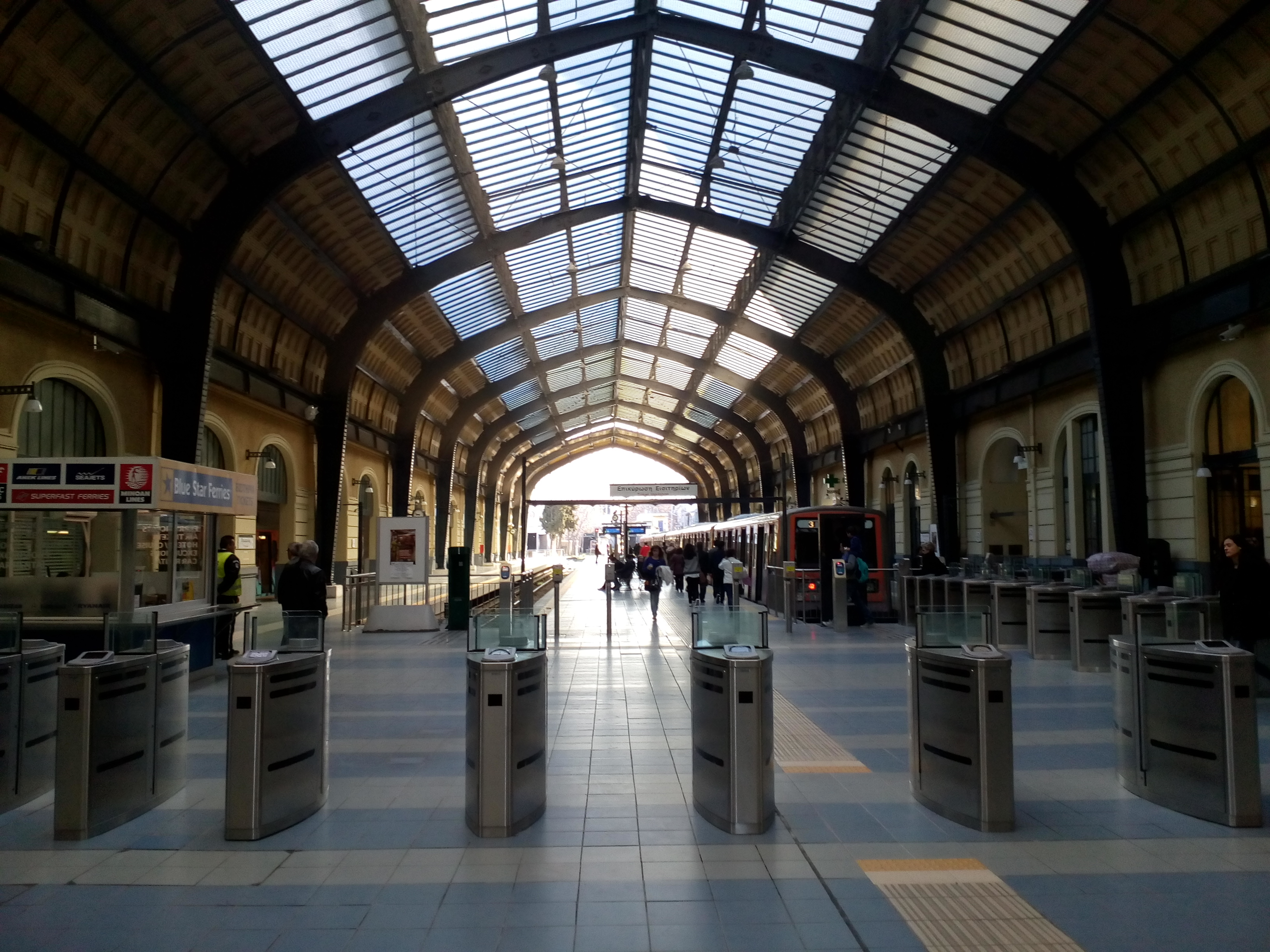
Piraeus station

Line 1 connects the port of Piraeus with the northern suburb of Kifissia. It is built to 1,435 mm (4 ft 8 1/2 in) standard gauge and is electrified using the 750 V DC, third rail, top contact system, also used by Lines 2 and 3. The travel time is about 51 minutes.

From Piraeus the line runs eastwards to Faliro and then north to Moschato, Kallithea, Tavros, Petralona, Thissio, Monastiraki, Omonia, Victoria and Attiki. Between Monastiraki and Attiki the line runs underground. At Monastiraki passengers can change to Line 3 and at Omonia and Attiki to Line 2. From Attiki the line continues north, following the alignment of the old Lavrion Square-Strofyli railway through Patissia, Nea Ionia, Iraklio, Marousi and terminates at Kifissia. At Nerantziotissa station passengers can change to the Athens Suburban Railway, for Athens International Airport.

Line 1 has a physical connection to Line 2 at Attiki station.

== Future ==
=== Rolling stock refurbishment ===
According to Transportation Minister Christos Staikouras, in "NK trailers" factory of Volos 14 8th generation trains were to be refurbished, with the first one arriving in December 2025 in hopes of all of them having been prepared until 2026. The refurbishment is being carried out by Spanish manufacturer CAF and involves the replacement of existing DC motors with modern AC ones, installation of air conditioning, LED screens, as well as refurbished interior and seating and improved wheelchair accessibility. The first refurbished unit ultimately entered service in October 2026. 10 additional units are to be refurbished at a later date.

=== Extensions ===
==== Extension towards Nea Erythraia ====
Since 2008, ISAP S.A., and subsequently STASY S.A., proposed a two-phase northern extension of Line 1 from Kifissia to Agios Stefanos, via Ethniki Odos (Athinon-Lamias) near Ekali, bringing the Dionysos municipality into the Athens Metro catchment area.

The first phase includes new stations at AOK, Nea Erithrea, Athens Metro and Ethniki Odos, but requires the reconstruction of Kifissia into an underground station. The second phase would be mostly sub-surface, with new stations at Anixi and Agios Stefanos.

Since 2020 the project has been decided to consist of an underground part (including a new underground Kifissia station) and the initial extension until Nea Erythrea, with the stations between Agios Stefanos and Nea Erythrea utilising the Suburban railways of OSE, with a further extension towards Varympompi Junction.

Station	Municipality	Interchanges and notes
Kifissia	Kifissia	New Underground Station
ΑΟΚ	Kifissia	
Nea Erithrea	Nea Erithrea	
Varympompi Jct	Acharnes	On Ethniki Odos

==== Extension towards Palaio Faliro ====
Plans to extend Line 1 from Thiseio to the Stavros Niarchos Foundation Cultural Center in Kallithea originated as part of the southern branch of Line 6 in the long-term Athens Metro Future Regulatory Plan (or the Souflias plan) of April 2009: the proposal would have seen trains from the SNFCC to Melissia in the north east, and Idreika in the Piraeus peninsula.

Proposals for this line saw little activity from January 2012 to December 2021, when it was partially reconsidered as a branch of Line 1 from Thiseio to the SNFCC, with intermediate stations at Hamosternas, Plateia Davaki, and Lofos Filaretou. Attiko Metro also announced the possibility of a further extension towards Palaio Faliro, along Amfitheas Avenue, instead of Idreika.

When the topographical survey was done it was decided that there would be an underground diversion from the station of Thiseio branching out to 3.5 km consisting of 4 stations: Ano Petralona, Plateia Davaki, Lofos Filaretou ending at Stavros Niarchos Foundation Cultural Center near Delta Falirou.

Station	Municipality	Interchanges and notes
Ano Petralona	Athens	
Plateia Davaki	Kallithea	
Lofos Filaretou	Kallithea	
Stavros Niarchos	Kallithea	On Stavros Niarchos Foundation Cultural Center and with possible interchange with Tram at Delta Falirou.

=== Other proposed extensions ===
==== Kaminia, Ilissos and Psalidi stations ====
In November 2008, ISAP proposed three new stations along the existing Line 1. they were: Kaminia, located next to Kerani Square, and between Piraeus and Neo Faliro; Ilissos, between Moschato and Kallithea; and Psalidi, between Iraklio and Eirini. All three stations were also included in the Souflias plan.

==== Towards Drapetsona ====
The Souflias plan of April 2009 also included a proposal to extend Line 1 from Faliro to Drapetsona and Amfiali (in Keratsini), with a new underground station for Piraeus.

== Accidents ==
=== Incidents of People falling on the rail tracks ===
Either by accident or on purpose (e.g. rail suicide) it is unfortunately rather common. On 29 July 2022 a man fell on the tracks of Ano Patissia with the tracks temporarily shutting down as the police and medics were assessing the situation. On 26 May 2024 a person fell on the tracks of line 1 in the station of Nea Ionia where police vehicles and ambulances were sent to analyse the situation, with the tracks shutting down temporarily. In October of the same year the same event happened in a pedestrian bridge near KAT station. In December of the same year the same event happened with a man falling off a pedestrian bridge near Ano Patissia onto the tracks below him where medics were sent to recover him delaying the tracks almost 7 minutes. On 13 January 2025 a 69-year-old man fell off the station of Aghios Eleftherios halting the schedules and being found dead by ELAS.

Place	Date	Notes	References
Ano Patissia	29 July 2022		
Nea Ionia Station	26 May 2024		
KAT station	16 October 2024		
Ano Patissia	19 December 2024	Tracks got delayed 7 minutes	
Aghios Eleftherios	13 January 2025	It resulted in the death of a 69-year-old man	

=== Other Incidents ===
On 16 November 2021 a train near the station of Aghios Nikolaos collided with a group of workers on a machine used for sanding the tracks, killing one and injuring 2 of the workers working there. On 25 September 2024 the tracks between the stations of Neratziotissa and Eirini caught on fire due to dry fallen trees, firefighters were quickly dispatched, the train halted and the passengers quickly got off with no injuries. On 1 January 2025 the first train scheduled for 2025 malfunctioned having its doors on one side of the train open while in motion between the stations of Ano Patisia and Perissos this took place just 2 days after another incident where in the station of Moschato the tracks started releasing an alarmingly dense amount of smoke. The Unionized workers of STASY released a statement saying "Every day that dawns on Line 1 the workers cross their fingers[...]". Just a month later on 31 January in the same station of Moschato the same event happened in the same fashion with officials stating that it may have been caused by a malfunction, most likely, during the use of the breaks. On 26 November 2025 a 56 year old technician was killed by heavy machinery, weighting over 300 kilos on Piraeus maintenance depot. The same day line 1 and Trams did an emergency strike from 12:00 till 18:00. Police is still investigating the case

Place	Date	Notes	References
Aghios Nikolaos	16 November 2021	Collision between train and sanding machine	
Neratziotissa - Eirini	25 September 2024	fire on the train tracks	
Moschato	30 December 2024	dense smoke released by the tracks	
Ano Patisia - Perissos	1 January 2025	doors opened while in motion	
Moschato	31 January 2025	dense smoke released by the tracks	

== Map ==
The route of Line 1

== Stations ==
The spelling of the station names on this table, in English and Greek, are according to the signage. The list also runs from south to north, because the former Athens–Piraeus Electric Railways measured all distances from Piraeus.

The layout of Line 1 stations have some variety, compared to the other two lines on the system (including the upcoming Line 4). Although most stations have two tracks and two side platforms, four stations (Irini, Neo Faliro, Omonia and Piraeus) have a Spanish solution layout of two tracks and three platforms, Tavros has an island platform, and Kifissia has a bay platform with a second track on the western side of the platform.

†	Terminal station
#	Interchange station

Station English	Station Greek	Image	Municipality	Opened	Interchanges and notes	Position
Piraeus^{†#}	Πειραιάς (Note: Formerly signed as Πειραιεύς (Peiraieus): one surviving sign with such spelling can be found above the western entrance.)		Piraeus	27 February 1869 (Note: The Line 3 station opened on 10 October 2022.)	Interchange with Line 3 and the Athens Suburban Railway.	37.948020°N 23.643555°E
Neo Faliro^{#}	Νέο Φάληρο		Piraeus	9 August 1882 resited 1887	Interchange with the Athens Tram at Gipedo Karaiskaki (towards Piraeus) or Stadio Irinis & Filias (towards Glyfada). This station opened after the original route.	37.944960°N 23.665285°E
Moschato	Μοσχάτο		Moschato-Tavros	9 August 1882	This station opened after the original route.	37.955250°N 23.680465°E
Kallithea	Καλλιθέα		Kallithea; Moschato-Tavros	1 July 1928	This station opened after the original route.	37.960395°N 23.697005°E
Tavros; Eleftherios Venizelos	Ταύρος; Ελευθέριος Βενιζέλος		Moschato-Tavros	6 February 1989	This station opened after the original route.	37.962360°N 23.703330°E
Petralona	Πετράλωνα		Athens	22 November 1954	This station opened after the original route.	37.968455°N 23.709115°E
Thissio	Θησείο		Athens	27 February 1869	This station was the original eastern terminus of Line 1, from 1869 to 1895: a train depot is next to the station.	37.976755°N 23.720130°E
Monastiraki^{#}	Μοναστηράκι		Athens	17 May 1895 (Note: The Line 3 station opened on 22 April 2003.)	Interchange with Line 3. Some platform signs on Line 1 use the station's Katharevousa name, "Monastirion" (Μοναστήριον).	37.975985°N 23.725390°E
Omonia^{#}	Ομόνοια		Athens	17 May 1895 (Note: The Line 2 station opened on 28 January 2000.) resited 21 July 1930	Interchange with Line 2.	37.984030°N 23.727970°E
Victoria	Βικτώρια		Athens	1 March 1948		37.992960°N 23.730195°E
Attiki^{#}	Αττική		Athens	30 June 1949	Interchange with Line 2.	37.999495°N 23.722800°E
Aghios Nikolaos	Άγιος Νικόλαος		Athens	12 February 1956		38.006820°N 23.727635°E
Kato Patissia	Κάτω Πατήσια		Athens	12 February 1956		38.011505°N 23.728560°E
Aghios Eleftherios	Άγιος Ελευθέριος		Athens	4 August 1961	This station opened after the extension to Ano Patisia.	38.019805°N 23.731630°E
Ano Patissia	Άνω Πατήσια		Athens	12 February 1956		38.023735°N 23.735990°E
Perissos	Περισσός		Nea Ionia	14 March 1956		38.032785°N 23.744700°E
Pefkakia	Πευκάκια		Nea Ionia	5 July 1956	This station opened after the extension to Nea Ionia.	38.037040°N 23.750120°E
Nea Ionia	Νέα Ιωνία		Nea Ionia	14 March 1956		38.041430°N 23.754835°E
Iraklio	Ηράκλειο		Irakleio	4 March 1957		38.046200°N 23.766000°E
Irini	Ειρήνη		Marousi	3 September 1982	This station opened after the extension to Kifissia.	38.043280°N 23.783310°E
Nerantziotissa (Note: Nerantziotissa is signed as "Neratziotissa" (Greek: Νερατζιώτισσα) on the Athens Suburban Railway.)^{#}	Νεραντζιώτισσα		Marousi	6 August 2004	Interchange with the Athens Suburban Railway. This station opened after the extension to Kifissia.	38.045120°N 23.792945°E
Marousi	Μαρούσι		Marousi	1 September 1957	This station opened after the extension to Kifissia.	38.056225°N 23.804915°E
KAT	ΚΑΤ		Kifissia; Marousi	27 March 1989	This station opened after the extension to Kifissia.	38.065955°N 23.804020°E
Kifissia^{†}	Κηφισιά		Kifissia	10 August 1957		38.073225°N 23.808160°E
