= Perissos metro station =

Athens Metro station

Περισσός Perissos
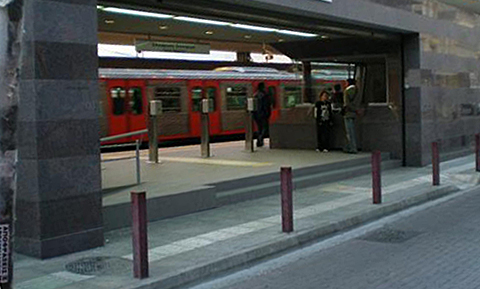
- Platform of Perissos metro station, with train waiting to depart (2006)

General information
- Location: Perissos; Nea Ionia; Greece
- Coordinates: 38.032785°N 23.744700°E
- Manager: STASY
- Line: Athens Metro Line 1
- Platforms: 2
- Tracks: 2

Construction
- Structure type: Embankment
- Accessible: Yes

Key dates
- 14 March 1956: Opened
- 10 August 2004: Rebuilt

Services
Preceding station	Athens Metro	Following station
Ano Patisia towards Piraeus	Line 1	Pefkakia towards Kifissia
Location

Perissos (Greek: Περισσός) is a station on Athens Metro Line 1 in the municipality of Nea Ionia in the regional unit of North Athens, Attica, Greece. It is 16.556 km from Piraeus. The station is founded by the limits of Nea Ionia and is named after the neighbourhood of Perissos. It was opened by the Hellenic Electric Railways on 14 March 1956, and was renovated in 2004. It features two platforms.

The station features escalators and lifts for disabled people.

== Station Layout ==
UG
Side platform
Southbound
← towards Piraeus (Ano Patisia)
Northbound
towards Kifissia (Pefkakia) →
Side platform
Street level
(South side)
- Customer service
- Tickets
- Entry/Exit
LG
Street level
(North side)
- Tickets
- Entry/Exit
B1
Subway
Underpass between platforms
