= Pefkakia metro station =

Athens Metro station

Πευκάκια Pefkakia
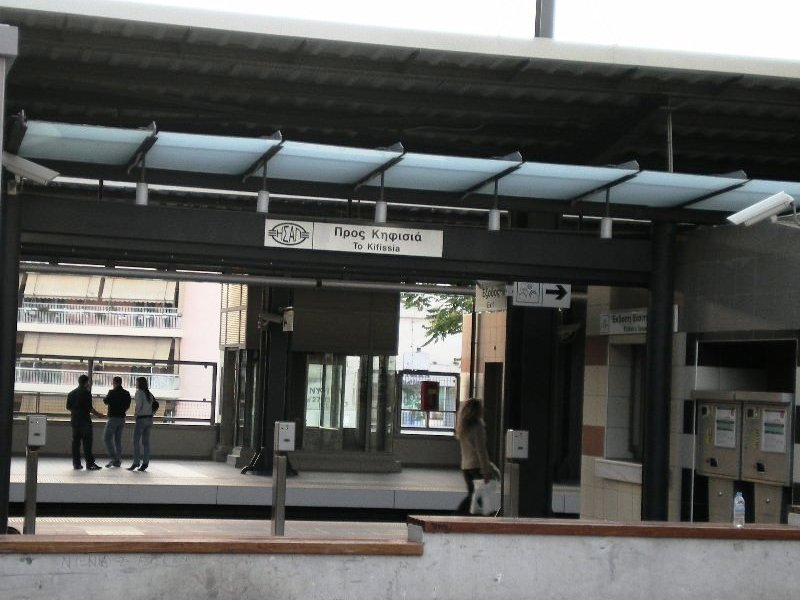
- Pefkakia metro station

General information
- Location: Nea Ionia; Greece
- Coordinates: 38.037040°N 23.750120°E
- Manager: STASY
- Line: Athens Metro Line 1
- Platforms: 2
- Tracks: 2

Construction
- Structure type: Embankment
- Accessible: Yes

Key dates
- 14 March 1956: Line opened
- 5 July 1956: Station opened
- 25 May 2004: Station rebuilt

Services
Preceding station	Athens Metro	Following station
Perissos towards Piraeus	Line 1	Nea Ionia towards Kifissia
Location

Pefkakia (Greek: Πευκάκια) is a metro station in the municipality of Nea Ionia in the regional unit of North Athens, Attica, Greece. It is marked at the 17.231 km from the starting point in Piraeus. The station is founded by the limits of Nea Ionia and is named after the neighbourhood of Pefkakia. It was first opened by the Hellenic Electric Railways on 5 July 1956, and was renovated in 2004. It has two platforms.

Between the 1990s and 2002, the station was known as Pefkakia-Inepoli, the second name originated from the neighbourhood of Inepoli, the name of the station dropped the second name during the start of the construction and is the current name since that time.

== Station Layout ==
UG
Side platform
Southbound
← towards Piraeus (Perissos)
Northbound
towards Kifissia (Nea Ionia) →
Side platform
Street level
(South side)
- Tickets
- Exits
LG
Concourse
(North side)
- Customer service
- Tickets
- Entry/Exit
- Shops
