= Nea Ionia metro station =

Athens Metro station

Νέα Ιωνία Nea Ionia
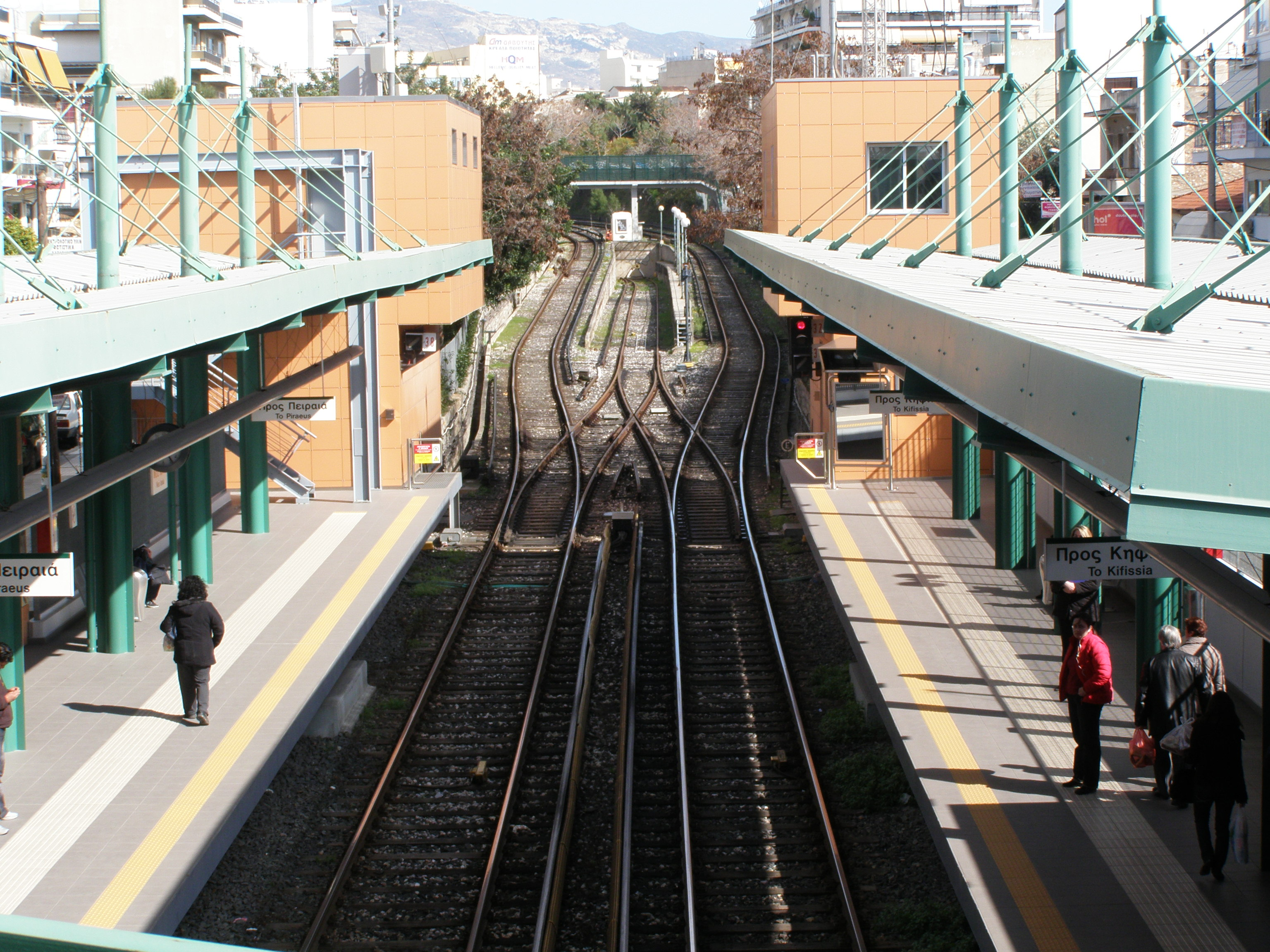
- Station and reversing siding as seen from the pedestrian crossing.

General information
- Location: Nea Ionia; Greece
- Coordinates: 38.041430°N 23.754835°E
- Manager: STASY
- Line: Athens Metro Line 1
- Platforms: 2
- Tracks: 2

Construction
- Structure type: At-grade
- Accessible: Yes

Key dates
- 14 March 1956: Opened
- 16 March 2003: Rebuilt

Services
Preceding station	Athens Metro	Following station
Pefkakia towards Piraeus	Line 1	Irakleio towards Kifissia
Former services
Preceding station	Former railways	Following station
Ano Patisia towards Lavrion Square	Lavrion Square–Strofyli Railway	Irakleio towards Strofyli
Ano Patisia towards Lavrion Square	Athens–Lavrion Railway	Irakleio towards Kalogreza or Lavrion
Location

Nea Ionia (Greek: Νέα Ιωνία) is a metro station in the municipality of Nea Ionia in the regional unit of North Athens, Attica, Greece. It is located 17.923 km (11.137 mi) from the datum point in Piraeus. It was previous a train station operated by Attica Railways that served Lavriou Square and Strofyli, it was 7.340 km (4.561 mi) from Lavriou Square.

The first station on this site was open from 1922 to 1938. This station was named Podarades (Ποδαράδες) for an older name of the settlement which later became the city of Nea Ionia, named for refugees from an area formerly called Ionia in Asia Minor. The present Metro station was opened by the Hellenic Electric Railways on 14 March 1956, and was the northernmost terminus of Line 1 until 4 March 1957. The station, which features two side platforms was renovated in 2003–4.

== Station Layout ==
L1
Mezzanine
- Entry/Exit
- Shop
G
Concourse
- Customer service
- Tickets
- Entry/Exit
- Shop
Side platform
Southbound
← towards Piraeus (Pefkakia)
Northbound
towards Kifissia (Irakleio) →
Side platform
