= Marousi metro station =

Athens Metro station

Μαρούσι Marousi
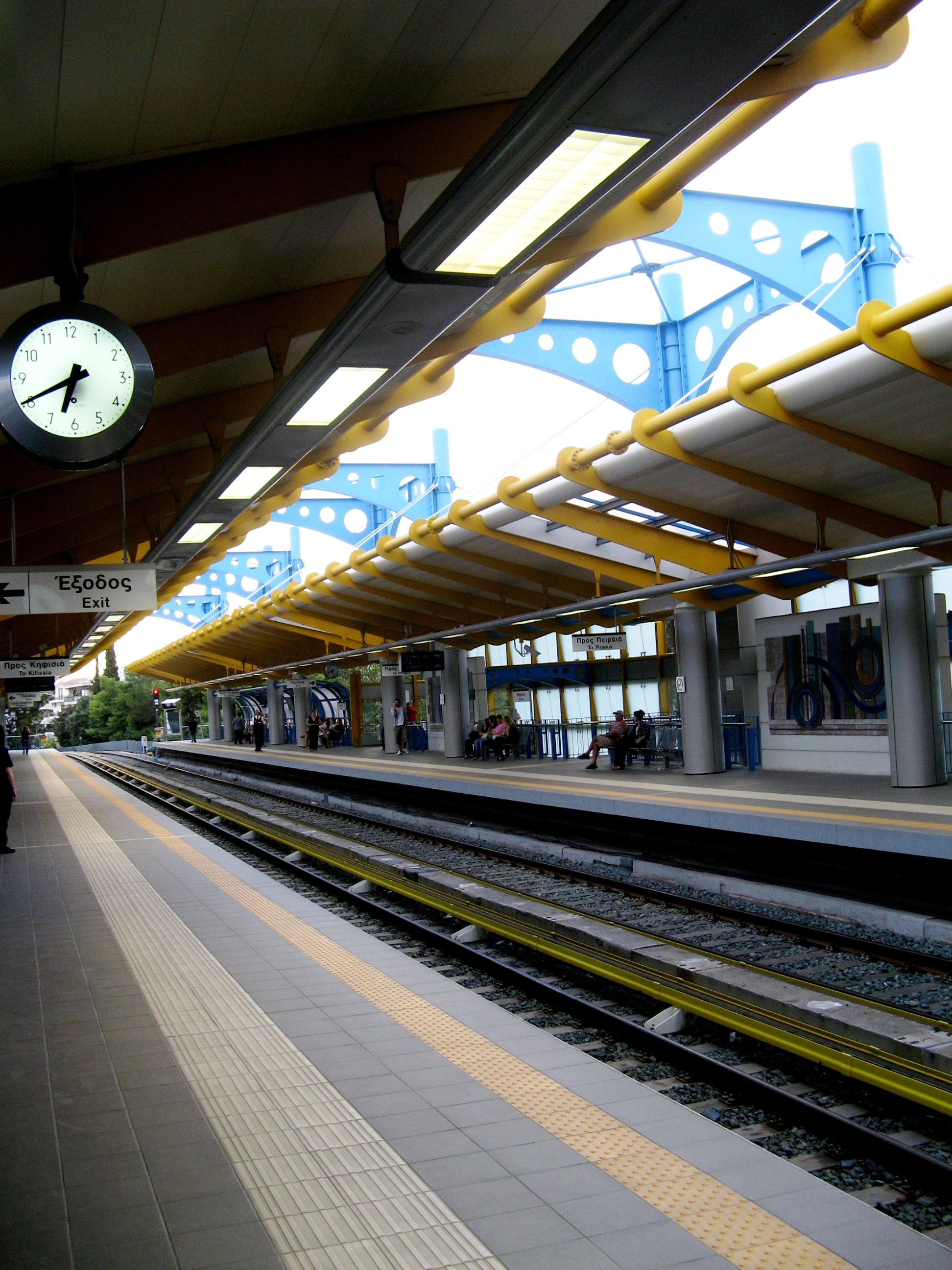
- Marousi metro station, October 2007

General information
- Location: 151 22 Marousi; Greece
- Coordinates: 38.056225°N 23.804915°E
- Manager: STASY
- Line: Athens Metro Line 1
- Platforms: 2
- Tracks: 2

Construction
- Structure type: Elevated
- Accessible: Yes

Key dates
- 10 August 1957: Line opened
- 1 September 1957: Station opened
- 14 March 2004: Station rebuilt

Services
Preceding station	Athens Metro	Following station
Nerantziotissa towards Piraeus	Line 1	KAT towards Kifissia
Former services
Preceding station	Former railways	Following station
Irakleio towards Lavrion Square	Lavrion Square–Strofyli Railway	Kifissia towards Strofyli
Location

Marousi (Greek: Μαρούσι), also known as Maroussi, is an Athens Metro station in Marousi, a northern suburb in Athens. The station is served by Line 1, and is 23.46 kilometres (14.58 miles) down the line from the southern terminus of Piraeus, between Nerantziotissa to the south and KAT to the north.

The station is managed by STASY, and was rebuilt with step-free access as part of the renovation of Line 1 in 2004.

== History ==
The Marousi metro station is on the site of a former Lavrion Square–Strofyli railway station called Amarousion, which was open from 4 February 1885 to 8 August 1938.

The current metro station on an elevated viaduct was built by the Hellenic Electric Railways, and opened on 1 September 1957: in 2004, the Athens–Piraeus Electric Railways renovated the station with a new roof and step-free access.

== Proposals ==
Since the late 1990s, Elliniko Metro and the Greek government have proposed that Marousi would serve a second metro line. The first proposal consisted of a branch of Line 3 from Panormou, which would be partially elevated after Filothei. In December 2005, Elliniko Metro revised the proposal to a U-shaped Line 4 from this station to Alsos Veikou via Kaisariani, because they believed that the branch would have limited the capacity of Line 3.

== Layout ==
L1
Side platform
Southbound
← towards Piraeus (Nerantziotissa)
Northbound
towards Kifissia (KAT) →
Side platform
G
Concourse
- Customer service
- Tickets
- Entry/Exit
