= Greek industrial railways =

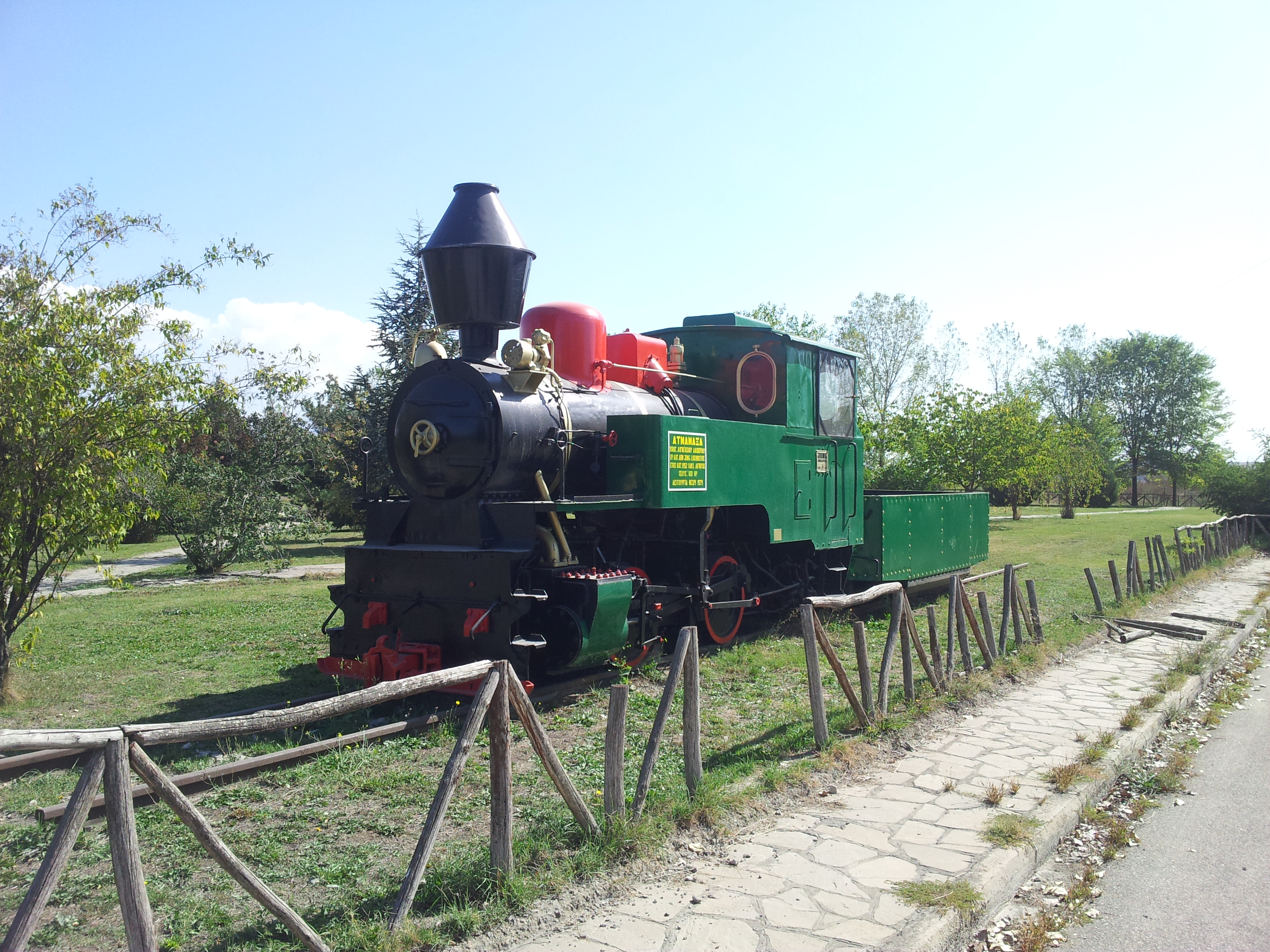
A preserved meter gauge steam locomotive from a PPC mining railway

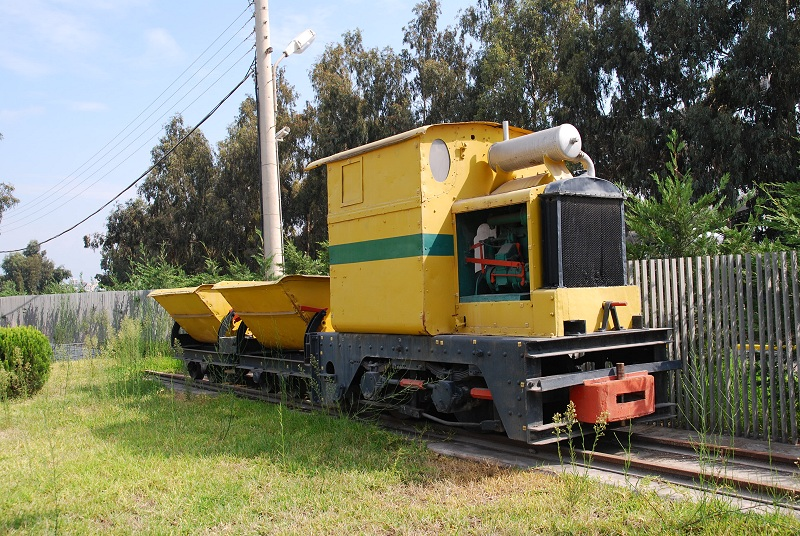
A narrow gauge mining train

A number of private industrial railway lines were constructed in Greece for exclusive use by major mining operations and by extensive industrial facilities. There were also a few temporary lines, used for the construction of major public works. Most of them were either metre gauge or 600 mm (1 ft 11 5/8 in) narrow gauge.

- Aliveri power station, 1,000 mm (3 ft 3 3/8 in) metre gauge
- LIPTOL and Ptolemais power stations, 900 mm (2 ft 11 7/16 in)
- Tsalapatas brick and rooftiles works, Volos (39.365°N 22.932°E), 600 mm (1 ft 11 5/8 in) narrow gauge. The works have been converted to an industrial museum, where a Decauville steam locomotive and some cars are on display.
- Eretria chromium mines, 600 mm (1 ft 11 5/8 in) narrow gauge, with an exchange siding with Thessaly Railways at Rigion.
- Laurium mines, 1,000 mm (3 ft 3 3/8 in) connecting with Athens-Lavrion Railway, 600 mm (1 ft 11 5/8 in) narrow gauge and special 550 mm (21 21/32 in) gauge.
- English Marble Company at Dionyssos, 600 mm (1 ft 11 5/8 in) narrow gauge and metre gauge connecting with Lavrion Square-Strofyli railway.
- LARCO nickel mines, Larymna.
- Heraklion Crete port (Koule) - Xiropotamos, for the construction of the Heraklion Crete port (1922-1934).

== Aliveri mines and power station railway ==
Aliveri industrial railway
Technical
- Track gauge: 1,000 mm (3 ft 3 3/8 in) metre gauge
- Length: 22 km (14 mi)

The railway network of Aliveri power station was relatively extensive. It was used to transport lignite (brown coal) from nearby mines to the power station, which was located near the sea, so that it could use sea water for cooling.

The Aliveri metre gauge network (1958) was built by the Public Power Corporation on the site of a smaller 600 mm (1 ft 11 5/8 in) network and was extended to new areas, having a total length of 22 kilometres (14 mi). It was used to carry lignite from the underground coal mines, which were located inland, to the electric power station. It was also used to carry ash, which was dumped in the mining area. The trains were initially hauled by five Jung steam locomotives, which were replaced by four Nippon Saryo and one Diema diesel locomotives around 1980. An Orenstein & Koppel diesel locomotive (1958) was used as a shunter in the steel construction department of the station. The network was in regular operation until 1988, when the power station was converted to burn heavy fuel oil and the mines were closed down.

In addition to the metre gauge network, within the mines area lignite was carried by a 600 mm (1 ft 11 5/8 in) (Decauville system) railway system. This small mining railway was electrified and used three AEG EL5 and three AEG EL6 locomotives. It was abandoned in 1970, when the tunnels flooded and mining started on lignite deposits near the surface.

One of the Nippon Saryo locomotives survives in excellent condition and is used at Velestino by EMOS, a preservation society operating on an abandoned section of Thessaly Railways.

== Ptolemais mining railways ==
Ptolemais industrial railway
Technical
- Track gauge: 900 mm (2 ft 11 7/16 in)

The economy of the area around Ptolemais is largely based on the lignite (brown coal) mines. The major industries were AEVAL (fertilizers), the Public Power Corporation power plants (electricity generation) and LIPTOL (cogeneration of electricity and production of dried lignite in dust and brick form). The Hellenic State Railways built a standard gauge branch from Amyntaio, which extends to Kozani with a major branch to Agios Dimitrios power plant and minor branches from Komanos stations to other power plants around Ptolemais.

In addition to the public rail network, industries the area were served by a dedicated 900 mm (2 ft 11 7/16 in) gauge mine railway, which connected the two major lignite mining areas (Northern field and Western field) to the industrial consumers. The network used twelve electric Bo-Bo locomotives (type EL 4 made in Germany) of 760 kilowatts (1,020 hp) and four B shunters. The rail network was gradually closed down when the initial lignite fields were exhausted, as new fields are better served by conveyor belt systems.

== See also ==
- Rail transport in Greece
- Mine railway
- Decauville
- Forgotten, abandoned & lost railways around Greece on YouTube
