= Irakleio metro station =

Athens Metro station

Ηράκλειο Iraklio
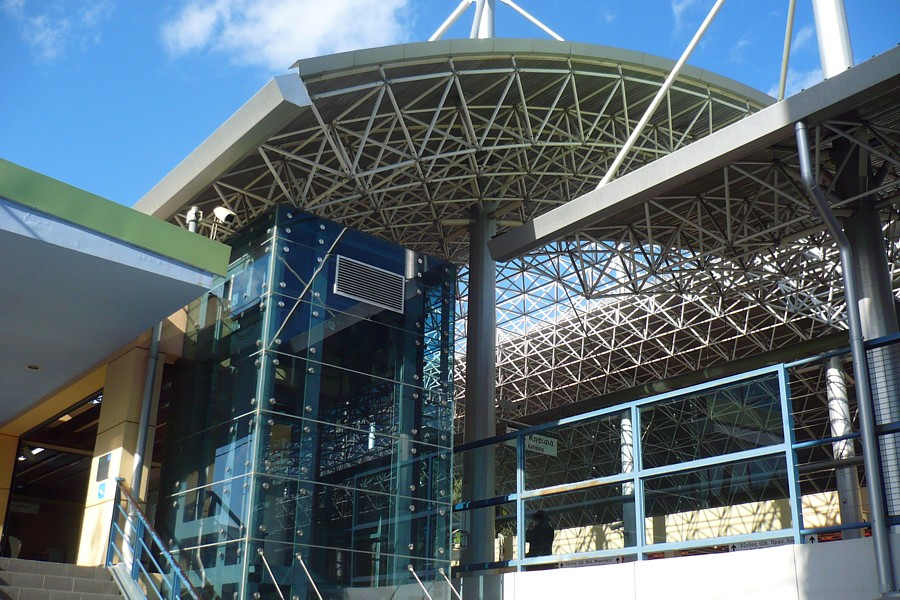
- Station entrance

General information
- Location: Irakleio; Greece
- Coordinates: 38.046200°N 23.766000°E
- Manager: STASY
- Line: Athens Metro Line 1
- Platforms: 2
- Tracks: 2

Construction
- Structure type: At-grade
- Accessible: Yes

Key dates
- 4 March 1957: Opened
- 18 July 2004: Rebuilt

Services
Preceding station	Athens Metro	Following station
Nea Ionia towards Piraeus	Line 1	Eirini towards Kifissia
Former services
Preceding station	Former railways	Following station
Nea Ionia towards Lavrion Square	Lavrion Square–Strofyli Railway	Marousi towards Strofyli
Nea Ionia towards Lavrion Square	Athens–Lavrion Railway Lavrion branch	Chalandri towards Lavrion
Nea Ionia towards Lavrion Square	Athens–Lavrion Railway Kalogreza branch	Kalogreza Terminus
Location

Irakleio (Greek: Ηράκλειο, lit. 'Heraklion'), also known as Iraklio on signage, is an Athens metro station in the municipality of Irakleio in the regional unit of North Athens, Attica, Greece. It is marked at the 19.246 km from the starting point in Piraeus station of Line 1.

Initially, the station served the Athens–Lavrion Railway and Lavrion Square-Strofyli railway, ran by the Attica Railways. From 1929 the Lavrion branch was operated by Piraeus, Athens and Peloponnese Railways. The station was closed in 1938 for Kifissia traffic but remained open for Lavrion trains until 1957/1962. At the same location, the present station of EIS was opened on 4 March 1957, using the same name. It was the northernmost terminus of EIS until Kifissia station was reopened on 10 August 1958. The station has two passenger platforms and a reversing siding.

== Station Layout ==
G
Side platform
Westbound
← towards Piraeus (Nea Ionia)
Eastbound
towards Kifissia (Eirini) →
Side platform
- Customer service
- Tickets
- Entry/Exit
B1
Subway
Underpass between platforms
