= Attiki metro station =

Athens Metro station

Αττική Attiki
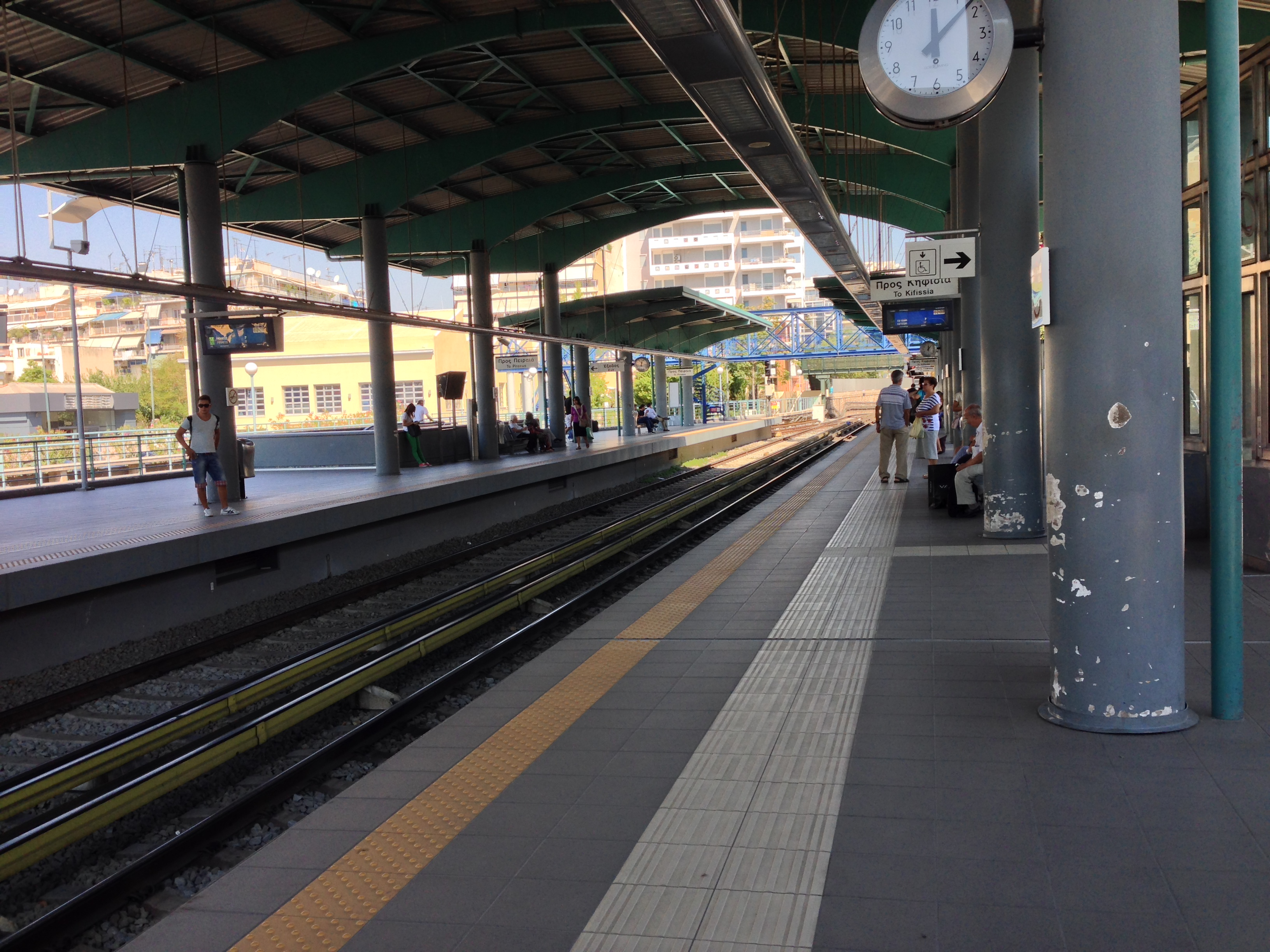
- Line 1 platforms

General information
- Location: Liosion; 104 46 Athens; Greece
- Coordinates: 37.999495°N 23.722800°E
- Manager: STASY
- Line: Athens Metro Line 1 Athens Metro Line 2
- Platforms: 4
- Tracks: 4

Construction
- Structure type: At-grade (Line 1); Underground (Line 2)
- Platform levels: 2
- Accessible: Yes

Key dates
- 30 June 1949: Line 1 station opened
- 28 January 2000: Line 2 station opened
- 15 March 2004: Line 1 station rebuilt

Services
Preceding station	Athens Metro	Following station
Victoria towards Piraeus	Line 1	Agios Nikolaos towards Kifissia
Sepolia towards Anthoupoli	Line 2	Larissa Station towards Elliniko
Former services
Preceding station	Former railways	Following station
Lavrion Square Terminus	Lavrion Square–Strofyli Railway	Kato Patisia towards Strofyli
Lavrion Square Terminus	Athens–Lavrion Railway	Kato Patisia towards Kalogreza or Lavrion
Location

Attiki (Greek: Αττική) is a metro station in Athens, Greece. The station opened in 1885. It was the main hub of Attica Railways, a metre gauge network connecting downtown Athens with the mining town of Lavrion and the northern suburbs of Marousi and Kifissia. Lavrion trains were diverted to the SPAP line in 1929 and passenger services to Kifissia were suspended in 1938.

In 1949 the station was converted by the Hellenic Electric Railways to standard gauge, and became the northern terminus of the then-Electric Railway until 1956, when further northern extensions towards Kifissia opened. Two underground platforms were added in 2000 for Athens Metro Line 2 trains. The station entrance and the Line 1 platforms were renovated extensively in 2003–2004.

Part of the old station is used as a trolleybus garage by OSY.

Today the station is served by STASY. There are train storage and a service connection between the Line 1 and Line 2.

== Station layout ==
G
Side platform
Southbound
← towards Piraeus (Victoria)
Northbound
towards Kifissia (Agios Nikolaos) →
Side platform
Street level
Entry/Exit
B1
Concourse
- Customer service
- Tickets
B2
Side platform
Southbound
← towards Elliniko (Larissa Station)
Northbound
towards Anthoupoli (Sepolia) →
Side platform

== See also ==
- Lavrion Square-Strofyli railway
- Athens–Lavrion Railway
