= Eirini metro station =

Athens Metro station

Ειρήνη Irini
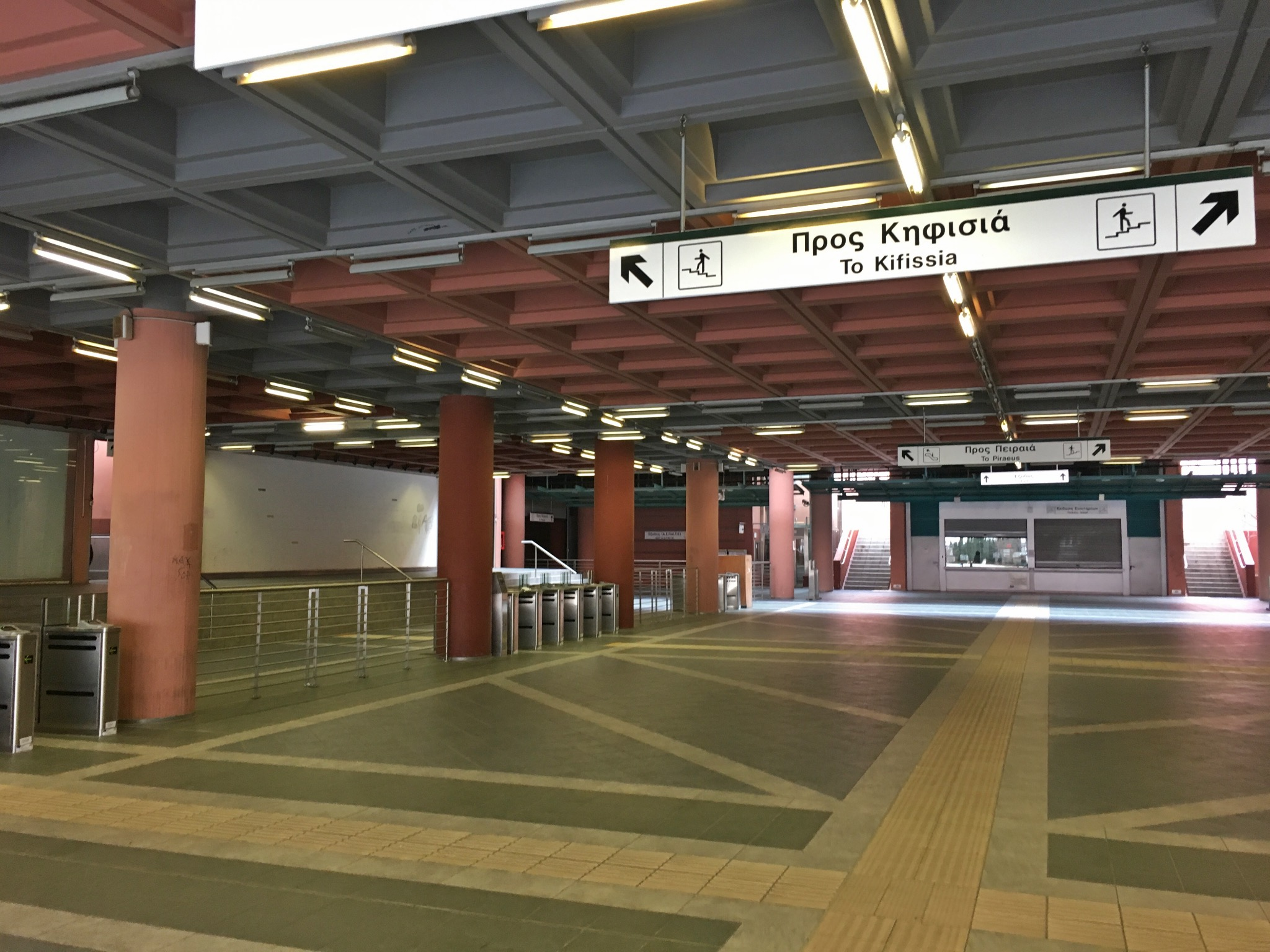
- Station vestibule

General information
- Location: 151 22 Marousi; Greece
- Coordinates: 38.043280°N 23.783310°E
- Manager: STASY
- Line: Athens Metro Line 1
- Platforms: 3 (Spanish solution)
- Tracks: 3

Construction
- Structure type: Elevated
- Accessible: Yes

Key dates
- 10 August 1957: Line opened
- 3 September 1982: Station opened
- 20 July 2004: Station rebuilt

Services
Preceding station	Athens Metro	Following station
Irakleio towards Piraeus	Line 1	Nerantziotissa towards Kifissia
Location

Eirini (Greek: Ειρήνη), also known as Irini on signage, is a station on Line 1 of the Athens Metro. It is adjacent to the Athens Olympic Sports Complex in Marousi, a northern suburb of Athens, Greece, 20.850 kilometres (12.956 mi) from the starting point of the line at Piraeus. It opened on 3 September 1982 and was renovated in 2004.

== Station layout ==
G
Westbound
← towards Piraeus (Irakleio)
Island platform
Eastbound
towards Kifissia (Nerantziotissa) →
Island platform
Inbound track
Platform for alighting only (peak hours only)
B1
Subway
- Customer service
- Tickets
- Entry/Exit
- Stadium
