= Agios Antonios metro station =

Athens Metro station

Άγιος Αντώνιος Aghios Antonios
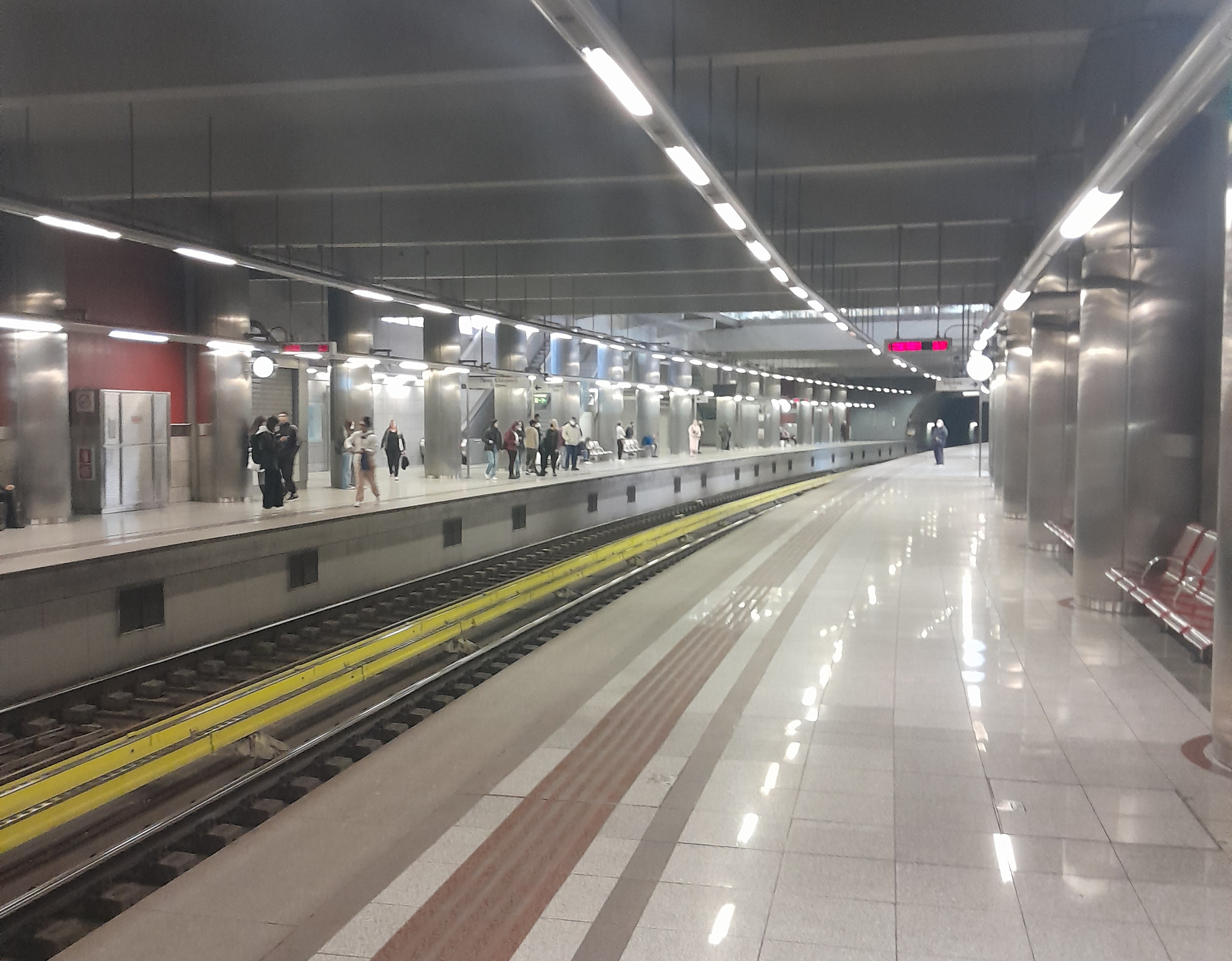
- Station platforms

General information
- Location: Panagi Tsaldari; 121 32 Peristeri; Greece
- Coordinates: 38°00′22″N 23°41′59″E
- Manager: STASY
- Line: Athens Metro Line 2
- Platforms: 2
- Tracks: 2

Construction
- Structure type: Underground
- Accessible: Yes

Key dates
- 9 August 2004: Opened

Services
Preceding station	Athens Metro	Following station
Peristeri towards Anthoupoli	Line 2	Sepolia towards Elliniko
Location

Agios Antonios (Greek: Άγιος Αντώνιος, lit. 'Saint Anthony'), also known as Aghios Antonios on signage, is a subway (metro) station of the Athens Metro. It started operating in August 2004.

It took its name from a nearby Christian Orthodox church dedicated to Saint Anthony. This station is in Peristeri, the biggest municipality of west Athens area. It was the first station in the area and has reduced traffic problems in Peristeri.

== Layout ==
The station of Agios Antonios has two exits, one to the right side of Panagi Tsaldari Ave and the other to the left side.

=== Surrounding landmarks ===
In front of the station is Panagi Tsaldari Avenue, one of the important avenues of Peristeri, which links west Athens with Kifissou Avenue (to Piraeus harbor, southern and northern suburbs of city and National Road 1 to Lamia, Larisa, Thessaloniki, generally North Greece and Balkans) and city center. Buses, trolleybuses and taxis pass regularly toward Athens center, Agioi Anargyroi, Ilion, Petroupolis, Chaidari, Egaleo etc.

== Station layout ==
G Ground	-	Exits
C Concourse	Concourse	Customer Service, Tickets
P Platforms	Side platform, doors will open on the right
P Platforms	Platform 1	← towards Anthoupoli (Peristeri)
P Platforms	Platform 2	→ towards Elliniko (Sepolia) →
P Platforms	Side platform, doors will open on the right
