= Athens Metro =

Rapid transit railway in Athens, Greece

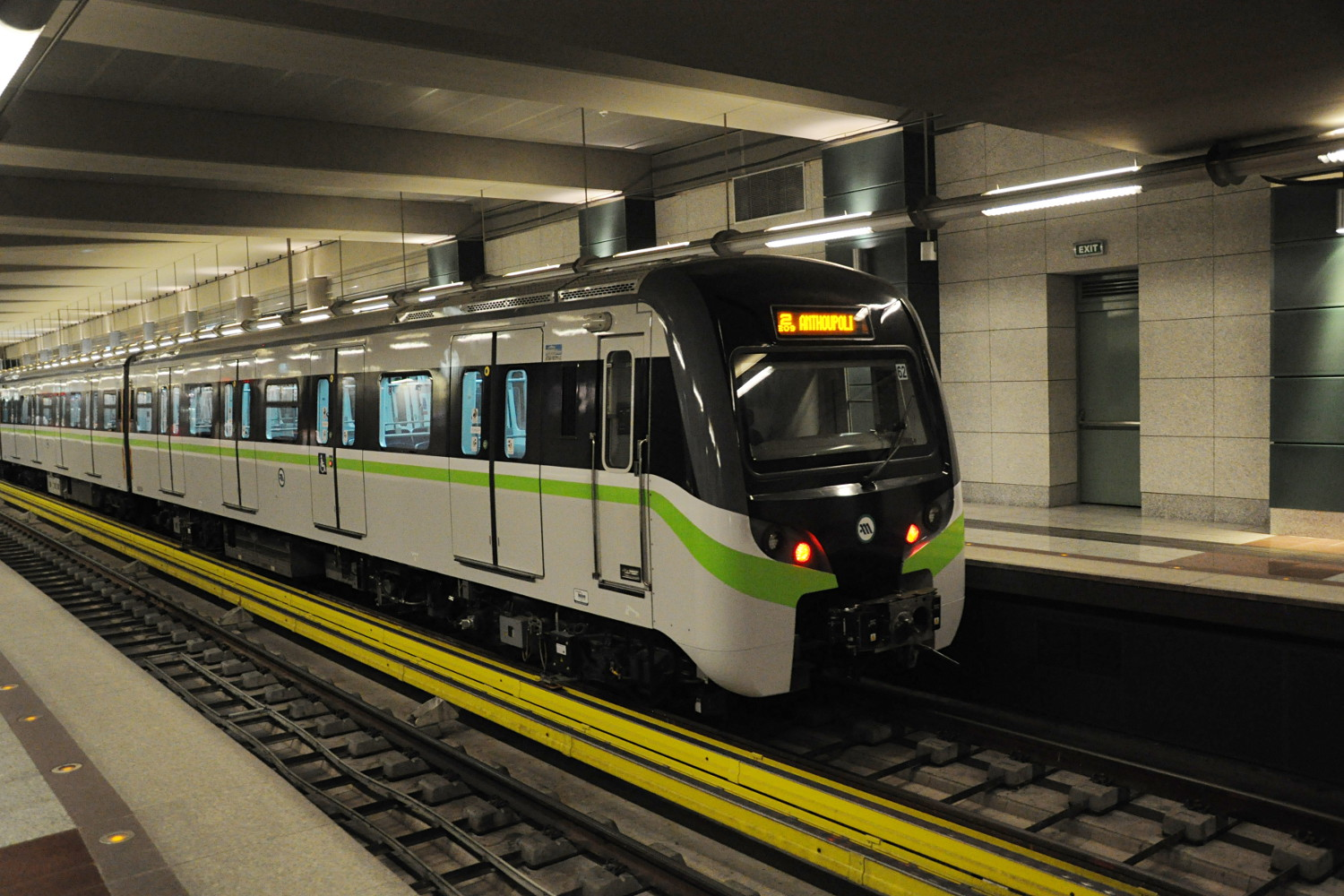
- Athens Metro train at Anthoupoli

Overview
- Native name: Μετρό Αθήνας
- Locale: Greater Athens
- Transit type: Rapid transit
- Number of lines: 3 (Note: 3 lines are in operation, with 1 line Line 4 under construction.)
- Number of stations: 66 served (62 owned) (Note: For a list of stations that the Athens Metro serves, see List of Athens Metro stations.)
- Daily ridership: 1,353,000
- Annual ridership: 493,800,000 (2013)
- Website: Official website

Operation
- Began operation: 27 February 1869 (157 years ago) as a steam railway; 16 September 1904 (122 years ago) as a metro
- Operator: STASY
- Number of vehicles: 108

Technical
- System length: 91.7 km (57.0 mi) (Note: Including 20.7 km (12.9 mi) of mixed use suburban rail.)
- Track gauge: 1,435 mm (4 ft 8 1/2 in) standard gauge
- Electrification: 750 V DC third rail; 25 kV 50 Hz AC overhead (Note: Between Doukissis Plakentias and Athens Airport.)
- Top speed: 80 km/h (50 mph)
System map
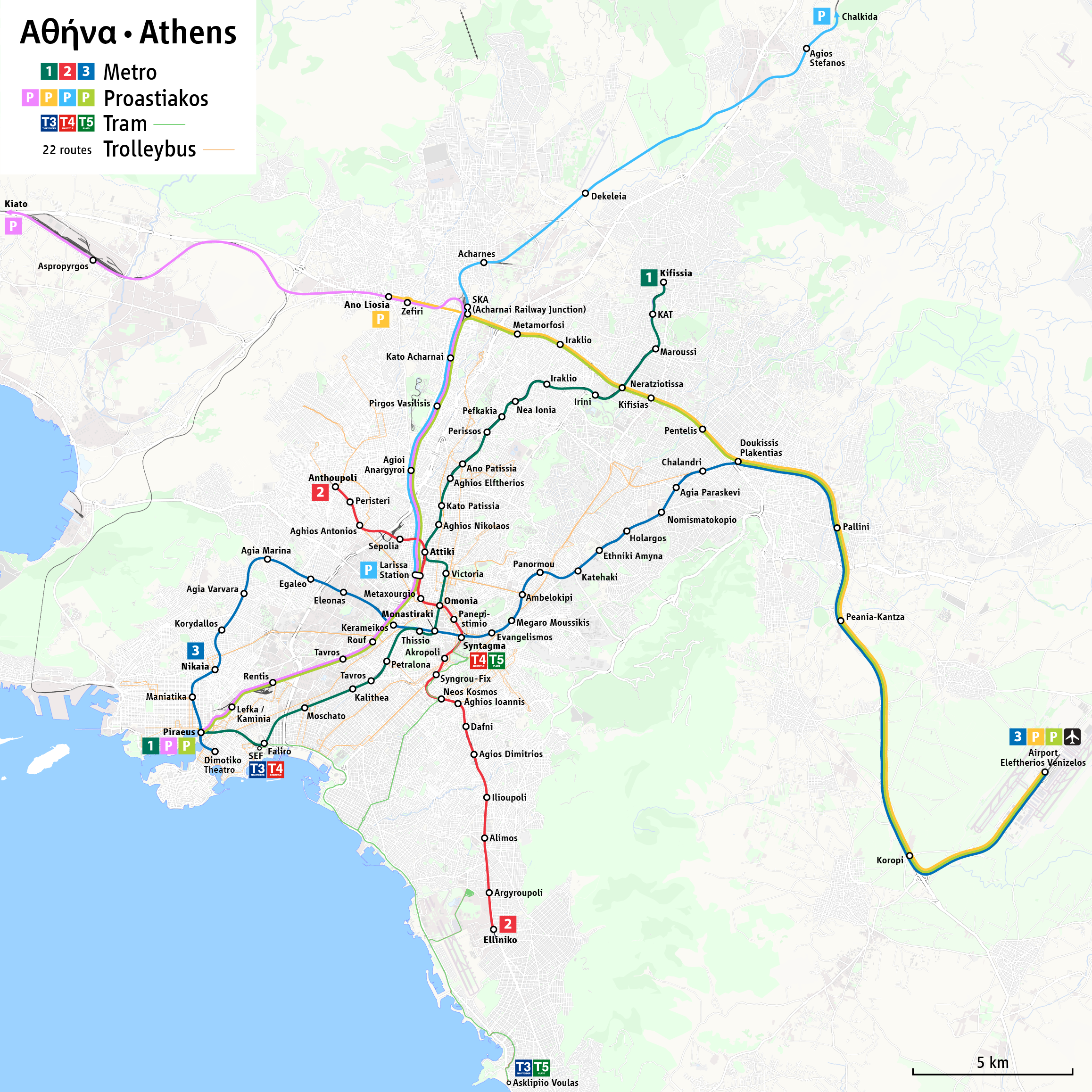

The Athens Metro (Greek: Μετρό Αθήνας, romanized: Metro Athinas) is a rapid transit system serving the Athens urban area in Greece. Line 1 opened as a single-track conventional steam railway in 1869 and was electrified in 1904. Beginning in 1991, Elliniko Metro S.A. constructed and extended Lines 2 and 3. It has significantly changed Athens by providing a much-needed solution to the city's traffic and air pollution problem, as well as revitalising many of the areas it serves. Extensions of existing lines are under development or tender, like the Line 2 extension to Ilion where tender started in 2023, as well as a new Line 4, whose central section began construction in August 2021.

The Athens Metro is actively connected with the other means of public transport, such as buses, trolleys, the Athens Tram and the Athens Suburban Railway. The Athens Metro is hailed for its modernity (mainly the newer lines 2, 3), and many of its stations feature works of art, exhibitions and displays of the archaeological remains found during its construction. Photography and video-taking is permitted across the whole network and street photographers often work in Athens Metro. This was the only metro system in Greece, before the Thessaloniki Metro began operations on 30 November 2024.

== History ==
=== Piraeus–Kifissia Railway (Line 1) ===
Until 28 January 2000, Line 1 was the only rapid-transit line in Athens. The Athens and Piraeus Railway Company (SAP) opened a steam single-track mixed cargo and passenger railway line on 27 February 1869 and was run between Piraeus and Thiseio. It was electrified in 1904. On 4 February 1885 Lavrion Square-Strofyli steam narrow gauge single-track mixed cargo and passenger railway line opened and was run at the time from Attiki Square to Kifissia through Iraklio. These originally mixed cargo and passenger railway lines gradually merged and converted to a rapid-transit system. The section between Kifissia and Strofyli was abandoned.

From 1869 to 1926 the line was operated by SAP. From 1926 to 1976 the line was operated by Hellenic Electric Railways (EIS). In 1976 the EIS was nationalized and renamed Athens-Piraeus Electric Railway Company (ISAP), which continued to operate what became line 1 of the Athens Metro until 16 June 2011.

=== 1990s projects ===
Since the current Line 1 opened, the government has proposed many expansions to the subway network, including a 1963 plan for a fourteen-line subway network. Construction of Lines 2 and 3 began in November 1992 to decrease traffic congestion and improve Athens' air quality by reducing its smog level. Both lines were constructed underground. Lines 2 and 3, built by Attiko Metro S.A. and operated until 2011 by Attiko Metro Operations Company, are known respectively as the red and blue lines and were inaugurated in January 2000. Line 3 was extended to the Eleftherios Venizelos International Airport in summer 2004, and Line 2 was extended to Anthoupoli and Elliniko in 2013.

=== Consolidation ===
Until 17 June 2011, the operational management of the Athens Metro network was similar to that of the London Underground network before the creation of the London Passenger Transport Board and the absorption of the Metropolitan Railway on 1 July 1933. The Greek government attempted to absorb ISAP into Attiko Metro operation company under Law 2669/1998 so the latter would be responsible for the whole network, but this initiative failed. Athens Metro operations were consolidated when the Greek government enacted Law 3920/2011, replacing AMEL, ISAP and Tram S.A. with Urban Rail Transport S.A. (STASY S.A.) (Greek: ΣΤΑΣΥ Α.Ε.), a subsidiary of OASA S.A. (Athens Urban Transport Organisation S.A.).

=== Timeline ===
Line	Segment	Construction Started	Year opened
Athens Metro Line 1	Piraeus - Thiseio	1856	27 February 1869
Athens Metro Line 1	Thiseio - Omonoia	1889	17 May 1895
Athens Metro Line 1	Omonoia - Victoria	January 1928	1 March 1948
Athens Metro Line 1	Victoria - Attiki	January 1928	30 June 1949
Athens Metro Line 1	Petralona (Infill station)	January 1928	22 November 1954
Athens Metro Line 1	Attiki - Ano Patisia	August 1938	12 February 1956
Athens Metro Line 1	Ano Patisia - Nea Ionia	August 1938	14 March 1956
Athens Metro Line 1	Nea Ionia - Irakleio	August 1938	4 March 1957
Athens Metro Line 1	Irakleio - Kifissia	August 1938	10 August 1957
Athens Metro Line 1	Eirini (Infill station)	January 1980	3 September 1982
Athens Metro Line 1	Tavros (Infill station)	1988	6 February 1989
Athens Metro Line 1	KAT (Infill station)	1988	27 March 1989
Athens Metro Line 2	Sepolia - Syntagma	November 1992	28 January 2000
Athens Metro Line 3	Syntagma - Ethniki Amyna	November 1992	28 January 2000
Athens Metro Line 2	Syntagma - Dafni	November 1992	15 November 2000
Athens Metro Line 3	Syntagma - Monastiraki	November 1992	22 April 2003
Athens Metro Line 2	Dafni - Agios Dimitrios	April 2001	5 June 2004
Athens Metro Line 3	Ethniki Amyna - Athens Airport	December 2000	30 July 2004
Athens Metro Line 1	Neratziotissa (Infill station)	February 2002	6 August 2004
Athens Metro Line 2	Sepolia - Agios Antonios	February 2002	9 August 2004
Athens Metro Line 3	Monastiraki - Egaleo	May 2002	26 May 2007
Athens Metro Line 2	Agios Antonios - Anthoupoli	May 2007	6 April 2013
Athens Metro Line 2	Agios Dimitrios - Elliniko	January 2007	26 July 2013
Athens Metro Line 3	Egaleo - Agia Marina	January 2007	14 December 2013
Athens Metro Line 3	Agia Marina - Nikaia	July 2012	7 July 2020
Athens Metro Line 3	Nikaia - Dimotiko Theatro	July 2012	10 October 2022
Athens Metro Line 4	Alsos Veikou - Goudi	August 2021	2032 (proj.)

== Infrastructure ==
=== Lines and stations ===
The Athens Metro consists of three lines totalling 91.7 kilometres (57.0 miles) and 66 stations: Line 1 (Green) is 25.7 kilometres (16.0 miles) long with 24 stations, Line 2 (Red) is 18.7 kilometres (11.6 miles) long with 20 stations, and Line 3 (Blue) is 47.3 kilometres (29.4 mi) long with 24 stations. STASY owns and operates 62 of the 66 stations: three other stations (Pallini, Paiania–Kantza and Koropi) belong to GAIAOSE and the Athens Airport station belongs to the operator of the Athens International Airport.

The system has five interchanges, at Attiki, Monastiraki, Omonia, Piraeus and Syntagma, allowing all three to interchange with each other at least once. Each line also has at least one connection with the Athens Suburban Railway, and the Athens Tram.

Outline of Athens Metro lines
Line	Map colour (Note: None of the organisations behind the construction or operation of the Athens Metro specify the exact line colour values for web or print, but they agree on a general colour scheme for identifying lines.)	Opened	Last extension	Type	Stations	Length	Termini	Ref.
Athens Metro Line 1	Green	27 February 1869	10 August 1957(Last station on existing line opened 6 August 2004)	At-grade Sub-surface (Monastiraki - Attiki)	24	25.7 km (16.0 mi)	Piraeus; Kifissia	
Athens Metro Line 2	Red	28 January 2000	26 July 2013	Deep level	20	18.7 km (11.6 mi)	Anthoupoli; Elliniko	
Athens Metro Line 3	Blue	28 January 2000	10 October 2022	Deep level At-grade (Doukissis Plakentias - Athens Airport)	27	47.3 km (29.4 mi)	Dimotiko Theatro; Doukissis Plakentias; Athens Airport	
Total:					66 (Note: There are 66 stations after counting interchange stations once. Otherwise, there would be 71.)	91.7 km (57.0 mi)		

Line 2 is entirely underground. Line 1 is mostly overground, with an underground section spanning between the Monastiraki and Attiki stations, and an additional underground station (Kato Patisia) in central Athens. Line 3 is mostly underground; Trains that run an overground route are only those with the airport as final destination. The overground section of Line 3, east of the tunnel portal near Doukissis Plakentias, is open. In the tunnel sections up and down lines share a common tunnel, except for approaches to stations with an island platform (such as Egaleo). Train maintenance facilities are located at Attiki, Faliro, Irini, Piraeus, Kifissia and Thissio for Line 1, and Doukissis Plakentias, Eleonas and Sepolia for Lines 2 and 3.

The Athens Metro's three lines carried approximately 1,353,000 passengers daily in 2010.

A network map of the Athens Metro system, that includes the three current lines, the under construction line 4, the tramway, the suburban railway and all the future under design extensions.

== Rolling stock ==
The network uses standard gauge electric trains which in most places run on 750 V DC third rail, but the section of Line 3 running to the airport requires trains which can use overhead lines of 25 kV AC, 50 Hz.

The Athens Metro classifies rolling stock by "batch" for Line 1 and "generation" for Lines 2 and 3 because ISAP and AMEL used different classification systems for rolling stock before consolidation. Six types of rolling stock operate on the network, all equipped with third rail current collection systems; however, only seven second-generation trains have the necessary overhead line equipment to serve Line 3 from Doukissis Plakentias to Athens Airport.

The eighth batch (introduced in 1983) is the oldest rolling stock in passenger service, while the third generation (introduced in 2013) is the latest rolling stock in passenger service. The eighth- and tenth-batch stock is externally similar, but the former has split-flap headsigns in Johnston typeface and a cream-and-green interior colour scheme. An extensive refurbishment programme is in progress for the 8th batch (as of 2023), and to cover for trains undergoing refurbishment, up to five 1st generation Line 2/3 trains have been borrowed to operate on Line 1.

Line 1 halfsets have driving cabs at both ends, unlike the Line 2/3 halfsets which have a driving cab at the outer ends, but only basic driving apparatus for shunting purposes only at the inner ends; thus, they can only operate on their own inside depots.

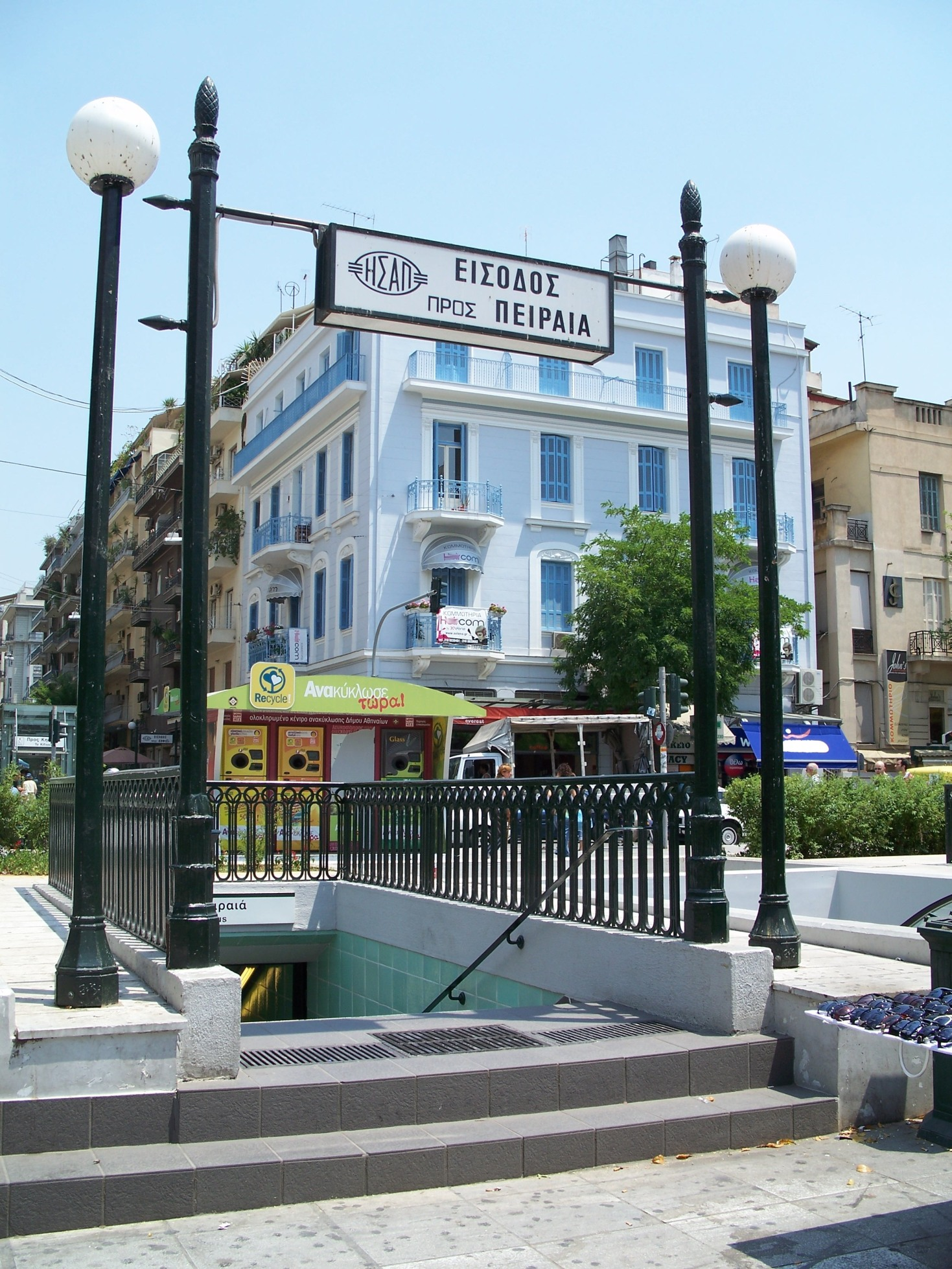
The west entrance to Athens Metro line 1 Victoria station.

=== Line 1 ===
Name	Manufacturer	Image	Lines	Number of Coaches per Trainset	Number of Doors per Side	Passengers	In service since	About
8th Batch	MAN SE, Siemens Mobility	8th Batch trainset at Kifisia (2009)		5	4	830	1983–1985	The 8th batch, also known as Columbia, from the well-known space shuttle is the oldest of the series of trainsets that runs on the Athens Metro network. As of 2023, 14 trainsets is under upgrade.
10th Batch	MAN SE, AEG, Siemens Mobility, Hellenic Shipyards Co.	10th Batch trainset at Piraeus (2011)		5	4	830	1993–1995	The 10th batch is the second oldest range of wagons that runs on the Athens Metro network. They are identical in appearance with the 8th batch and known by the same nickname. An upgrade of the train is anticipated.
11th Batch	Adtranz, Siemens Mobility, Hellenic Shipyards Co., Bombardier Transportation	11th Batch trainset at Neratziotissa (2007)		6	4	1002	2000–2004	The 11th batch was the only batch of Line 1 of the Athens Metro which has 6 coaches, before 1st generation trains of the Lines 2 and 3 enter service on Line 1. An upgrade of the trains is anticipated.
1st Generation	Siemens Mobility, Daimler-Benz, Alsthοm			6	4	1,030	2000	The 1st generation is the oldest batch of 2 and 3 line trainsets and the only one in the whole network with sliding doors and not locking doors. Some first generation trains are also used on line 1.

=== Lines 2 & 3 ===
Name	Manufacturer	Image	Lines	Number of Coaches per Trainset	Number of Doors per side	Speed (km/h)	Passengers	Units	In operation since	About
1st Generation	Siemens Mobility, Daimler-Benz, Alsthοm			6	4	80	1,030	28	2000	The 1st generation is the oldest batch of 2 and 3 line trainsets and the only one in the whole network with sliding doors and not locking doors. Some first generation trains are also used on line 1.
2nd Generation	Hanwha-Rotem, Mitsubishi Vapor, Knorr-Bremse			6	4	80 (DC); 120 (DC/AC)	1,062 (DC); 1,026 (DC/AC)	21 (7 DC/AC & 14 DC)	2003	The second generation operates under the standard line voltage of 750 V DC from third rail, but 7 trains from line 3 are able to operate under 25 kV 50 Hz AC from overhead catenary with a pantograph in order to serve the section from Doukissis Plakentias to the Airport.
3rd Generation	Hyundai Rotem, Siemens Mobility			6	4	80	1.032	28	2014	The 3rd generation is the latest model of trainsets running on the Athens Metro network.

=== Signalling ===
Line 1 uses two-aspect red/green home signals, yellow/green distant signals and a passenger information system (PIS). The current system replaced 1950s-era semaphore signals. The automatic train protection (ATP) system of Line 1 was fully installed in 2023 which replaced the previous Indusi system.

Lines 2 and 3 use the Alstom automatic train supervision system (ATS) and a passenger information system (PIS). Two-aspect red/white colour signals are used at points and junctions only.

== Fares ==
Fares are prepaid, either as short term tickets valid for 90 minutes, 24 hours, three days, five days, or as long term tickets. As of September 2020, there are two types of fare products, the ATH.ENA Ticket and ATH.ENA Card, both of which are validated using a contactless system (by scanning the ticket or card at the electronic validating machines). The tickets are valid on all modes of public transport in Athens except on trains and buses to the airport. Passengers cannot buy a fare on board the bus. To travel to or from the airport, passengers may buy a one-way ticket for €9 or a 3-day ticket for €20 which also includes unlimited local trips and a return trip to the airport. Arrival at the airport without having paid the appropriate fare will incur a €72 fine, reduced to €36 if paid within 10 days. Term tickets are available in 30, 90, 180, and 365 day periods and are available only with a personalized ATH.ENA Card. Reduced fares are available for university students, seniors, disabled and persons under 18. During a fare control the passengers that are entitled to a reduced fare have to show ID card, student card or passport. Children under the age of 6 are entitled to travel for free with all means of transportation. On buses and trams the ticket or card must be validated only when entering the vehicle/car by scanning the ticket at the electronic validating machines. At metro or Suburban Railway stations, the ticket or card must be validated at the electronic gates when entering and exiting the station.

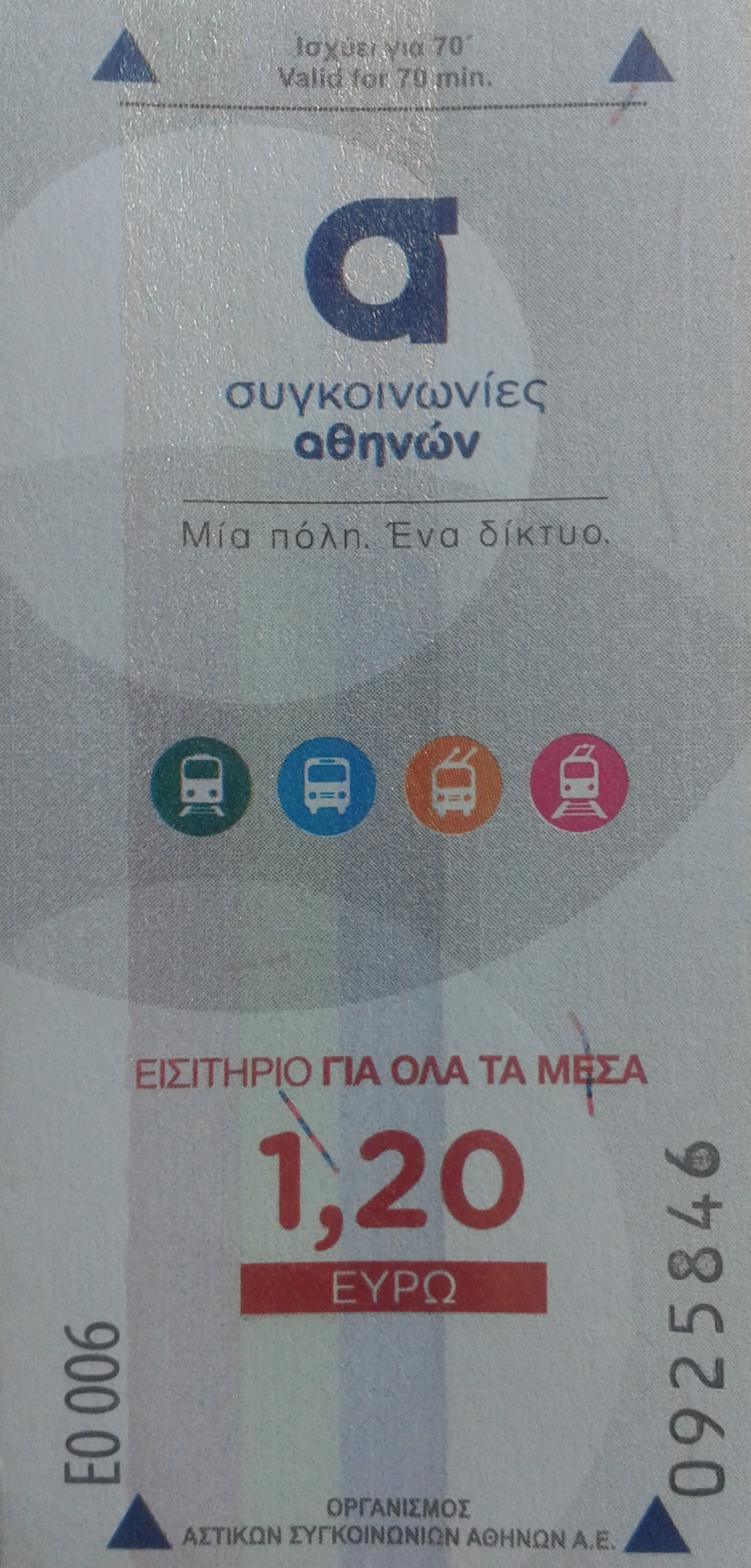
Old €1.20 (standard fee) paper Ticket, in use from September 2014 until November 2017.

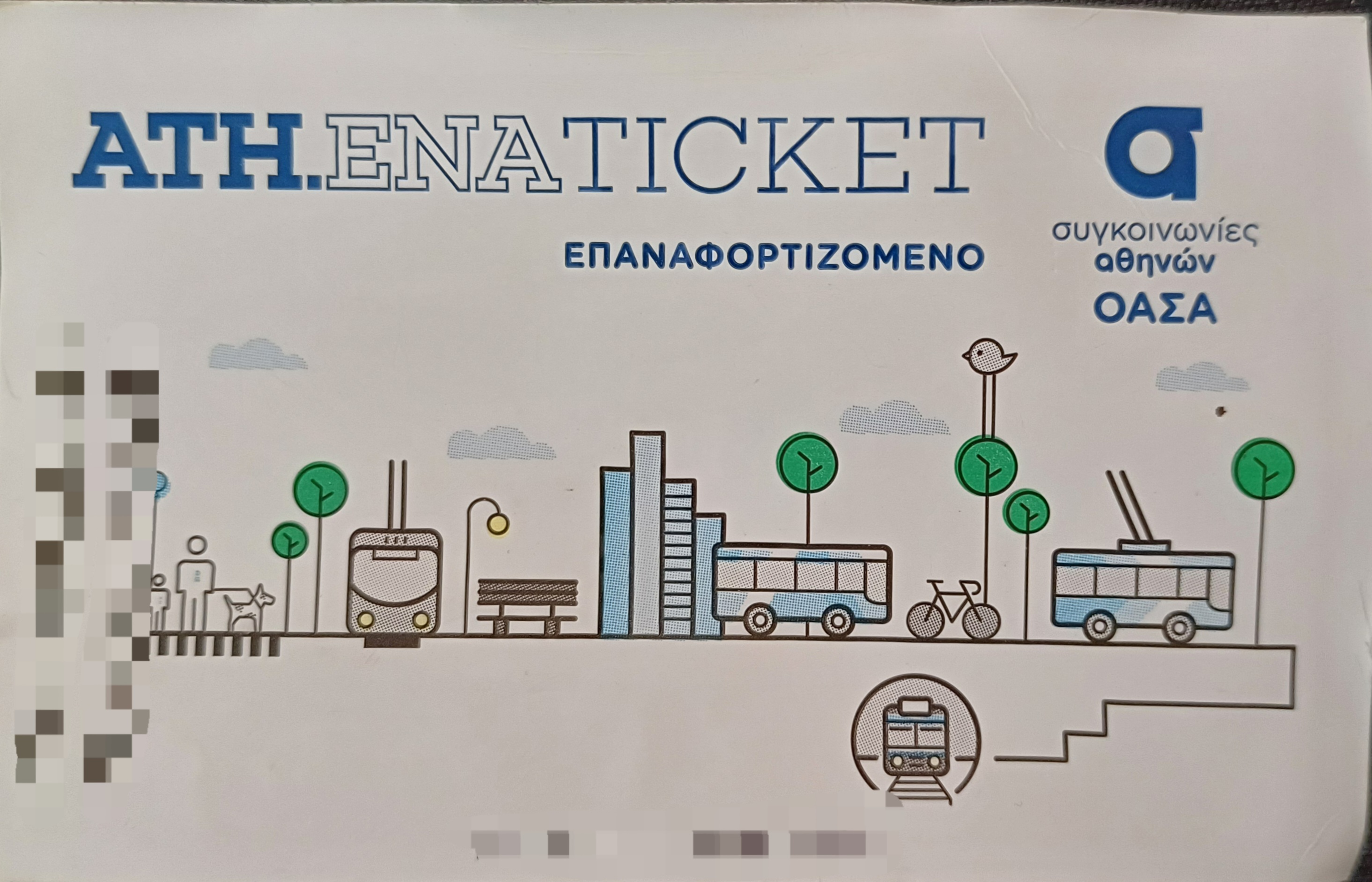
New ticket €1.20 paper ticket in use from November 2017 - present

== Archaeological excavations and exhibits ==
During construction of the metro tunnels, artifacts of archaeological interest were discovered and rescue archaeology was employed. Teams of archaeologists worked ahead of, then with, engineers for six years, protecting and recording archaeological finds (streets, houses, cemeteries, sanctuaries, public workshops, foundry pits, kilns, aqueducts, wells, cisterns, drains and sewage tunnels). This afforded new insight into the city's ancient topography, through unprecedented infrastructure development combined with the study and preservation of archaeological data. Exhibitions of ancient artifacts or replicas are found at a number of metro stations, including Monastiraki, Akropoli and Syntagma.

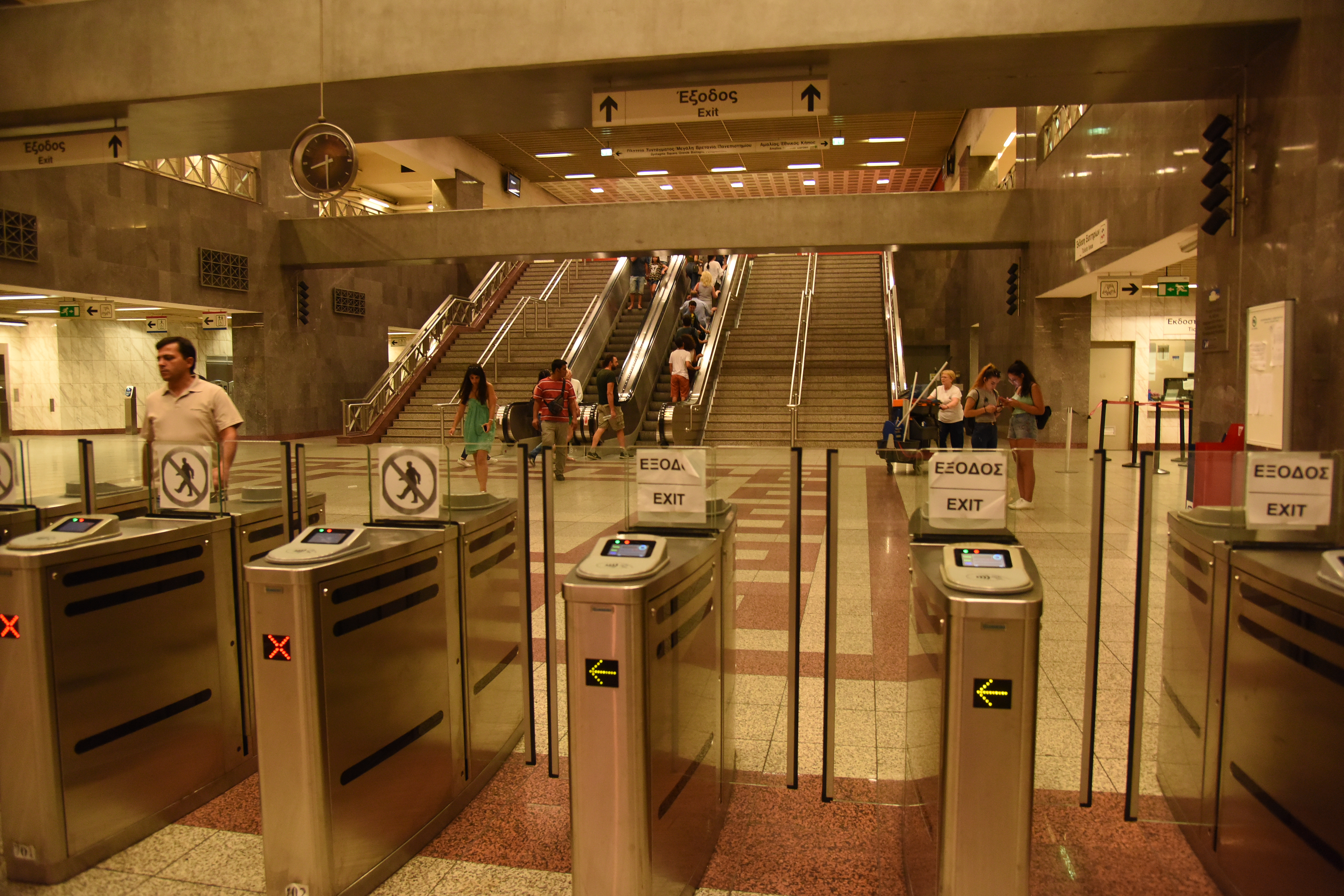
Concourse level of Syntagma Metro station (2018).

== Future ==
The Athens Metro masterplan, as presented in October 2022, consists of the following projects:

Line	Segment	Length	Stations
Athens Metro Line 1	Petralona - SNFCC	4.1 km (2.5 mi)	4
Athens Metro Line 1	KAT - Komvos Varympompis	4.4 km (2.7 mi)	3*
Athens Metro Line 2	Anthoupoli - Agios Nikolaos	4 km (2.5 mi)	3
Athens Metro Line 2	Agios Nikolaos - Acharnes	5.5 km (3.4 mi)	3
Athens Metro Line 2	Elliniko - Glyfada	3.6 km (2.2 mi)	3
Athens Metro Line 4	Goudi - Lykovrysi	12.1 km (7.5 mi)	10
Athens Metro Line 4	Alsos Veikou - Petroupoli	6.8 km (4.2 mi)	6
**	Evangelismos - Dafni	3.4 km (2.1 mi)	3
		43.9 km	35

*The current Kifissia terminus station will be demolished and rebuilt as an underground station.

**The 2022 Development Plan refers it as Line 4 branch but new plans integrate it in a future Line 5.

If and when these projects are completed, the Athens Metro is expected to reach 141.7 km (88.0 mi) in length and serve a total of 110 stations by 2040.

In April 2026, OASA unveiled a new map of the network that would reach 455 km serving 274 stations, including the suburban trains. Besides the extensions of Line 1 and Line 2, and the ongoing and planned Line 4, a circular Line 5 (purple) and a peripheral Line 6 (pale blue) were proposed.

=== Line 4 ===
A fourth line is planned for the Athens Metro and it has been incorporated in the roadmap for the development and expansion of public transport in Athens since 2005. The new line in its totality will extend over a length of 38.2 km (23.7 mi), adding thirty five (35) new stations to the Athens Metro system. The cost of the entire project is estimated at 3.3 billion EUR. The recommendation is for lighter rolling stock than the type used in existing lines of Athens Metro which would operate automatically without a driver. In November 2020, Alstom was chosen to supply the line with 20 4-car automated Metropolis trains, operated under Urbalis 400 signalling system.

The first phase of Line 4 will be between Alsos Veikou and Goudi stations, predicting fifteen (15) new stations and a length of 12.8 km (8.0 mi) of new track. An invitation to tender for the construction of the first phase of Line 4 was issued in September 2018. The construction started in mid to late-2021 and is scheduled to be completed in 2029 or 2030. The estimated cost for constructing the first phase of the new line is 1.51 billion EUR. Currently, the project of the first phase is considered to follow a PPP scheme which might be extended for constructing the whole new line. An alternative solution is a mixed funding between the EIB and the Greek State. It is also a high-profile candidate project to be included in the Juncker Plan of EU that will include also the second phase of Line 4 of Athens Metro.

The European Investment Bank is allocating a €730 million loan over 30 years to finance the building of the first segment of the Line 4 metro, which will connect Alsos Veikou and Goudi. The initiative will also assist Athens by reducing the number of private automobiles on the road by 53 000, resulting in 318 tonnes less carbon dioxide emissions daily.

=== Long-term plan ===
==== Line 1 ====
Since 2020 the northern extension has been decided to consist of an underground part (including a new underground Kifissia station) and the initial extension until Nea Erythrea, with the stations between Agios Stefanos and Nea Erythrea utilising the Suburban railways of OSE, with a further extension towards Varympompi Junction.

Station	Municipality	Interchanges and notes
Kifissia	Kifissia	New underground station
ΑΟΚ	Kifissia	
Nea Erithrea	Nea Erithrea	
Varympompi Jct	Acharnes	On A1 Motorway

When the topographical survey was done it was decided that for the Southern Extension there would be an underground diversion from the station of Thiseio branching out to 3,5 km consisting of 4 stations: Ano Petralona, Plateia Davaki, Lofos Filaretou ending at Stavros Niarchos Foundation Cultural Center near Delta Falirou.

Station	Municipality	Interchanges and notes
Ano Petralona	Athens	
Plateia Davaki	Kallithea	
Lofos Filaretou	Kallithea	
Stavros Niarchos	Kallithea	On Stavros Niarchos Foundation Cultural Center and with possible interchange with Tram at Delta Falirou.

==== Line 2 ====
The northern extension may consist initially of a 4.0 km (2.5 mi) line (Anthoupoli to Agios Nikolaos) in 2031, with intermediate stations at Palatiani and Ilion (for Line 4). With a second phase (Aghios Nikolaos - Acharnai), with intermediate stations at Kamatero and Zefyri (for Athens Suburban Railway trains).

Station	Municipality	Interchanges and notes
Palatiani	Ilion	
Ilion	Ilion	Interchange with Line 4.
Agios Nikolaos	Ilion	"Agios Nikolaos" is a provisional name for a planned station along the eponymous road. Not to be confused Aghios Nikolaos of Line 1
Kamatero	Agioi Anargyroi-Kamatero	
Zefyri	Fyli	Interchange with the Athens Suburban Railway.
Aharnai	Acharnes	The station is known as "Aharnai" according the current plans.

The southern extension may consist of a 4.4 km (2.7 mi) line from Elliniko to Glyfada, with intermediate stations at Ano Glyfada and Grigoriou Lampraki.

Station	Municipality	Interchanges and notes
Ano Glyfada	Glyfada	
Grigoriou Lampraki	Glyfada	"Grigoriou Lampraki" is a provisional name for a planned station at the junction with the eponymous road and Vouliagmenis Avenue.
Glyfada	Glyfada	Interchange with the Athens Tram at Platia Vaso Katraki.

==== "Souflias Plan" ====
On 15 November 2008, Greek newspaper Ta Nea reported that the Greek government was considering a circular line from Ano Ilisia to Faros, via Dafni and Eleonas, as part of a "100 km (62 mi)" network. This proposal evolved to form part of what is now the long-term Athens Metro Future Regulatory Plan (or the Souflias plan) on 13 April 2009, which called for an 220 km (140 mi) network of eight lines and 200 stations.

The Souflias plan was last revised in January 2012, and saw limited activity until October 2020, when Elliniko Metro announced that they were reconsidering some extensions from the plan, including the extension of Line 1 from Kifissia to Nea Erythraia, the extensions of Line 2 to Ano Liosia and Glyfada and Line 6 from Melissia to Perama. In December 2021, a part of the southern branch of Line 6 was reconsidered as a branch of Line 1 from Thiseio to the SNFCC in Kallithea, with intermediate stations at Hamosternas, Plateia Davaki, and Lofos Filaretou.

==== Line 5 (Haidari - Kalamaki) ====
Originally considered by the Souflias plan as line 7, but since the consideration of new branches for line 4 it has been reappeared and been renamed to line 5 and its part from Akadimia to Evangelismos being considered as an part of Line 4 with the lines splitting in Evangelismos, the line 4 part continuing until Goudi and the Line 5 one until Kalamaki.

==== Circular Line 5 ====
In April 2026, a new map was presented, where the plan for an Evangelismos-Ano Ilioupoli branch of line 4 would be abandoned. Instead, a Circular Line 5 (purple) would serve the new Government Park among the forecast 21-23 stations by 2045. This line would connect with Line 3 at Ambelokipi, connect with Line 4 at Kaisariani, connect with Line 2 at Agios Dimitrios, connect with the tram at Nea Smyrni Square, connect with Line 1 both on the new south extension at Davaki and on the historical branch at Kallithea, connect to the suburban network at Rouf, connect to Line 3 at Agia Marina, connect to Line 2 and suburban and intercity trains at Larissa station, connect to Line 1 at Victoria, and with Line 4 at Alexandras.

==== Peripheral Line 6 ====
Along with the Circular Line 5, the idea of a peripheral line 6 was disclosed in April 2026. This semi-circular line would join the two existing stations of Line 3, Egaleo and Katehaki through the northern suburbs, via Peristeri, Agioi Anargyroi, Agios Eleftherios, Galatsi, Ano Kypseli and Neo Psychiko.

== See also ==
- List of Athens Metro stations
- Transport for Athens
  - STASY, the operator of the metro
- Thessaloniki Metro, the other metro system in Greece
- List of metro systems
- Transport in Greece
