= Athens–Lavrion Railway =

Railway line in Attica, Greece (1885–1957)

- Attica Railways Locomotive Γ10

Overview
- Native name: Σιδηροδρομική Γραμμή Λαυρίου - Αγίων Αναργύρων
- Status: Closed
- Locale: Attica, Greece
- Termini: Athens; Lavrion

Service
- Rolling stock: Basileiades; Krauss-Maffei; MAN/Uerdingen (1952); De Dietrich Ferroviaire (1952)
- Ridership: 239,740 (1926)

History
- Commenced: 1882
- Opened: 20 June 1885
- Completed: 1885
- Purchased: 1910
- Closed: 1957 for passengers 1962 for commercial

Technical
- Line length: 76 km (47 mi)
- Track gauge: 1,000 mm (3 ft 3 3/8 in)
- Operating speed: 35 km/h (22 mph)
Route map
until 1926

Athens–Lavrion Railway (Σιδηροδρομική Γραμμή Λαυρίου - Αγίων Αναργύρων) was a 1,000 mm (3 ft 3 3/8 in) metre gauge railway line connecting downtown Athens with Eastern Attica and the mining town of Lavrion in Greece.

== Attica Railways (1882–1926) ==
The contract between the Greek government and the Hellenic Company of Lavrion Metallurgies was signed in 1882. The line would be 76 kilometres (47 mi) long, with a branch line from Heraklion to Kifissia. A new private company, Attica Railways (Greek: Σιδηρόδρομοι Αττικής), was founded to take over the new line.

The line from Attiki (Note: A location in Athens formerly called Kassida and promptly renamed Attica (Attiki, Greek: Αττική) after the railway, even today called Attica Square, not to be confused with the Attica Region served by the line.) to Kifissia (a northern suburb) was opened on 2 February 1885 and was later extended further north to Strofyli. The main line to Lavrion was officially opened on 20 June 1885, although the section Keratea–Lavrion was in limited use before that date.

In 1889 the line was extended by 2 kilometres (1.2 mi) towards the center of Athens, to a station located at Lavrion Square, near Omonoia Square. The section between Lavrion Square and Attica remained in use until 1926, when it was replaced by a tram line.

The section from Athens (Lavrion Square) to Heraklion was 9.2 kilometres (5.7 mi) long, 56.8 kilometres (35.3 mi) from Heraklion to Lavrion, and 7.4 kilometres (4.6 mi) between Heraklion and Strofyli. All sections were single track, with passing loops at most stations.

The main rolling stock depot and repair workshop were located at Attiki station, with additional facilities at Lavrion.

A short (273 metres (299 yd)), single-track spur branched off at a junction located one kilometre (1,100 yd) beyond Heraklion station, followed by a 90° right curve and ending at Kalogreza or Nea Alexandreia station. The branch line was constructed in or just after 1944 and served the local brown coal (lignite) mines of Kalogreza. It was closed in 1957, sharing the fate of Athens–Lavrion railway. There are no visible traces of the tracks left. Another branch line served Cambas Winery at Leontarion (Kantza). In the Lavrion mining area the line connected with the industrial networks of the two mining companies.

In 1910 Attica Railways were taken over by the Hellenic Electric Railways company.

=== Rolling stock ===
A Tubize locomotive with an Athens–Lavrion train at Thorikon bridge (1888)

The passenger service to Lavrion consisted of two trains in each direction per day. The trains were hauled by Tubize 0-6-2T steam locomotives, delivered between 1885 and 1889. Between 1900 and 1925 ten 2-6-0T locomotives were procured in four batches: one from Vassiliadis Works in Piraeus, and the remaining nine from Krauss in Germany. Two additional Tubize 0-6-2T locomotives were bought from Thessaly Railways in 1919 and were converted to 2-6-2T.

== Part of Piraeus, Athens and Peloponnese Railways (1929–1962) ==
In 1926 the lines to Lavrion and Kifissia was taken over by the Electric Transport Company, a member of Power and Traction Finance Company. In 1929 the line from Heraklion to Lavrion was transferred to the Piraeus, Athens and Peloponnese Railways (SPAP).

Under SPAP operation service to Lavrion departed from Athens Peloponnese Station. SPAP trains initially used the Attiki to Heraklion section without stopping at intermediate stations until 1931, when SPAP constructed a line from the station of Kato Liossia (later Agioi Anargyroi) to Heraklion. Between 1929 and 1931 SPAP trains would access the Lavrion line at Attiki station using a temporary short connection crossing the standard gauge line north of Athens Central ("Larissis") station.

SPAP took possession of the ten 2-6-0T (Vassiliadis/Krauss) locomotives while the remaining ones were used by IEM for the Attiki–Kifissia–Strofyli service.

In 1944 the line was damaged and wasn't reopened until 1952, with three trains in each direction on weekdays and an extra passenger train on weekends. Service was provided by Uerdingen/MAN railbuses. Freight trains still used steam traction.

The line was closed to passenger traffic in 1957, due to political lobbying by private bus owners. Limited freight and special passenger trains ran for a few more years. In 1962 the connection between Kato Liosia and Heraklion was severed due to the construction of the new Athens–Thessaloniki highway and the line was abandoned.

== Preservation ==
Small sections of the line survive at various locations. Museum railways of Attica Co. (Greek: Εταιρεία Μουσειακών Σιδηροδρόμων Αττικής or Greek: ΕΜΣΑ), a preservation society in the form of a non-for-profit company, maintains two small sections each 3 kilometres (1.9 mi) long, one near Kalyvia and one near Keratea.

== Visible Remains of the Line ==
In Agioi Anargyroi (Anakasa area), the old railway alignment corresponds to Georgiou Papandreou Street. Crossing the Kifisos river, in Nea Filadelfia, some railway tracks are still present. Lavriou Street takes its name from the railway line that once served the Lavrio area.

In Neo Irakleio, the railway route follows what are today Ifigeneias and Marinou Antypa streets. On Lavriou Street (bordering Agia Filothei and Alsoupoli), some tracks and a small intact railway bridge remain on the central reservation.

On Kapodistriou Street (Filothei) and at the intersection of Palaiologou / Papanikoli streets (Chalandri), rails are still buried beneath the ground but can be seen where erosion has exposed them.

The Chalandri station building survives in very good condition, located near a sports field close to the church of Agia Anna.

Today, Athens Metro Line 3 uses part of the old Lavreotiki railway corridor, specifically along Doukissis Plakentias Avenue and Attiki Odos motorway, from Chalandri metro station to Kleisthenous street, where a new metro/suburban railway station in Gerakas is planned (between Doukissis Plakentias and Gerakas stations).

In Gerakas, the old railway alignment corresponds to Thessalonikis Street. The station building is now the municipal changing rooms in the central square sports area. Rails are visible opposite the police station.

In Paiania, tracks remain in the Agia Marina area. The old station building functions as a nursery school. Rails inside the station were visible until the early 1990s, when they were covered to build a playground, but some tracks remain visible on the median strip of Attiki Odos.

The Koropi station building is preserved; until mid-2019 it was in poor condition until a local visual artist, in collaboration with the municipality, painted a period mural themed around the railway.

In Markopoulo, the station building was occasionally used as a café-restaurant until the mid-2000s and is now in poor condition. In front of it, in the station area, there are tracks and a train led by a Breda steam locomotive, also in poor condition.

The section from Kalyvia to Peta Kouvara occasionally operates as a museum railway by EMSA (Attica Museum Railway Society), using draisines D44 and D7, originally from the Thessaly Railways .

In Keratea, the station building is preserved, and in front of it remain two freight wagons that have been left there. The alignment south of Paiania is essentially intact, although many rails have been stolen by thieves. Several bridges, embankments, and other infrastructure remain, some in very good (possibly operational) condition, others in worse state.

At Daskaleio, the small station building exists and has been restored.

At Thoriko, rails and a railway bridge remain at the entrance to the fishing harbor. The station building is in dangerously poor condition.

Within Lavrio, the railway alignment remains intact. Tracks exist up to near the national stadium. All station buildings are in good condition. The main building houses the Cretan Cultural Association, and the restaurant building now operates as a fast-food outlet. The stationmaster’s residence remains locked but well preserved.

In the area where the tracks once lay, there is a decommissioned railcar, one of those used during the last years of the line’s operation, serving as a reminder of the railway’s past

== Technical Characteristics of the Line ==
- Gauge: 1,000 mm (metre gauge)
- Length: 62.548 km
- Maximum gradient: 2.5%
- Minimum curve radius: 180 m
- Rails: 20 kg/m

Connections:

- In Lavrio and Daskaleio with the metre-gauge industrial networks of E.E.M.L. and CFML
- In Irakleio with the Kifisia line
- In Agioi Anargyroi with the Piraeus–Patras line
- With private industrial sidings serving the lignite mines of Kalogreza and the Kampa distillery in Leontario

Infrastructure:

- Locomotive depot and turntable in Lavrio
- Turning triangles in Lavrio and Agioi Anargyroi

== Reopening ==
In 2016 a nine-station, 32-kilometre (20 mi) extension of the Athens Suburban Railway beyond Koropi station was announced. The extension to Lavrio will connect 300,000 more people to the rail network at a cost of €350 million. Although there had been little to no progress for many years, in 2024 it was officially announced that a tender process would begin for the construction of a railway line connecting Lavrio to Athens and International Airport "Eleftherios Venizelos". Three consortia are participating in the competition: GEK TERNA–Intrakat, AVAX–Alstom, and AKTOR–Metka. The new line is expected to reduce travel time between Lavrio and the airport to approximately 20 minutes, while for the centre of athens 50, significantly enhancing regional connectivity and economic development

== See also ==
- Lavrion Square–Strofyli railway
- Attica Railways
- Piraeus, Athens and Peloponnese Railways
