= KAT metro station =

Athens Metro station

ΚΑΤ
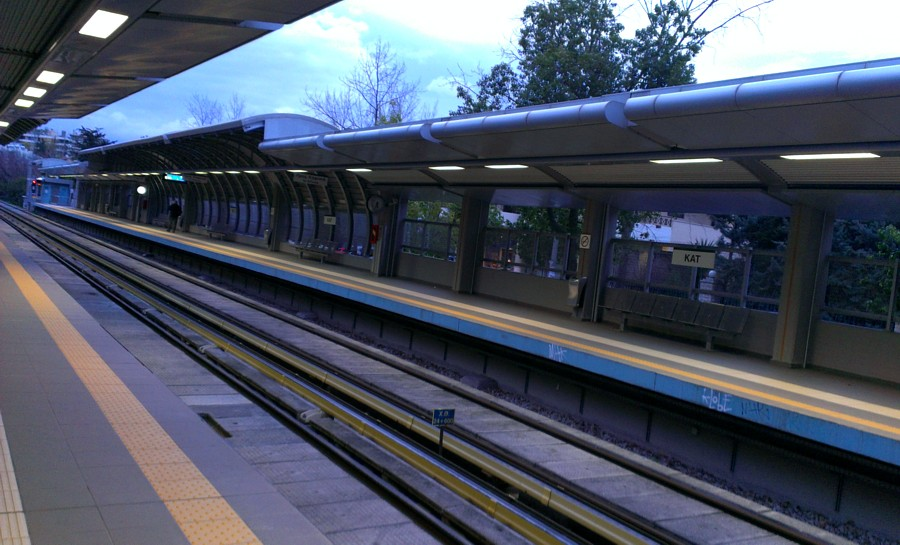
- KAT metro station

General information
- Location: 145 61 Kifissia; Greece
- Coordinates: 38.065955°N 23.804020°E
- Manager: STASY
- Line: Athens Metro Line 1
- Platforms: 2
- Tracks: 2

Construction
- Structure type: At-grade
- Accessible: Yes

Key dates
- 10 August 1957: Line opened
- 27 March 1989: Station opened
- 11 February 2004: Station rebuilt

Services
| Preceding station | Athens Metro | Following station |
|---|---|---|
| Marousi towards Piraeus | Line 1 | Kifissia Terminus |
Location

KAT (Greek: ΚΑΤ) is an Athens Metro station in Kifissia, a suburb in northern Athens, Greece. The station is a short distance west of the Traumatic Recovery Center (KAT), from which it derives its name. The station is situated 24.631 km from the starting point in Piraeus. The station was opened on 27 March 1989 and was renovated in 2004. It contains two platforms.

== Station Layout ==
L1
Footbridge
- Control post
G
Side platform
Southbound
← towards Piraeus (Marousi)
Northbound
towards Kifissia (terminus) →
Side platform
- Customer service
- Tickets
- Entry/Exit
