= Sepolia metro station =

Athens Metro station

Σεπόλια Sepolia
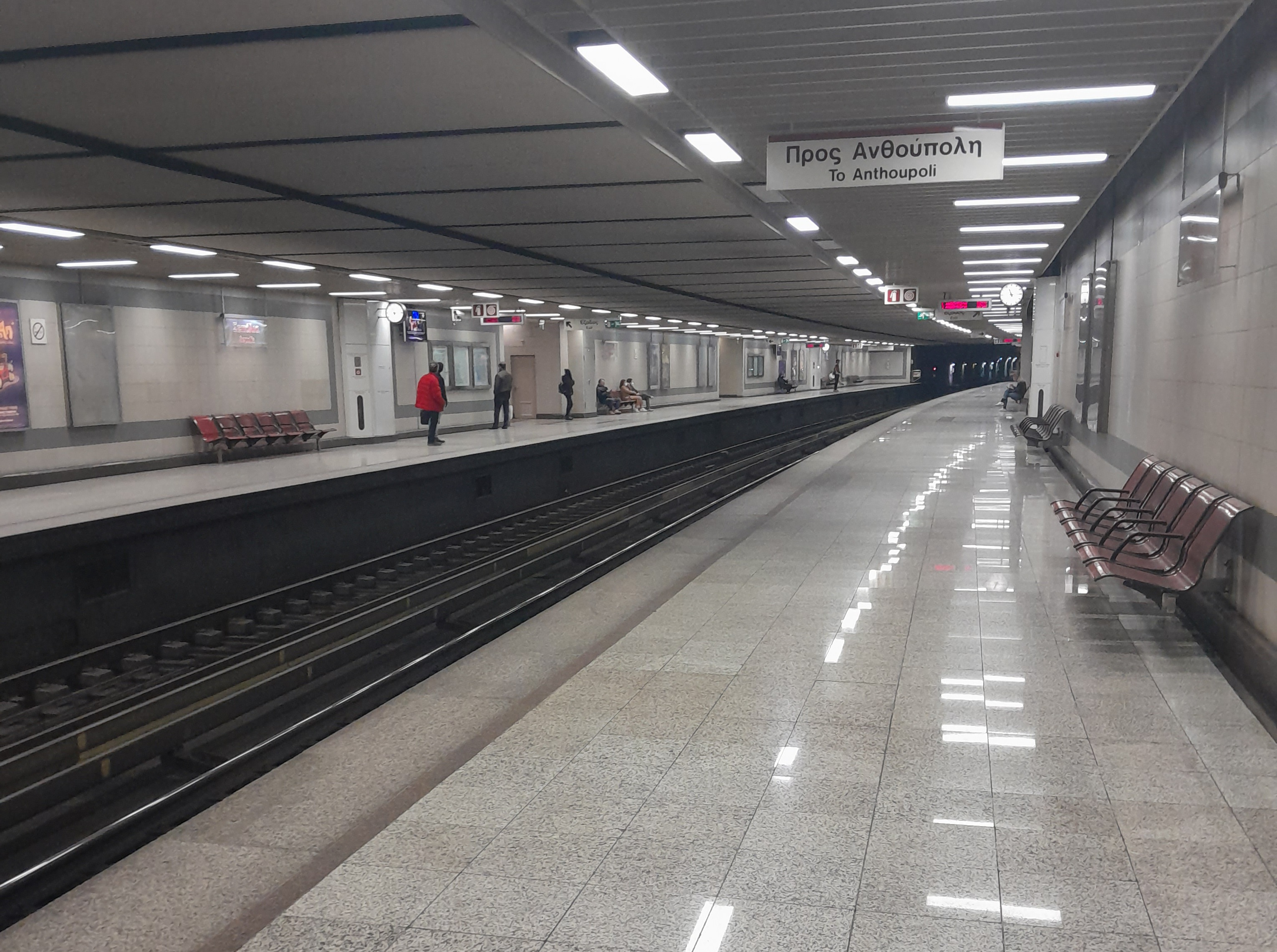

General information
- Location: Antigonis; 104 43 Athens; Greece
- Coordinates: 38.002675°N 23.713540°E
- Manager: STASY
- Line: Athens Metro Line 2
- Platforms: 2
- Tracks: 2

Construction
- Structure type: Underground
- Accessible: Yes

Key dates
- 28 January 2000: Opened

Services
Preceding station	Athens Metro	Following station
Agios Antonios towards Anthoupoli	Line 2	Attiki towards Elliniko
Location

Sepolia (Greek: Σεπόλια) is a station on Athens Metro Line 2. It was named after the neighbourhood Sepolia, where it is located. It opened on 28 January 2000 and served as the original northern terminus of Line 2 until Agios Antonios opened in August 2004.

== Station layout ==
G
Street level
Exits
B1
Concourse
- Customer Service
- Tickets
B2
Side platform, doors will open on the right
Platform 1
← to Anthoupoli (Agios Antonios)
Platform 2
to Elliniko (Attiki) →
Side platform, doors will open on the right
