= European Commission Investment Plan for Europe =

The European Commission’s Investment Plan for Europe (EC IPE) known as the “Juncker Plan” or the “EU Infrastructure Investment Plan” is an ambitious infrastructure investment programme first announced by European Commission President Jean-Claude Juncker in November 2014: it aims at unlocking public and private investments in the “real economy” of at least € 315 billion over a three years fiscal period (Jan. 2015 – Dec. 2017).

== A priority for EU policy makers ==
=== Top item in EU Commission 2015 work programme ===
At a December 16, 2014 meeting held in Strasbourg, EU Commission policy makers termed it the number one initiative in their new “roadmap for getting Europe back to work, based on clear priorities […] to boost our economy”.

=== 'Focal point' of Latvian EU council presidency ===
In a January 9, 2015 meeting held in Riga to kick off Latvia's EU Council presidency, Latvian Prime Minister Laimdota Straujuma insisted that, during its mandate, Latvia would focus on introducing the commission's €315bn investment plan "which testifies that we are committed to supporting our businesses".

== Mediocre physical infrastructure in many EU countries, including Germany ==
Even rich EU countries such as Germany and Luxembourg had for many years deliberately delayed or reduced infrastructure investments in order to limit public spending. There is thus an EU-wide need for better transport links, power grid connections, super-fast broadband networks, as well as school and hospital improvements.

== Fostering growth through co-investment with inst. investors ==
The adoption of the European Commission’s Investment Plan coincides with the emergence of a new, more progressive policy consensus propitious to long-term investments in modern transportation, energy and other socially-beneficial assets after seven consecutive years of low to mediocre growth that followed the start of the Great Recession.

It also coincides with a renewed interest for infrastructure assets from the part of pension funds, sovereign wealth funds and insurers, at a time when returns from some of their traditional core investment vehicles - notably government bonds and listed equity - proved to be lower than they normally had been in years past (“quest for yields” in a context of monetary complacency).

== Avoiding ‘highways to nowhere’ and ‘white elephant’ projects ==
Some experts have called for a cost-conscious approach to alleviate concerns by European taxpayers that it could turn out to be another expensive EU scheme characterized by administrative inefficiencies and political preferentialism for local or national ‘pet projects,’ potentially causing an oversupply of certain types of infrastructure projects in countries or regions that don’t really need them: “EU policy makers, public lenders and development banks will need to assess thoroughly the tangible interest of future infrastructure investments one project at a time, an effort for which prospective pension and insurance co-investors from sophisticated jurisdictions such as Alberta, California, Ontario, Switzerland and the UK can play a decisive part.”

== Results ==
In August 2018, the investments triggered by the 'Juncker plan' are said to amount to €335bn, exceeding the objective by $20bn. The European Investment Bank financing is said to exceed $65bn, making the leverage ratio at about 5, while the initial (criticized) estimation was 15 The European Investment Bank provides a list of EFSI projects but it's very limited and can't account for the given results; some data on private financing is also hidden due to business confidentiality.

A study by Ernst and Young contracted by the European Commission at the end of 2016 seems to be the most recent evaluation of the project; while EY is a well-known audit company the report takes pains to point that it is an 'ad hoc audit' that has to be done in a 'short time frame': one month for data collection based on interviews with project stakeholders and an online survey of 136 participants with 65 full responses (page 12) and as such has 'limitations to the level of depth' (page 2)
