= Attica Railways =

- Attica Railways Locomotive Γ10

Overview
- Native name: Σιδηρόδρομοι Αττικής
- Locale: Attica, Greece
- Termini: Athens; Lavrion, Dionyssos
- Stations: 23

Service
- Type: Private company

History
- Commenced: 1882
- Opened: 20 June 1885
- Purchased: 1910

Technical
- Line length: 76 km (47 mi)
- Track gauge: 1,000 mm (3 ft 3 3/8 in)

Attica Railways (Greek: Σιδηρόδρομοι Αττικής) was a private railway company which operated a metre gauge railway system in Attica, Greece.

The contract between the Greek government and the Hellenic Company of Lavrion Metallurgies was signed in 1882. The line would connect downtown Athens to Eastern Attica terminating at the mining town of Lavrion, with a branch line from Heraklion to Kifissia.

The line from Attiki station to Kifissia (a northern suburb) was opened on February 2, 1885, and was later extended further north to Stofyli. The main line to Lavrion was opened on June 20, 1885. In 1889 the line was extended by 2 kilometres (1.2 mi) towards the center of Athens, the new terminal station located at Lavrion Square, near Omonoia Square.

The total length of the lines operated by Attica Railways was 76 kilometres (47 mi). The main rolling stock depot and repair workshop were located at Attiki station, with additional facilities at Lavrion.

In 1910 Attica Railways were taken over by the Hellenic Electric Company private company.

== See also ==
- Lavrion Square-Strofyli railway
- Athens-Lavrion Railway
