= Kalogreza railway station =

Railway station in Athens, Greece

Kalogreza station (Greek: Σταθμός Καλογρέζας) was a station of the Piraeus, Athens and Peloponnese Railways (SPAP) in Kalogreza in Nea Ionia, Athens, Greece next to the boundary with Maroussi, and was also the northernmost station. The station was constructed for the use of lignite production and its trucks from Kalogreza. The station opened after 1944 and closed in 1957. The line connected with the Athens–Lavrion Railway with transportation between Heraklio and Chalakdri with several curves heading to Heraklio.

Preceding station	Former railways	Following station
Irakleio towards Lavrion Square	Athens–Lavrion Railway Kalogreza branch	Terminus
