= Hellenic Electric Railways =

Greek railway infrastructure company

- Native name: Ελληνικοί Ηλεκτρικοί Σιδηρόδρομοι
- Romanized name: Ellinikoi Ilektrikoi Sidirodromoi
- Company type: Privately owned company
- Industry: Rail transport
- Predecessor: SAP
- Founded: 14 April 1926; 100 years ago
- Successor: Athens–Piraeus Electric Railways (ISAP)
- Headquarters: Athens, Greece
- Area served: Greater Athens
- Products: Rail transport
- Owner: Power and Traction Financial Ltd

The Hellenic Electric Railways (Greek: Ελληνικοί Ηλεκτρικοί Σιδηρόδρομοι, romanized: Ellinikoi Ilektrikoi Sidirodromoi, ΕΗΣ) was a private owned company member of British company "Power and Traction Company Ltd" which operated and extended the present Line 1 of the Athens Metro, from 14 April 1926 to 31 December 1975.

The company was nationalised and replaced by the Athens–Piraeus Electric Railways, on 1 January 1976: that company was later absorbed by STASY on 17 June 2011.

== History ==
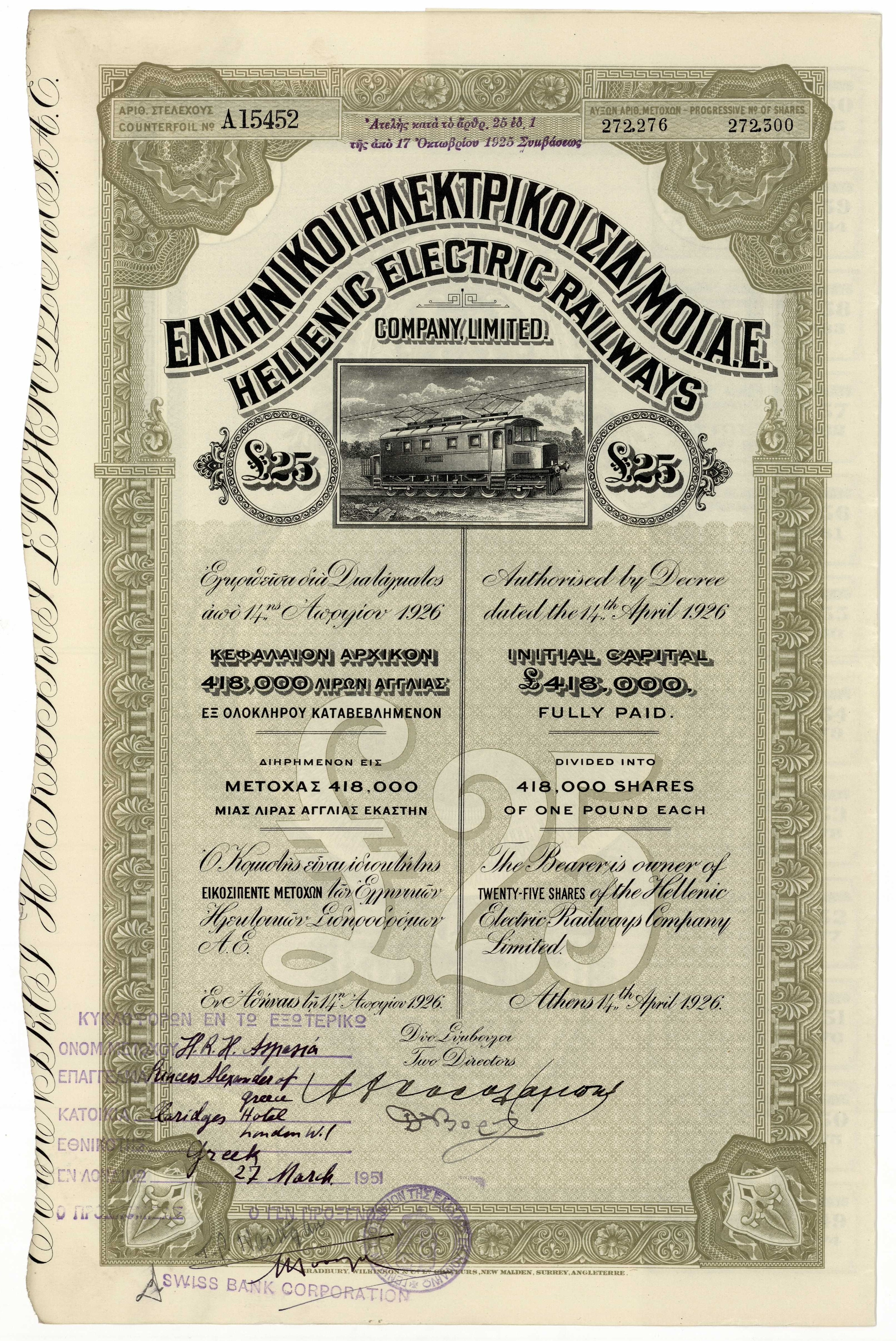
Share of the Hellenic Electric Railways Company Ltd., issued 14. April 1926

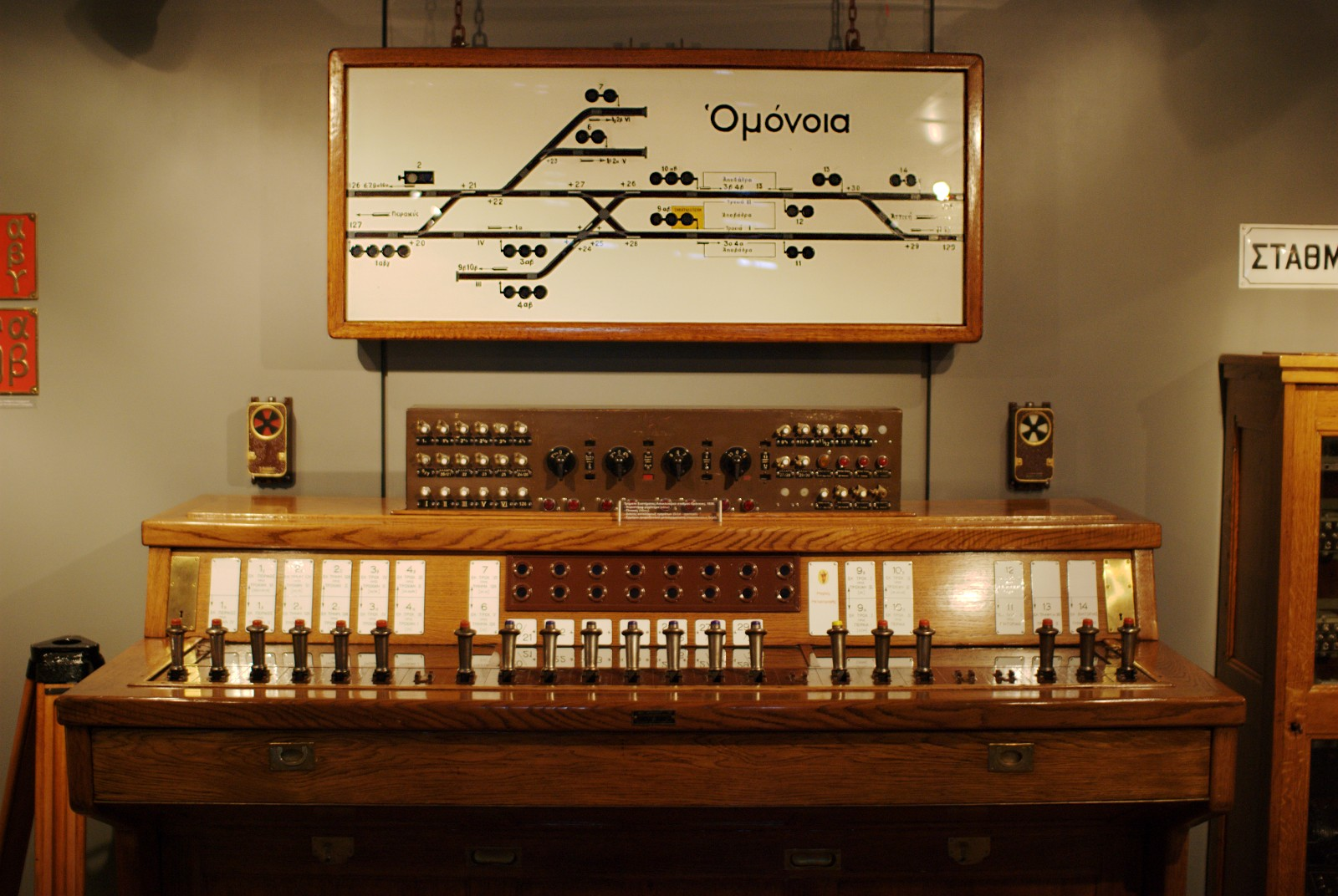
Hellenic Electric Railways Company Omonoia station signal box

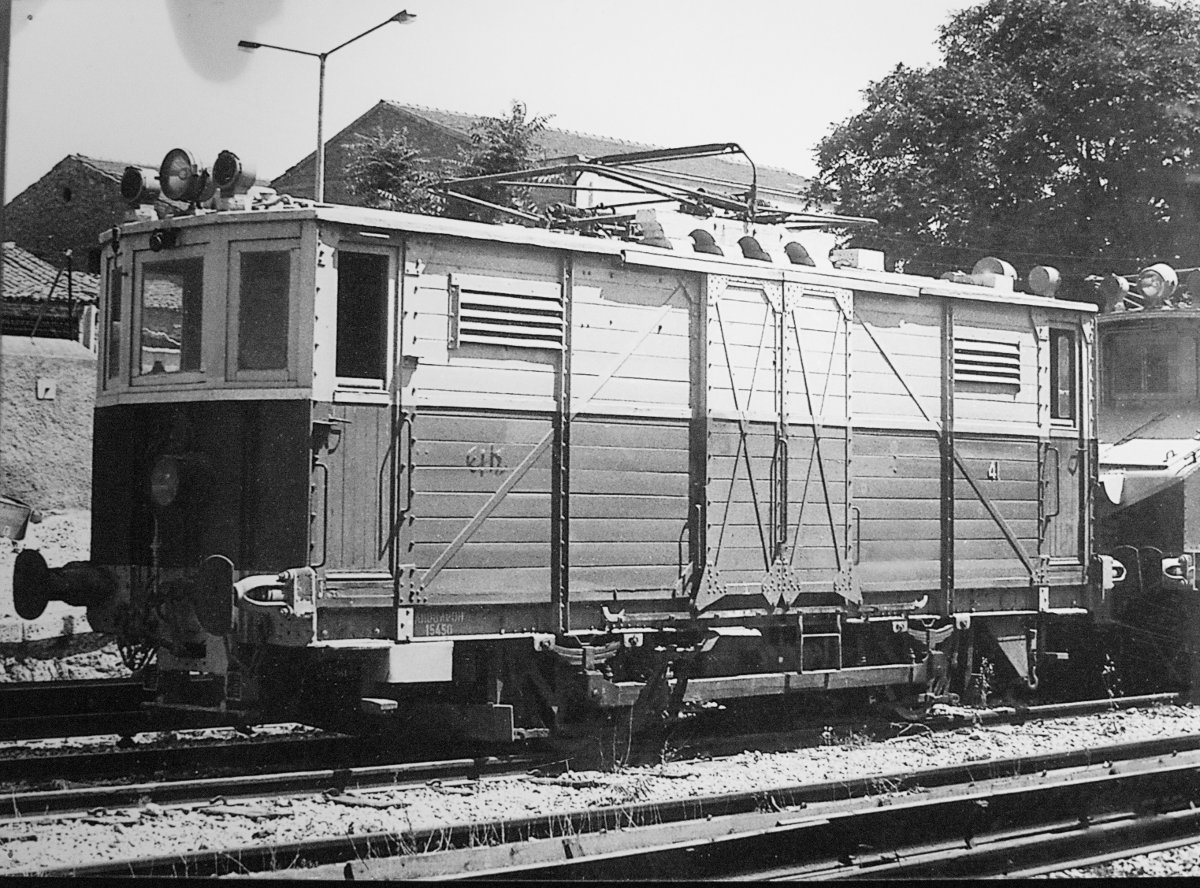
Electric freight railcar No 41 of the Hellenic Electric Railways.

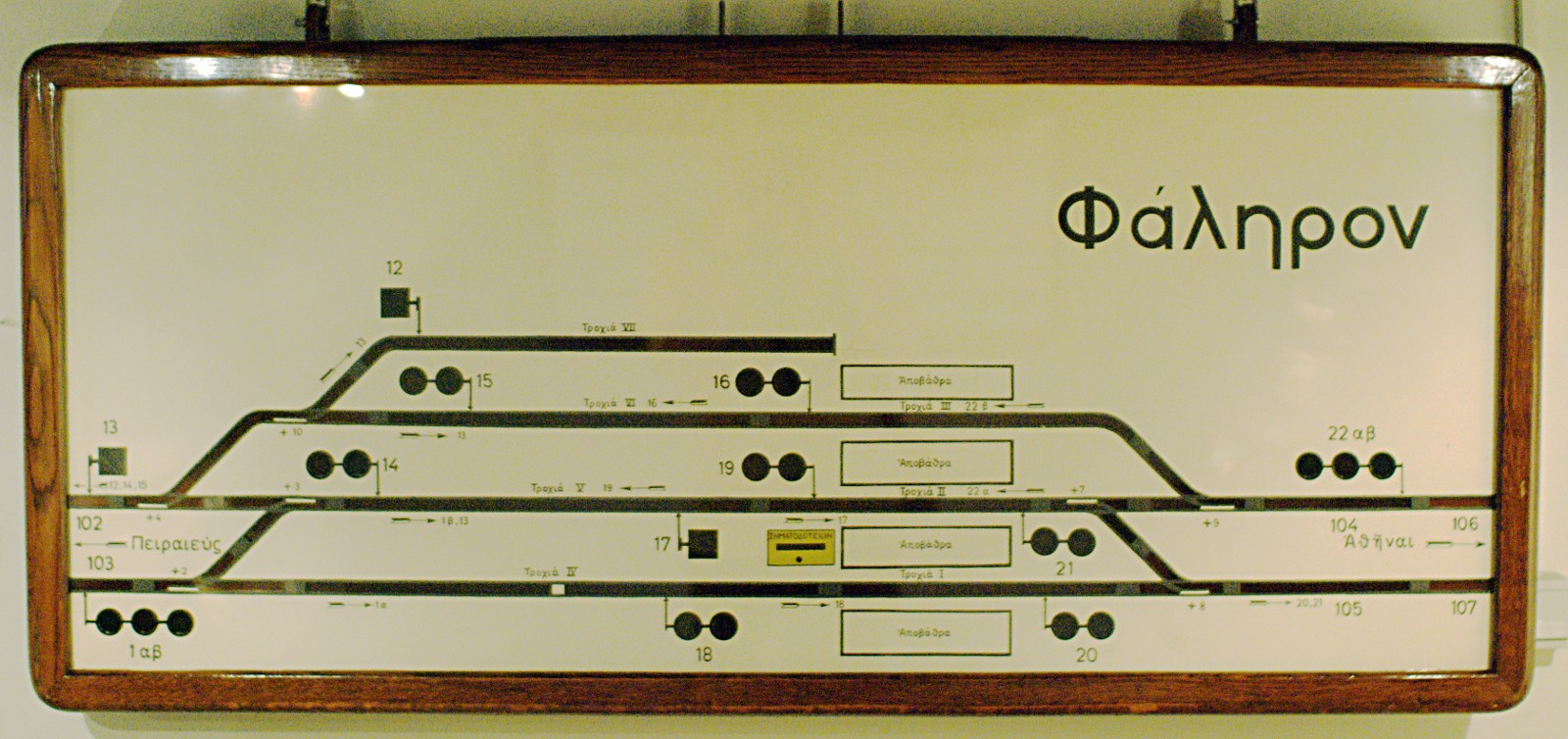
Electrical track diagram from the signal box of Faleron station of Hellenic Electric Railways

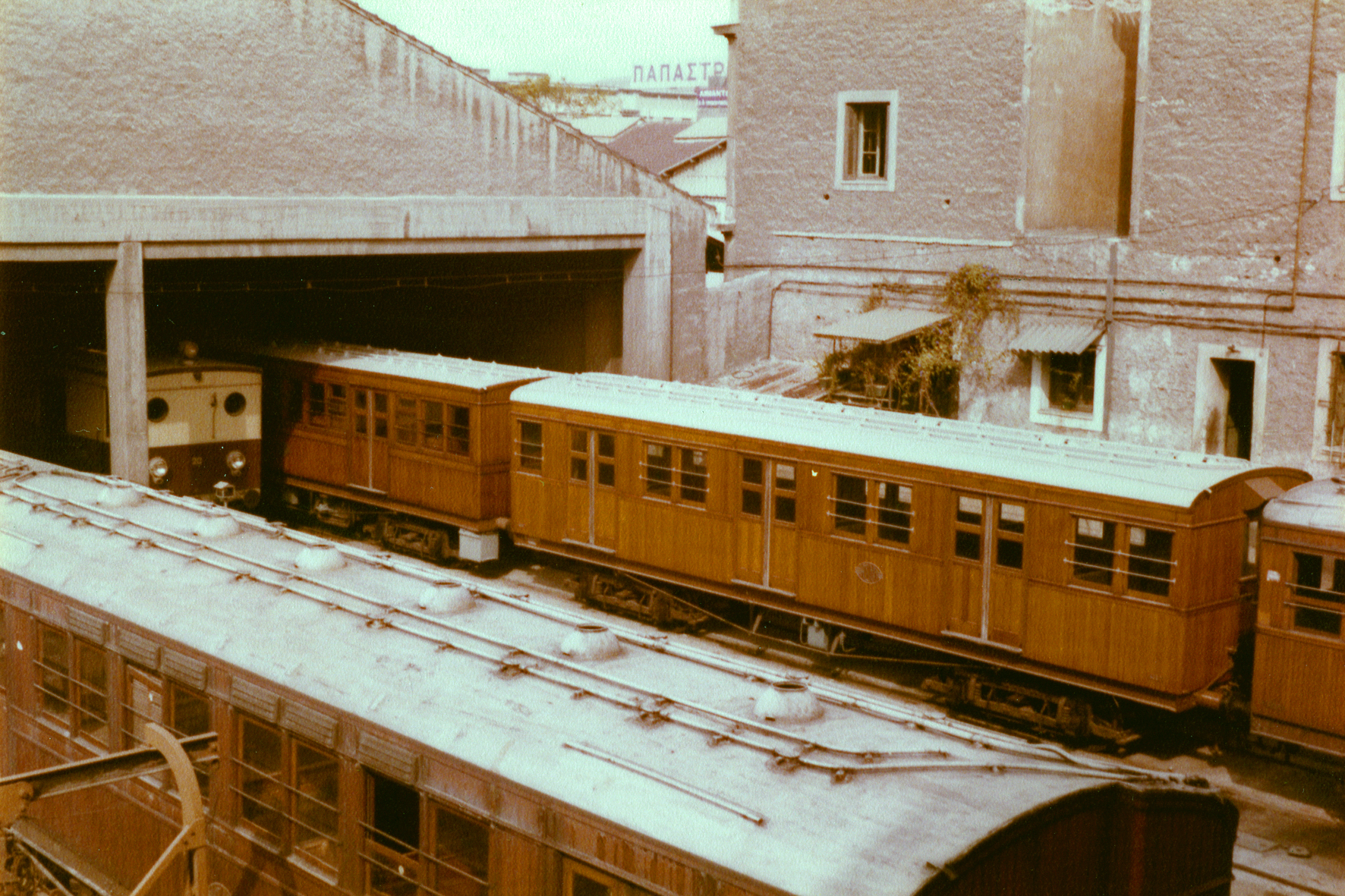
Hellenic Electric Railways wooden train

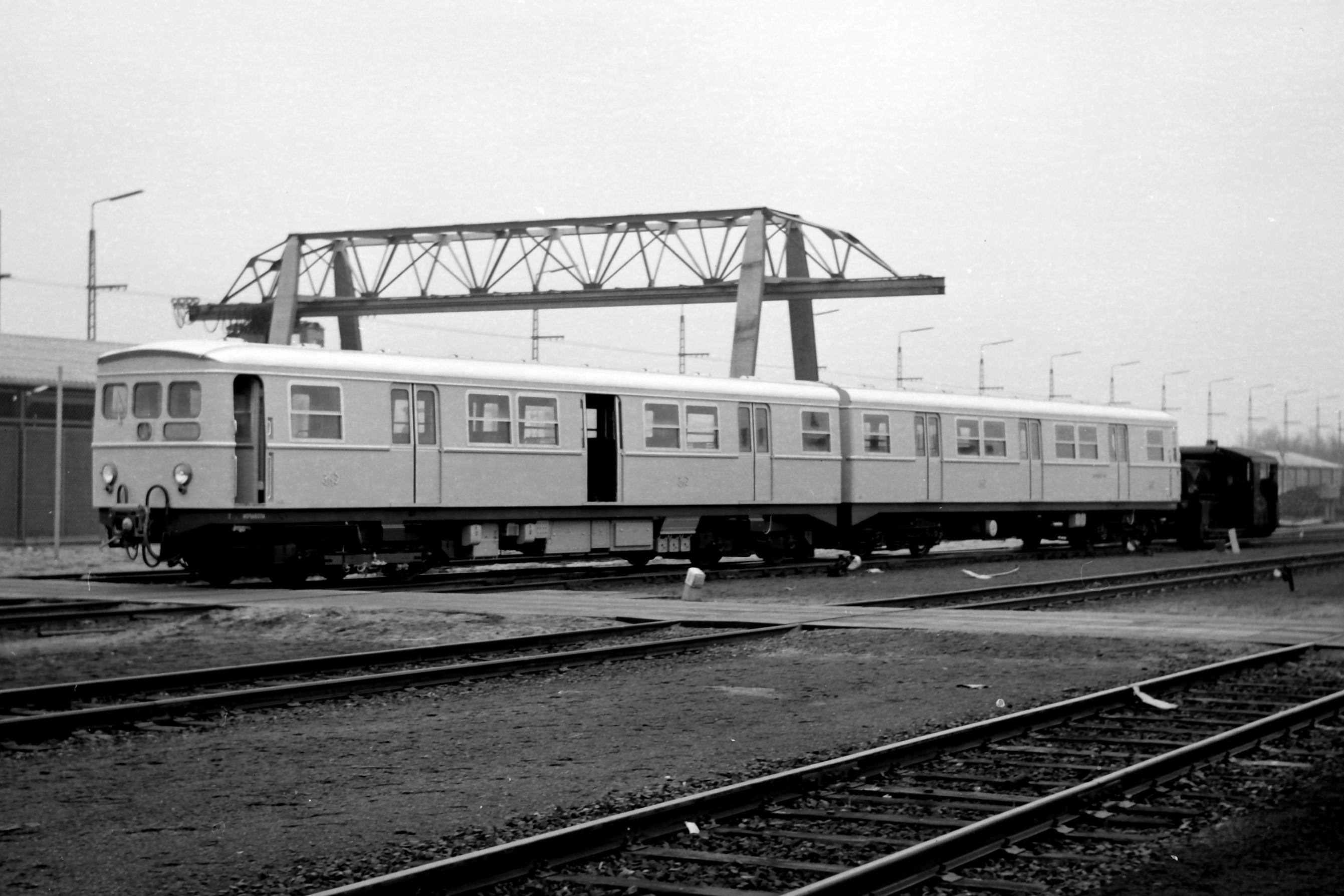
U-Bahn Athen Siemens-MAN EIS

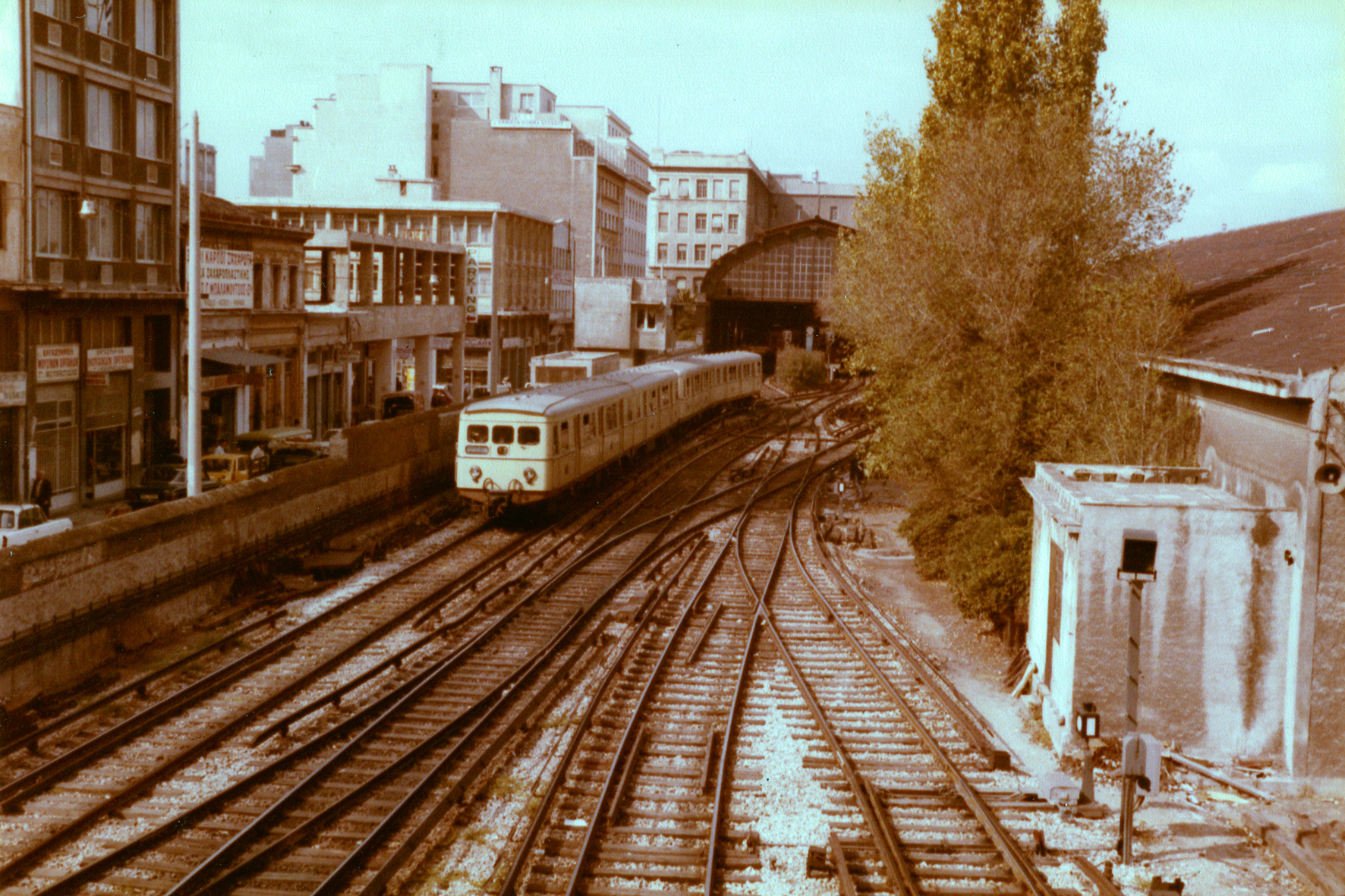
Athens metro line 1 old system EIS 2

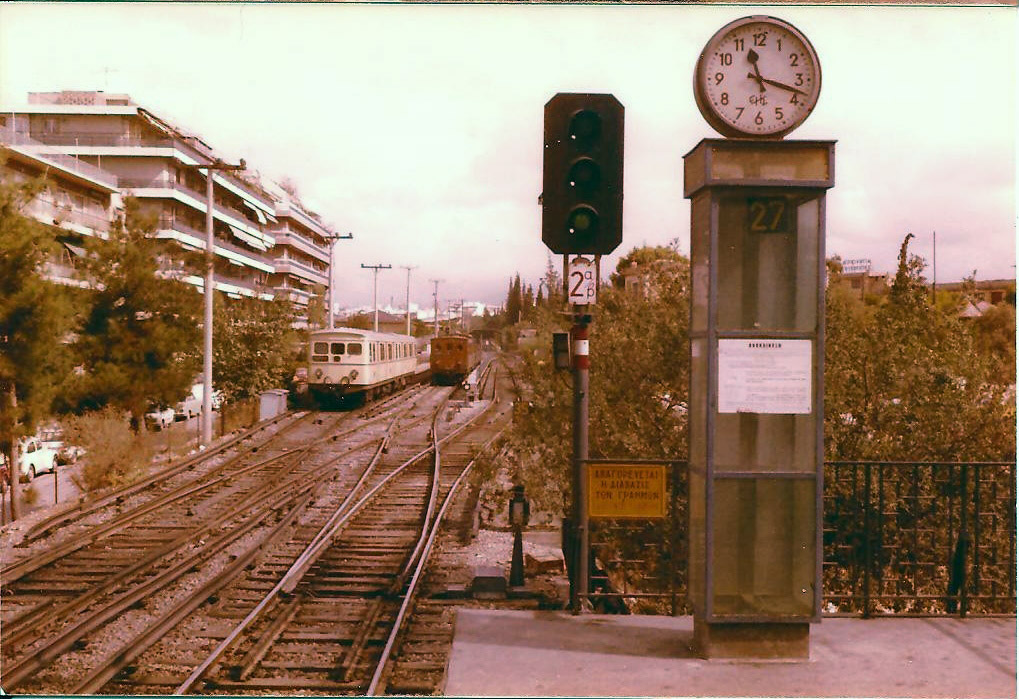
Athens metro line 1 old system EIS

In 1926 the SAP S.A. was bought by the Power and Traction Finance Ltd and renamed as the Hellenic Electric Railways. In 1926 the sister company Ilektriki Etaireia Metaforon or H.E.M., also part of Power Group, took over the 1,000 mm (3 ft 3+3/8 in) metre gauge Lavrion Square-Strofyli railway. This line was eventually converted to standard gauge, double track and became an extension of the existing line, reaching Attiki in 1948 and Kifissia in 1958.
