= Kifissia metro station =

Athens Metro station

Κηφισιά Kifissia
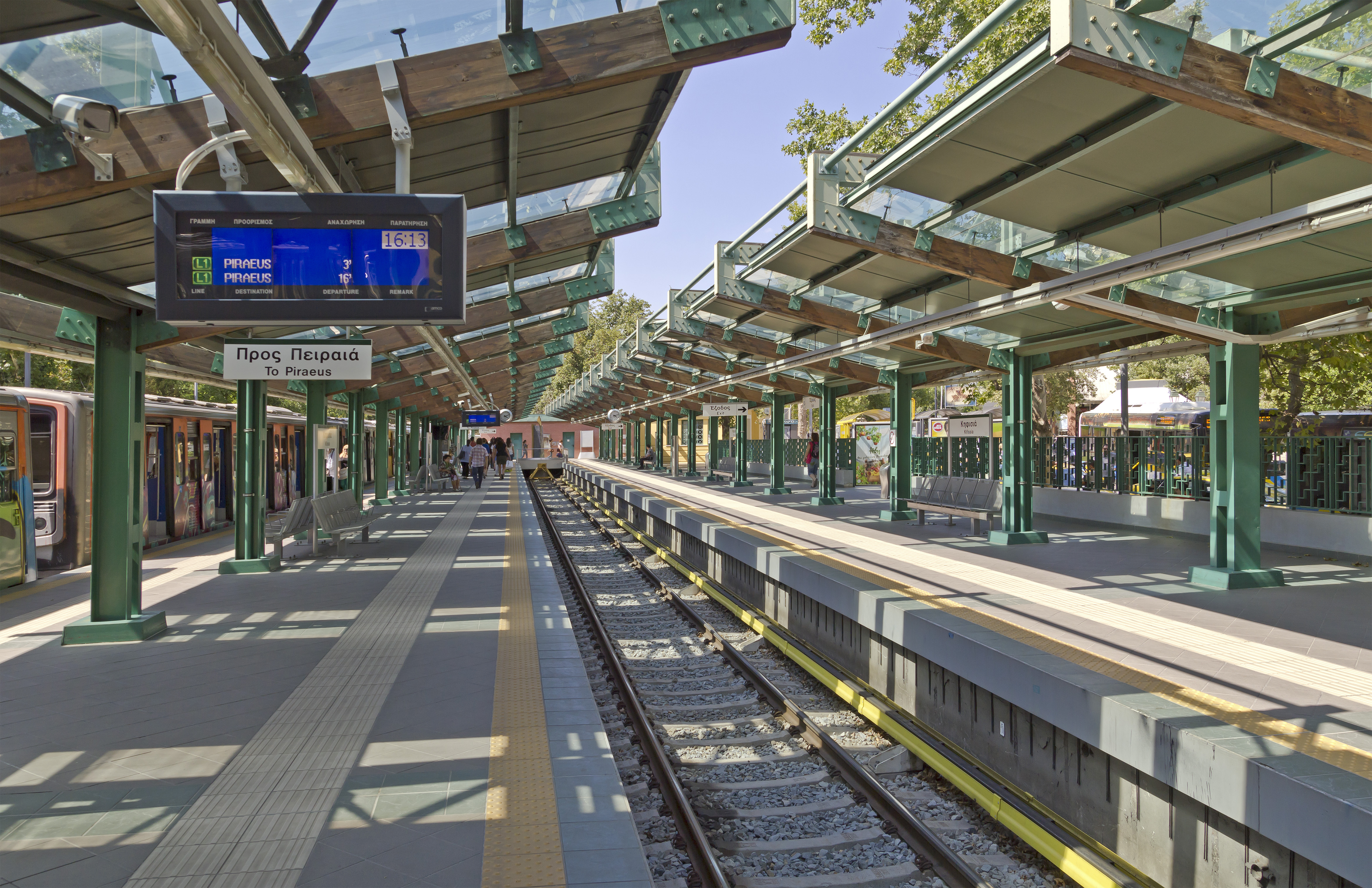
- Kifissia metro station

General information
- Location: 145 61 Kifissia; Greece
- Coordinates: 38.073225°N 23.808160°E
- Manager: STASY
- Line: Athens Metro Line 1
- Platforms: 2
- Tracks: 2

Construction
- Structure type: At-grade
- Accessible: Yes

Key dates
- 10 August 1957: Opened
- 14 July 2004: Rebuilt

Services
Preceding station	Athens Metro	Following station
KAT towards Piraeus	Line 1	Terminus
Former services
Preceding station	Former railways	Following station
Marousi towards Lavrion Square	Lavrion Square–Strofyli Railway	Strofyli Terminus
Location

Kifissia (Greek: Κηφισιά, Kifisia) is a metro station in Kifissia, a suburb in northern Athens, Greece. It is the northern terminus of Athens Metro Line 1, located 25.655 km from the starting point in Piraeus. The station was opened on 10 August 1957, and was renovated for the 2004 Summer Olympics.

== History ==
Kifissia metro station was opened by the Hellenic Electric Railways on 10 August 1957, as part of the most recent extension of the line from Irakleio: the station was then renovated for the 2004 Summer Olympics, with the renovation works being completed on 14 July 2004.

The metro station was built on the same location as the former Lavrion Square–Strofyli railway station, which was 15.5 kilometres along the former railway from Lavrion Square: that station was open from 4 February 1885 to 8 August 1938.

== Accidents and incidents ==
=== 2009 Incident ===
On 3 March 2009, masked vandals destroyed a train waiting on one of station's platforms with Molotov cocktails, causing the service to be cut back to Eirini.

=== 2020 accident ===
On 7 July 2020, an Kifisias-bound terminating train hit the buffers as it failed to slow while entering the station, with reports of no deaths and a total of 8 and 10 lightly injured in the incident.

== Station layout ==
G
Through line
to sidings
West track
← towards Piraeus (KAT)
Island platform
East track
← towards Piraeus (KAT)
Side platform
Concourse
- Customer service
- Tickets
- Entry/Exit
