= Lavrion Square–Strofyli railway =

Railway line in Greece

- Attica Railways Locomotive Γ10

Overview
- Native name: Σιδηροδρομική Γραμμή Πλατείας Λαυρίου - Στροφυλίου
- Status: closed (rebuilt as a rapid transit line)
- Locale: Attica, Greece
- Termini: Lavrion Square, Athens; Strofyli, Kifissia
- Stations: 23

History
- Opened: 4 February 1885
- Closed: 8 August 1938

Technical
- Line length: 76 km (47 mi)
- Track gauge: 1,000 mm (3 ft 3 3/8 in)

The Lavrion Square–Strofyli railway (Greek: Σιδηροδρομική Γραμμή Πλατείας Λαυρίου - Στροφυλίου) was a 1,000 mm (3 ft 3 3/8 in) metre-gauge railway line that ran from Lavrion Square (near Omonoia Square) in downtown Athens to the northern suburb of Kifissia and its local neighbourhood of Strofyli.

== History of the line ==
=== Attica Railways (1885–1926) ===
The line opened on 4 February 1885 as a single-track, metre-gauge railway from Attiki Square in downtown Athens to Kifissia. Until 1926, the line was operated by Attica Railways, which also operated the branch from Heraklion to Lavrion. The headquarters of Attica Railways, along with a rolling stock depot, repair workshops and goods sidings were located at Attiki Square, next to Liossion street.

From downtown Athens to Kifissia, the line followed the alignment now used by Line 1 of the Athens Metro. The line was extended south to Lavrion Square in 1889, a short distance from Omonoia Square. The section from Lavrion Square to Attiki Square currently runs underground in a shallow cut-and-cover tunnel, but in the days of Attica Railways it ran at street level as a tramway.

From Kifissia, the line was extended north to Strofyli. The section from Athens (Lavrion Square) to Heraklion was 9.2 kilometres (5.7 mi) long and from Heraklion to Strofyli 7.4 kilometres (4.6 mi).

The line was further extended as an industrial railway from Strofyli to the English Marble Company quarries at Dionysos after 1900.

The line carried both passenger and freight traffic between Athens and Kifissia. The extension to Strofyli was used mainly by freight trains transporting blocks of marble.

=== Electric Transport Co. (1926–1938) ===
In 1926, the line was transferred to the Electric Transport Company (Greek: Ηλεκτρική Εταιρεία Μεταφορών, or ΗΕΜ), a member of the Power and Traction Finance Co. group. In 1929, the branch from Heraklion to Lavrion was taken over by the Piraeus, Athens and Peloponnese Railways (ΣΠΑΠ). After 1926, trains to Kifissia again departed from Attiki station, and the section between Lavrion Square and Attiki Square was served by tram route K.

The Electric Transport Company operated the line until 8 August 1938, when it was closed pending electrification works, which were interrupted by World War II.

=== Aftermath ===
From 1928 to 1930, the Greek Electric Railways (Greek: Ελληνικοί Ηλεκτρικοί Σιδηρόδρομοι, or ΕΗΣ), a company owned by the Power group, built a cut-and cover tunnel between the previously unconnected Omonoia and Attiki stations. The rebuilt section was opened in 1949 as a standard-gauge extension of the Piraeus-Kifissia line.

In 1950, the line between Attiki and Strofyli stations was transferred within the Power group, from ΗΕΜ to ΕΗΣ. This was done to continue the planned renovation, gauge conversion and electrification works which had been interrupted by World War II. The line reopened in stages to Nea Ionia in 1956, then to Kifissia in 1957. The remaining section from Kifissia to Strofyli was abandoned.

== Rolling stock ==
Initially Attica Railways used nine Tubize 0-6-2T steam locomotives (1885). Later it acquired nine Krauss Z 2-6-0T, plus one of the same type constructed in Piraeus by Basileiades. After 1929 only the Tubize locomotives remained in use on the Kifissia line, as the Krauss locomotives were transferred to SPAP for the Lavrion branch.

== Strofyli station ==
The Strofyli station (Greek: Σταθμός Στροφυλίου) was a station of the Attica Railways in Kifissia, a northern suburb of Athens. It was the northern terminus of the Lavrion Square–Strofyli railway, located 16.5 km from the southern terminus at Lavrion Square in central Athens. The station was opened after 1900, and closed in 1938.

The station was also the starting point of a short metre-gauge freight railway to a marble quarry at Dionysos.

== See also ==
- Attica Railways
- Athens–Lavrion Railway
- Athens–Piraeus Electric Railways
