= Third Cemetery of Athens =

Cemetery in Greece

Third Cemetery of Athens Τρίτο Νεκροταφείο Αθηνών
- Interactive map of Third Cemetery of Athens; Τρίτο Νεκροταφείο Αθηνών

Details
- Location: Nikaia, Attica
- Country: Greece
- Coordinates: 37°58′48″N 23°40′1″E

The Third Cemetery of Athens (Greek: Τρίτο Νεκροταφείο Αθηνών, Tríto Nekrotafeío Athinón) is a cemetery located in the Aspra Chomata district of Nikaia. It is located at the junction of Thebes and Petros Ralli avenues and its central entrance is on Kavkasou street. The area of the cemetery is part of the Municipality of Nikaia-Agios Ioannis Renti and administratively falls under the Municipality of Athens.

It is the largest cemetery in the Balkans, with more than 27,000 burial monuments. It is also considered important because several famous Greeks are laid to rest there. In its northwestern part, at the height where the boundaries of the municipalities of Nikaia, Korydallos, Agia Varvara and Aigaleo, it also includes a Jewish cemetery, the second overall cemetery of the Jewish community in Athens. In the surrounding area within the cemetery, there are monuments to the victims of the Executions of Kokkinia and the Aigaleo massacre, respectively.

Near the cemetery are the Nikaia Municipal Gymnasium, the D.A.K. Nicaea "Plato" and the General Hospital of Nicaea Piraeus "Agios Panteleimon".
