= Polis Egaleo Rugby =

- Full name: Polis Egaleo Rugby
- Founded: 2010
- Location: Egaleo, Greece
- Coach(es): -
Team kit

Polis Egaleo Rugby (City Egaleo) is a Greek rugby club in Egaleo.
