= Agia Varvara metro station =

Athens Metro station

Αγία Bαρβάρα Agia Varvara
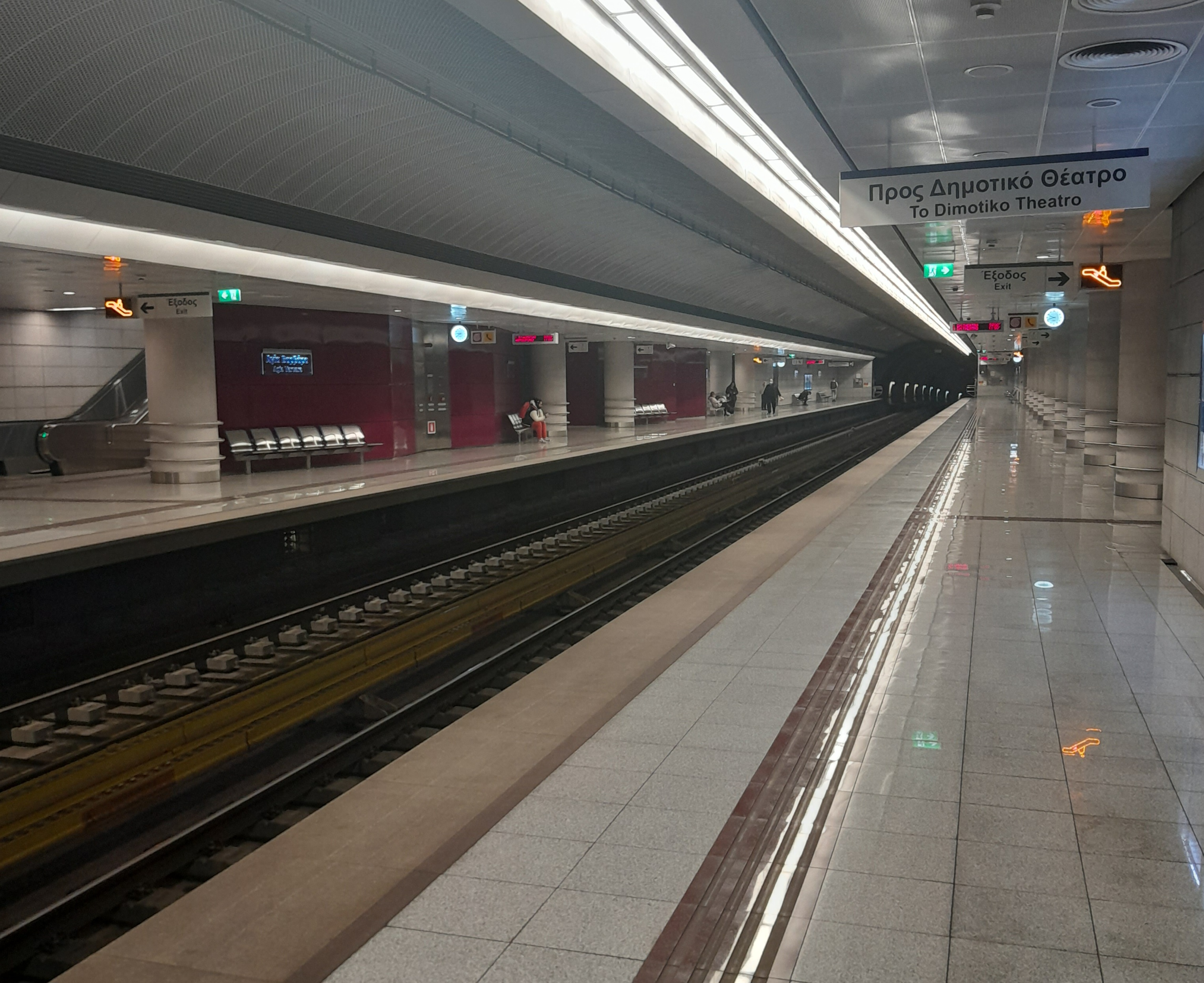
- Station platforms, February 2023

General information
- Location: 123 51 Agia Varvara; Greece
- Coordinates: 37°59′23″N 23°39′34″E
- Manager: STASY
- Line: Athens Metro Line 3
- Platforms: 2
- Tracks: 2

Construction
- Structure type: Underground
- Accessible: Yes

Key dates
- 7 July 2020: Opened

Services
Preceding station	Athens Metro	Following station
Korydallos towards Dimotiko Theatro	Line 3	Agia Marina towards Athens Airport
Location

Agia Varvara (Greek: Αγία Bαρβάρα) is a station on Athens Metro Line 3. A part of the Piraeus extension, construction on the station began in 2012 and it opened on July 7, 2020, along with the extension's phase I to Nikaia.

== Location ==
The station is located underneath Eleftheriou Venizelou street, near Agia Eleousa square in Agia Varvara.

== Station description ==
The station can be accessed by three ground-level entrances, all of which lead to the concourse level. The concourse level is rectangular, daylight-penetrated, with burgundy walls and white ceiling. The platforms are on a north-south axis and each platform's decoration is divided in three sections. The north and south sides' walls are covered with unpolished granite blocks. In the middle section the platforms are slightly wider, the ceiling is supported by cylindrical pillars and the walls are covered with slightly angled burgundy metal panels. The ceiling is white and the part above the tracks is covered with curved white metal panels.

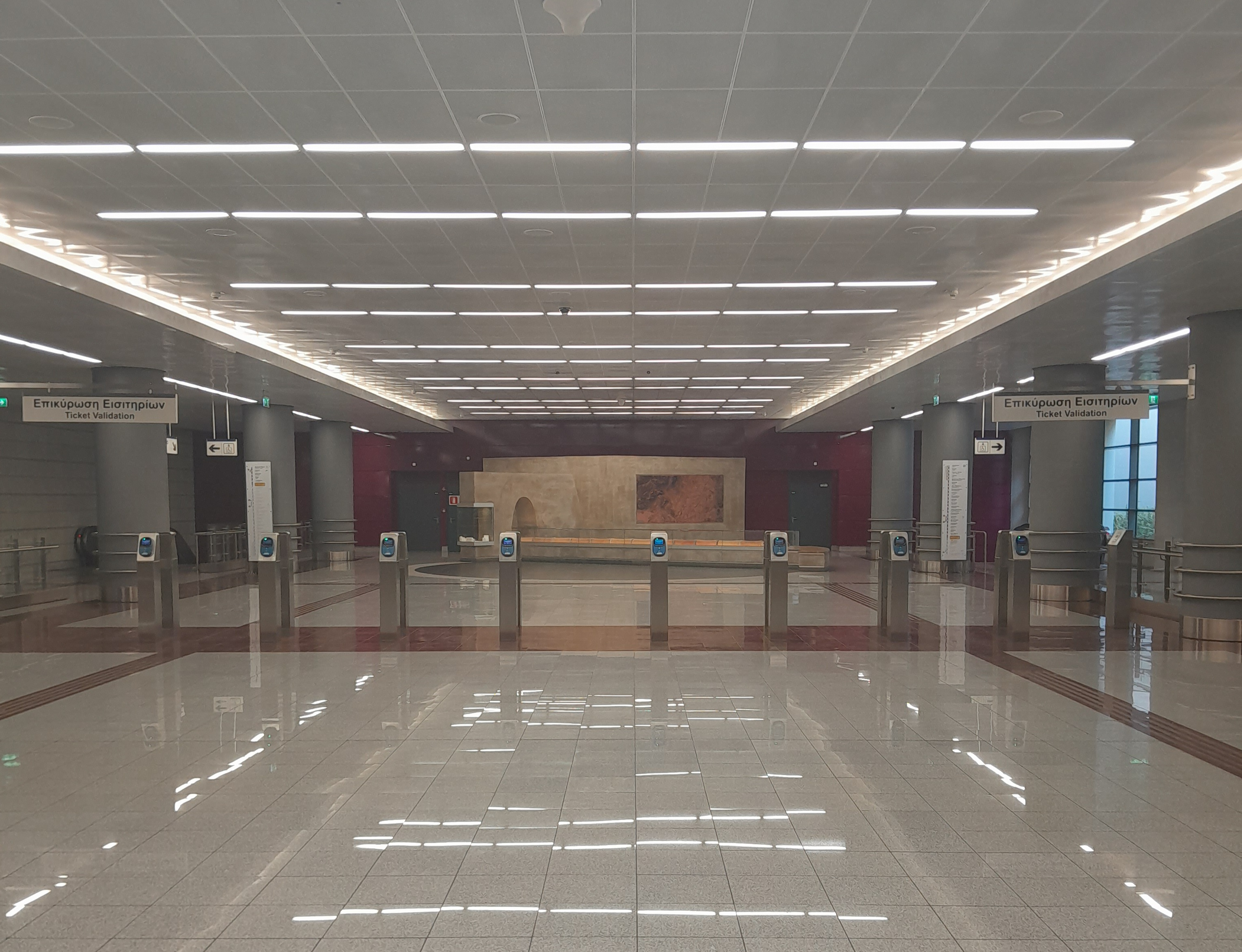
The station's concourse level

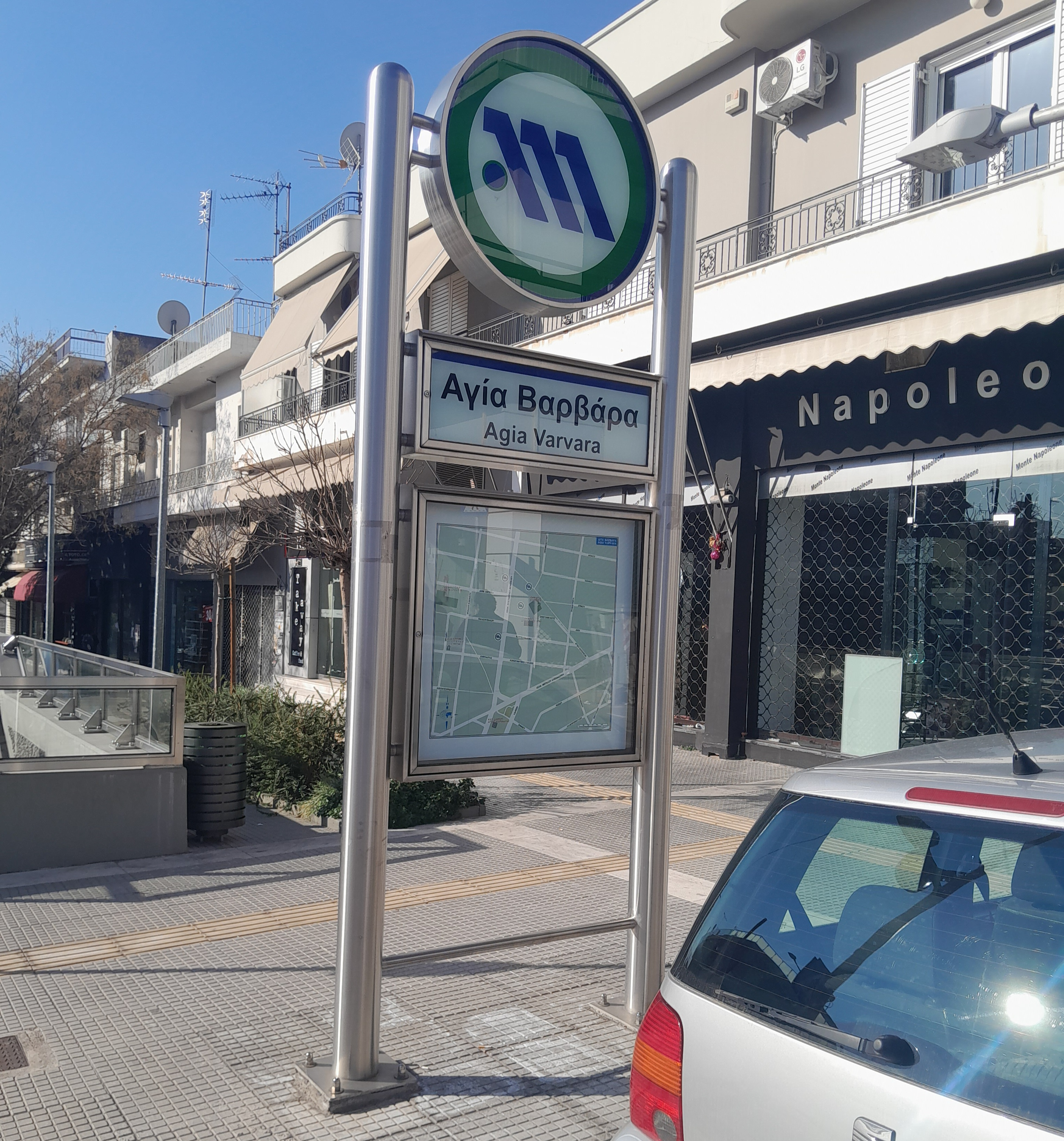
Entrance sign on El. Venizelou ave.

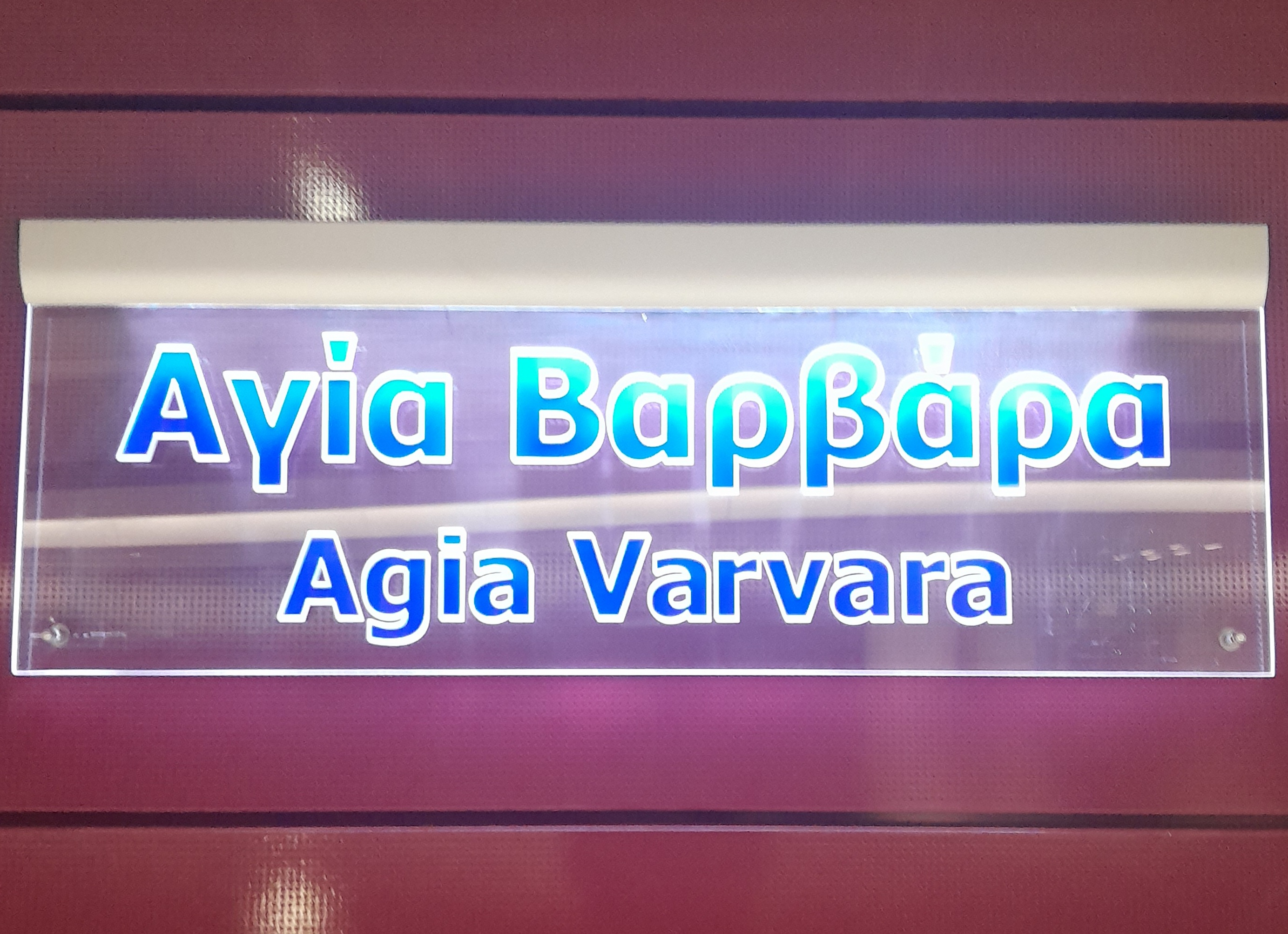
Sign on the station's platform

== Exits ==
Exit	Location	Image	Accessibility	Coordinates
	Ag. Eleousas Sq.			37°59′24″N 23°39′35″E
	El Venizelou Ave./Kritis Str.			37°59′25″N 23°39′33″E
	El. Venizelou Ave./Kalantzakou Str.			37°59′21″N 23°39′33″E

== Antiquities ==
Parts of an ancient pipeline were discovered during the station's construction. The reconstructed pipeline is exhibited on the concourse level.

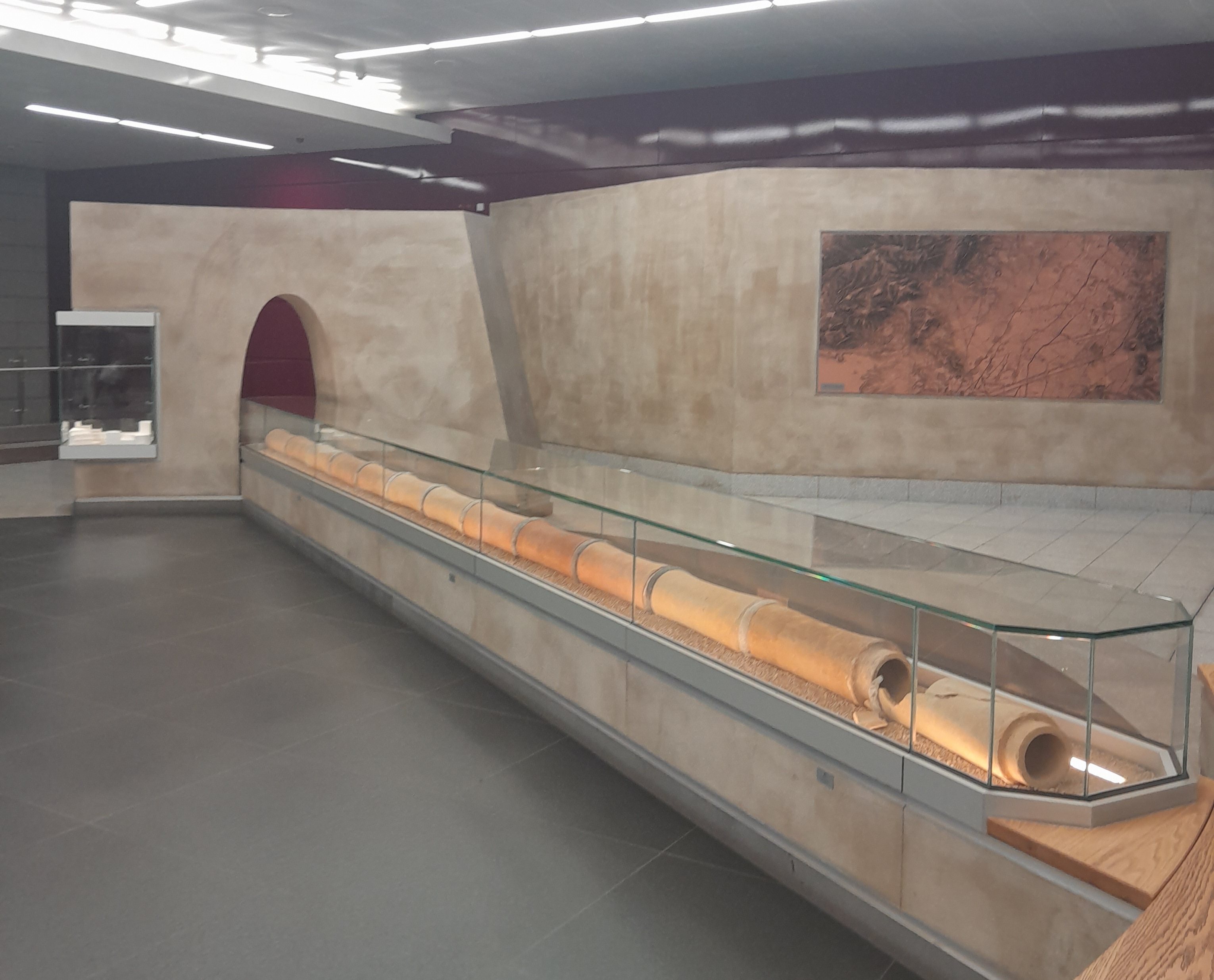
Ancient pipeline found during construction and exhibited on the station's concourse level

== Nearby points of interest ==
- Agia Eleousa church
- Agia Varvara town hall
- Mitera grove

== Station layout ==
G Ground	-	Exits
C Concourse	Concourse	Customer Service, Tickets
P Platforms	Side platform, doors will open on the right
P Platforms	Platform 1	← towards Dimotiko Theatro (Korydallos)
P Platforms	Platform 2	→ towards Athens Airport (Agia Marina) →
P Platforms	Side platform, doors will open on the right
