= Assyrians in Greece =

Assyrians in the country of Greece

ܣܘܪ̈ܝܐ ܕܝܘܢ Ασσύριοι στην Ελλάδα
- (Assyrian homeland) (Greece)

Total population
- 6,000

Regions with significant populations

Languages
- Neo-Aramaic and Greek

Religion
- Syriac Christianity

Assyrians in Greece (Syriac: ܣܘܪ̈ܝܐ ܕܝܘܢ) (Greek: Ασσύριοι στην Ελλάδα) include migrants of Assyrian descent living in Greece. The Assyrian community in Greece is primarily composed of individuals who migrated due to political, religious, and ethnic persecution in their countries of origin, particularly in Iraq, Turkey, Iran, and Syria. The number of Assyrians in Greece is estimated at around 6,000 people.

== History and distribution ==
The modern history of the Assyrians in Greece dates back to the 1920s, particularly during the period of the Assyrian genocide (1914–1920) when a number of Assyrians fled the Ottoman Empire to escape violence and persecution. Following the genocide, a number of Assyrians settled in various parts of the Middle East, and a significant portion later migrated to Greece. The Assyrians who were settled in Greece formed the Assyrian Federation of Greece to represent their community and advocate for the rights and needs. This organisation was officially recognised by the Greek state in 1934.

More Assyrian refugees, particularly in the 1980s and 1990s, later arrived from Turkey, Iran, Iraq and Syria due to instability in those countries and using Greece as an immigration bridge to western and northern European countries, like Germany and Sweden, where it is possible to get easier access to asylum and social benefits.

Currently there are more than 6,000 Assyrians in Greece, around 1,000 of them are naturalised while most of the rest live in limbo with no permit. These areas have become home to various Assyrian cultural organizations and churches, which serve as centers for community life and spiritual practices. The ethnic Assyrians are mostly concentrated in suburbs of Athens, mainly in the Egaleo and Kalamaki.

== Religion and Cultural Identity ==
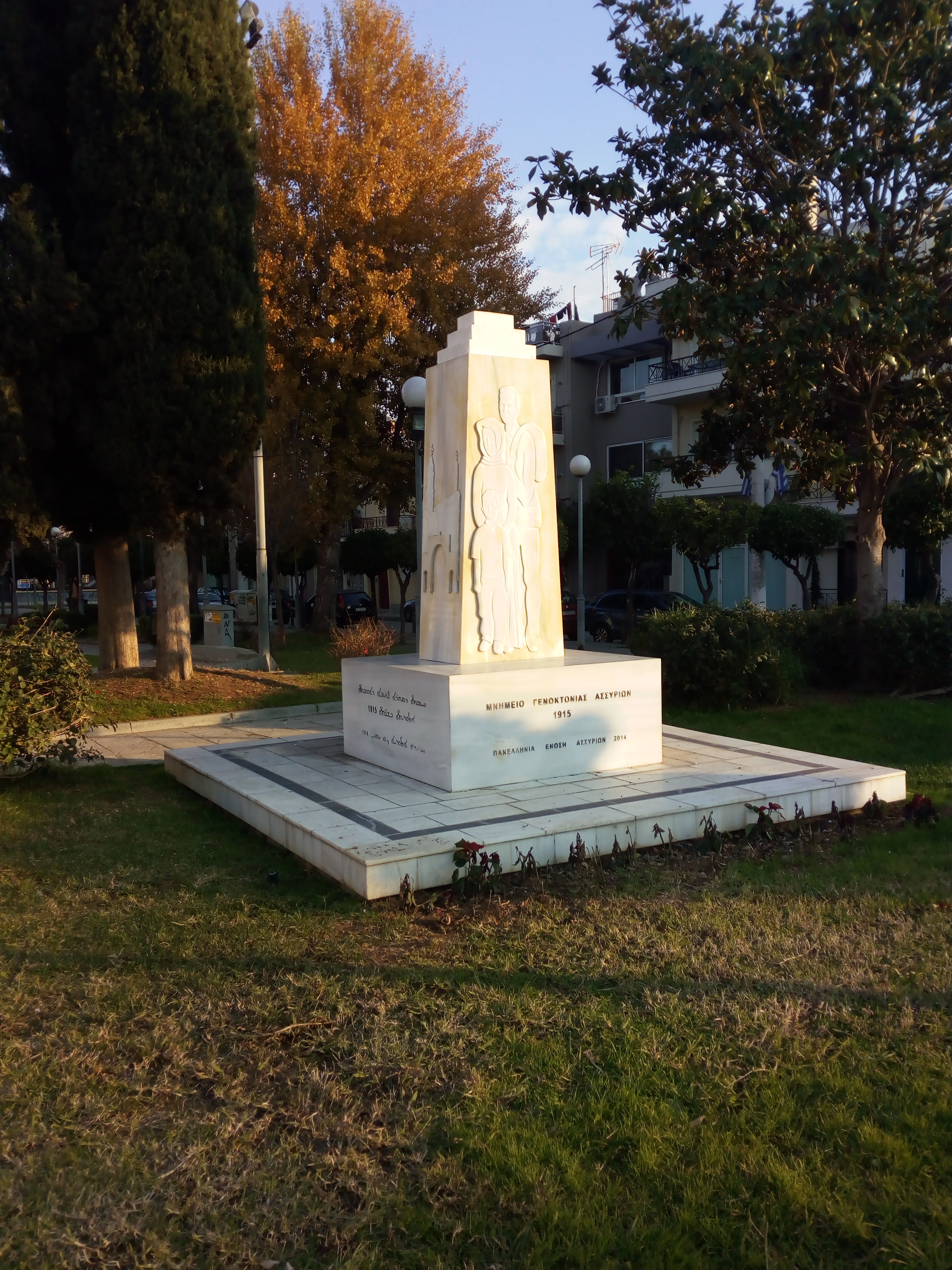
Assyrian genocide monument in Athens

The Assyrian community in Greece is predominantly Christian, with the majority adhering to the Assyrian Church of the East, the Chaldean Catholic Church, or the Syriac Orthodox Church. Religious life is central to the community, with many Assyrian Christians participating in church services, festivals, and cultural events that preserve their Assyrian heritage.

Assyrians in Greece also maintain a strong sense of cultural identity through various community-based organizations, including cultural centres and media outlets that aim to promote and preserve Assyrian language, traditions, and history. These institutions also serve as gathering points for Assyrian refugees and their descendants to connect with their roots and maintain a sense of belonging. In terms of language, Assyrian Neo-Aramaic remains widely spoken among the community, especially within households and religious settings, alongside Greek, which is increasingly adopted by younger generations for practical purposes.

== See also ==
- Assyrians in Austria
- Assyrians in Finland
- Assyrians in France
- Assyrians in Germany
- Assyrians in the Netherlands
- Assyrians in Sweden
- Assyrian diaspora
