= A.O. Spiros Louis =

Greek athletics club

Athlitikos Omilos Spiros Louis Korydallou-Nikaias-Peiraia-Keratsiniou
- Sport: Athletics
- Founded: 1995
- Based in: Piraeus
- Colors: Red, white

Athlitikos Omilos Spiros Louis Korydallou-Nikaias (Athletic Club of Korydallos and Nikaia "Spiros Louis"), more commonly known as A.O. Spiros Louis (Greek: Α.Ο. Σπύρος Λούης) is a Greek athletics club based in Piraeus, Attica, Greece.

== History ==
A.O. Spiros Louis was founded in 1995 by a group of friends, former athletics champions, who lived in the same neighbourhood of Nikaia, Piraeus. Until 2001 the club excelled in Regional Club and Greek championships, training at the (dirt-covered, at the time) Korydallos National Sports Centre. From 2001 to 2007 the club focused more on cultural and artistic events than competition, which was restricted to a small group of champions. Since 2008 the club expanded its activities further than the Korydallos and Nikaia suburbs, to the Tambouria bourough and the Themistokleio stadium, selecting youth talents from 30 schools in the greater Piraeus area. This way, more than 400 kids joined the club at the first year of its new start.

== Colours and crest ==
The official club colours are red and white (although, the club has used many colours ranging from light blue in 2007 to crimson in 2020). The emblem of the club is a horseshoe-shaped running track surrounded by two laurel wreaths inside a red circle and the official name of the club in white Greek capital letters (Α.Ο. ΣΠΥΡΟΣ ΛΟΥΗΣ ΚΟΡΥΔΑΛΛΟΥ-ΝΙΚΑΙΑΣ) running along the circle.

== Notable athletes ==
Vaios Karras, Greek national U18 record holder in 3000 metres indoor
