= Korydallos metro station =

Athens Metro station

Κορυδαλλός Korydallos
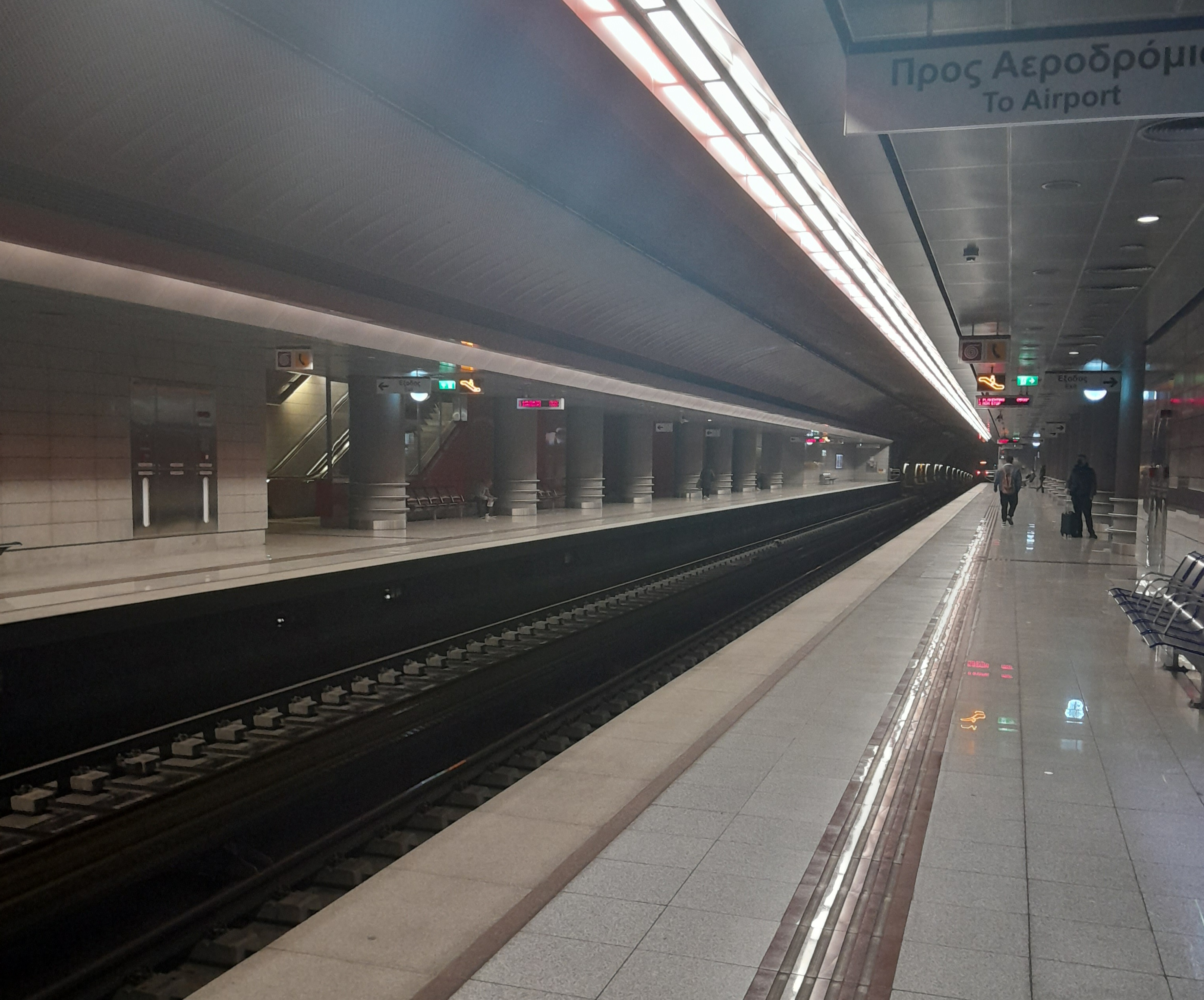
- Station platforms, February 2023

General information
- Location: 181 20 Korydallos; Greece
- Coordinates: 37.97705°N 23.650405°E
- Manager: STASY
- Line: Athens Metro Line 3
- Platforms: 2
- Tracks: 2

Construction
- Structure type: Underground
- Accessible: Yes

Key dates
- 7 July 2020: Opened

Services
| Preceding station | Athens Metro | Following station |
|---|---|---|
| Nikaia towards Dimotiko Theatro | Line 3 | Agia Varvara towards Athens Airport |
Location

Korydallos (Greek: Κορυδαλλός) is a station on Athens Metro Line 3. A part of the Piraeus extension, construction on the station began in 2012 and it opened on July 7, 2020, along with the extension's phase I to Nikaia.

== Location ==
The station is located underneath Eleftherias square in Korydallos.

== Station description ==
The station can be accessed by two ground-level entrances, both of which are glass-covered and lead to the concourse level. The concourse level is rectangular, daylight-penetrated by a single circular shaft on the ceiling, with vermilion and grey walls. The concourse level's ceiling is grey in the middle and vermilion on the sides, with small circular lamps that resemble stars. The platforms are on a northeast-southwest axis and each platform's decoration is divided in three sections. The north and south sides' walls are covered with polished granite blocks. In the middle section the platforms are slightly wider, the ceiling is supported by cylindrical pillars and the walls are covered with vermilion metal panels. The ceiling is grey and the part above the tracks is covered with curved vermilion metal panels.

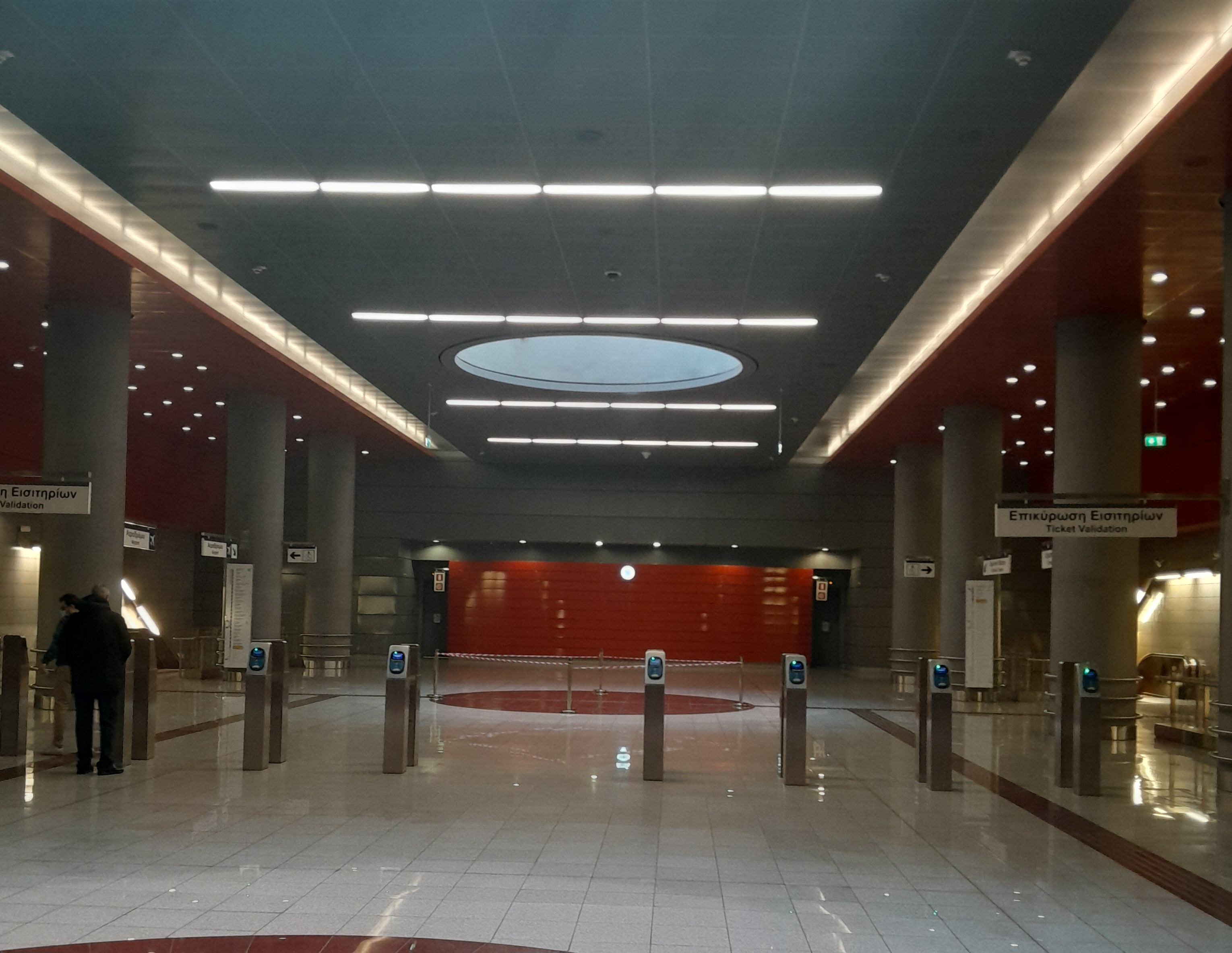
The station's concourse level

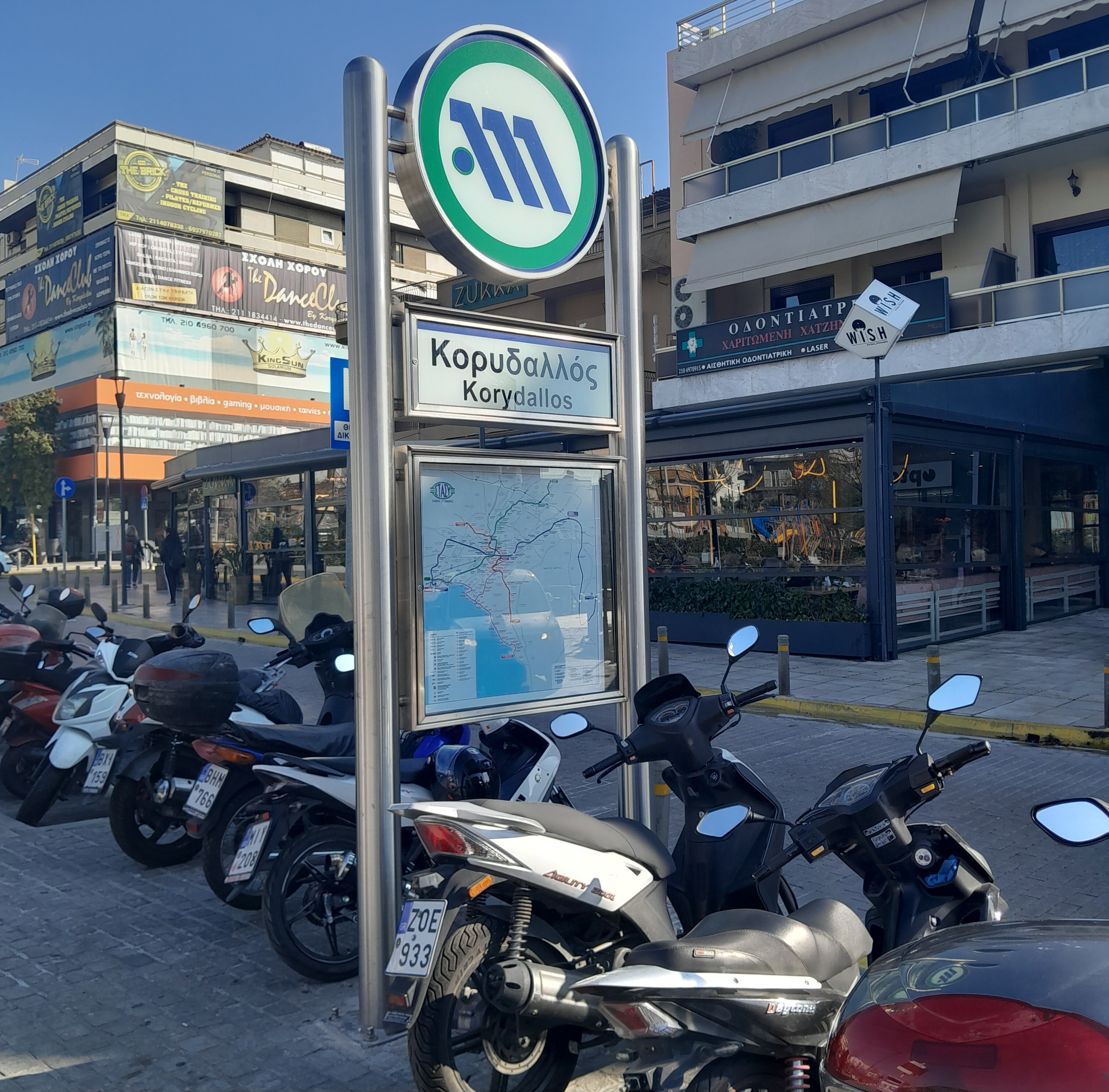
Entrance sign on Eleftherias square

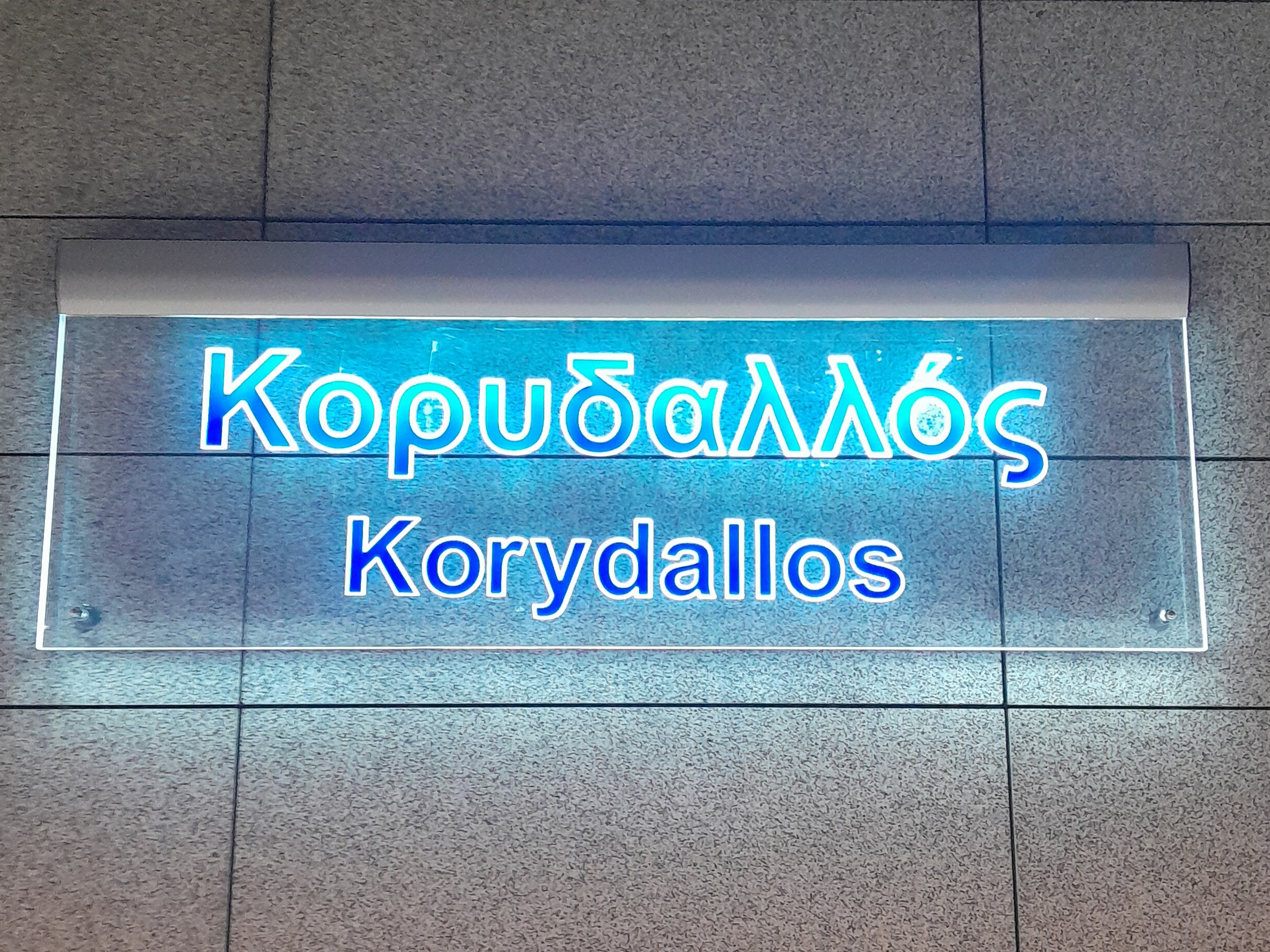
Sign on the station's platform

== Exits ==
| Exit | Location | Image | Accessibility | Coordinates |
|---|---|---|---|---|
| | Eleftherias Sq. | | | 37°58′37″N 23°39′03″E |
| | Agiou Georgiou Str. | | | 37°58′40″N 23°39′01″E |

== Nearby points of interest ==
- Eleftherias Sq.
- Korydallos prison

== Station layout ==
| G Ground | - | Exits |
| C Concourse | Concourse | Customer Service, Tickets |
| P Platforms | Side platform, doors will open on the right |
| P Platforms | Platform 1 | ← towards Dimotiko Theatro (Nikaia) |
| P Platforms | Platform 2 | → towards Athens Airport (Agia Varvara) → |
| P Platforms | Side platform, doors will open on the right |
