= Agia Marina metro station =

Athens Metro station

Αγία Μαρίνα Agia Marina
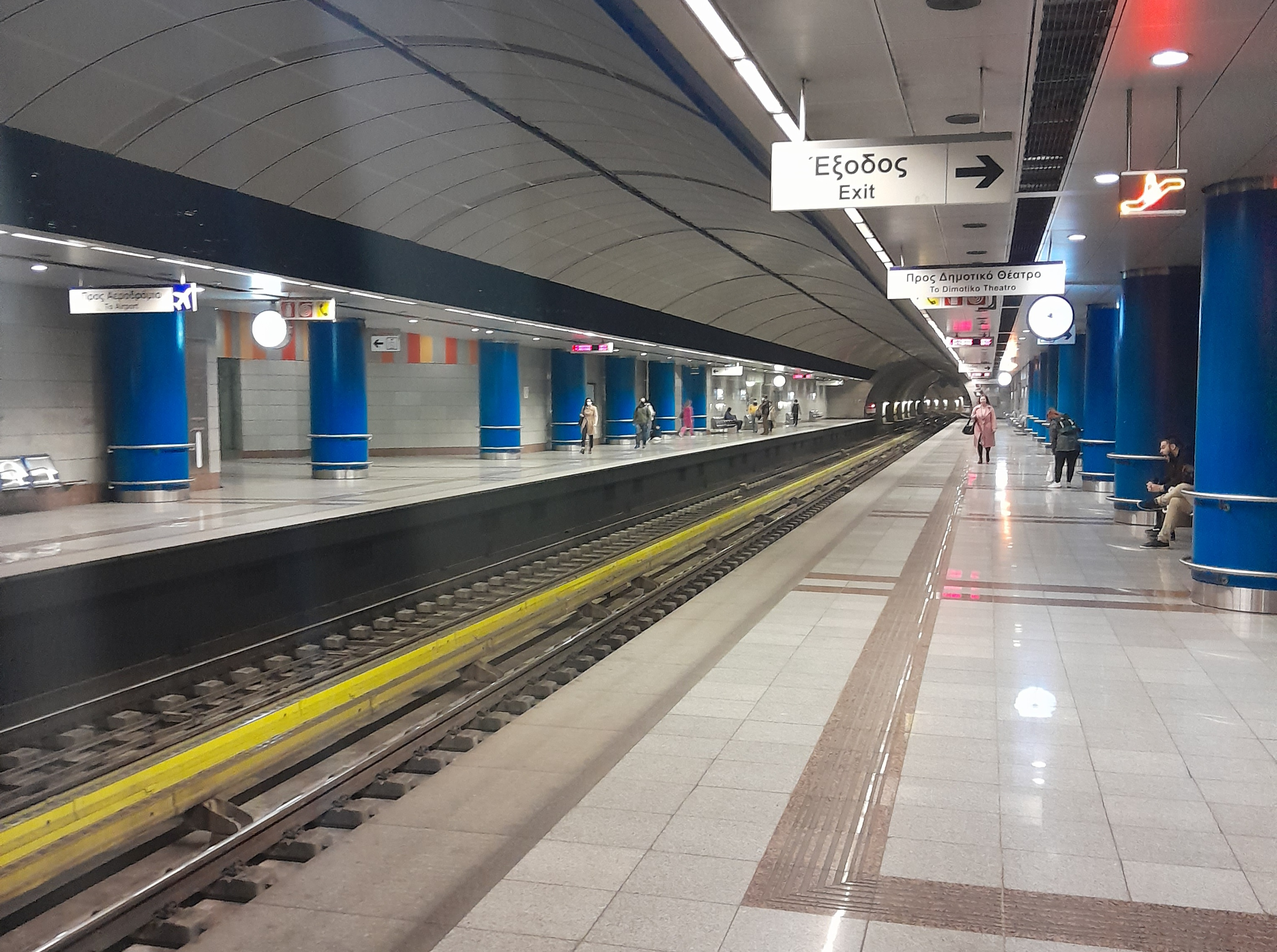
- Station's platforms, February 2023

General information
- Location: Iera Odos & Agias Marinas; 123 51 Agia Varvara; Greece
- Coordinates: 37°59′49″N 23°40′04″E
- Manager: STASY
- Line: Athens Metro Line 3
- Platforms: 2
- Tracks: 2

Construction
- Structure type: Underground
- Parking: Yes
- Cycle facilities: Yes
- Accessible: Yes

History
- Former names: Chaidari (during planning)

Key dates
- 14 December 2013: Opened

Services
| Preceding station | Athens Metro | Following station |
|---|---|---|
| Agia Varvara towards Dimotiko Theatro | Line 3 | Egaleo towards Athens Airport |
Location

Agia Marina (Greek: Αγία Μαρίνα) is an underground metro station in Athens, Greece. The station has park-and-ride facilities. A part of the Piraeus extension, construction works on the station began in 2007, before the rest of the extension. This station was originally called Chaidari, but it was later changed to Agia Marina. It was expected to become operational by 2010 but was delayed several times due to the Siemens Greek bribery scandal. The station opened to the public on 14 December 2013 and served as the line's western terminus until 2020.

== Location ==
The station is located underneath Iera Odos, outside the Egaleo town hall. It is located on the border of Egaleo and Agia Varvara municipalities and also close to the Haidari municipality (Astythea).

== Station description ==
The station can be accessed by two ground-level entrances, both of which have granite-covered walls and a glass ceiling and lead to the concourse level. The south entrance also bears a blue glass-covered pergola in front of it. The concourse level is rectangular, with granite-covered walls and blue cylindrical columns. One of the walls is covered with rectangular tiles coloured red, yellow and orange. The concourse level's ceiling is grey with two parallel blue stripes above the blue columns. The platforms are on an east–west axis and each platform's decoration is divided in two sections. The east sides' walls are covered with polished granite blocks. In the west sides the platforms are slightly wider, the ceiling is supported by cylindrical blue pillars and the walls are also covered with polished granite tiles. The ceiling is white with two blue stripes above each platform's edge and the part above the tracks is covered with curved white metal panels.

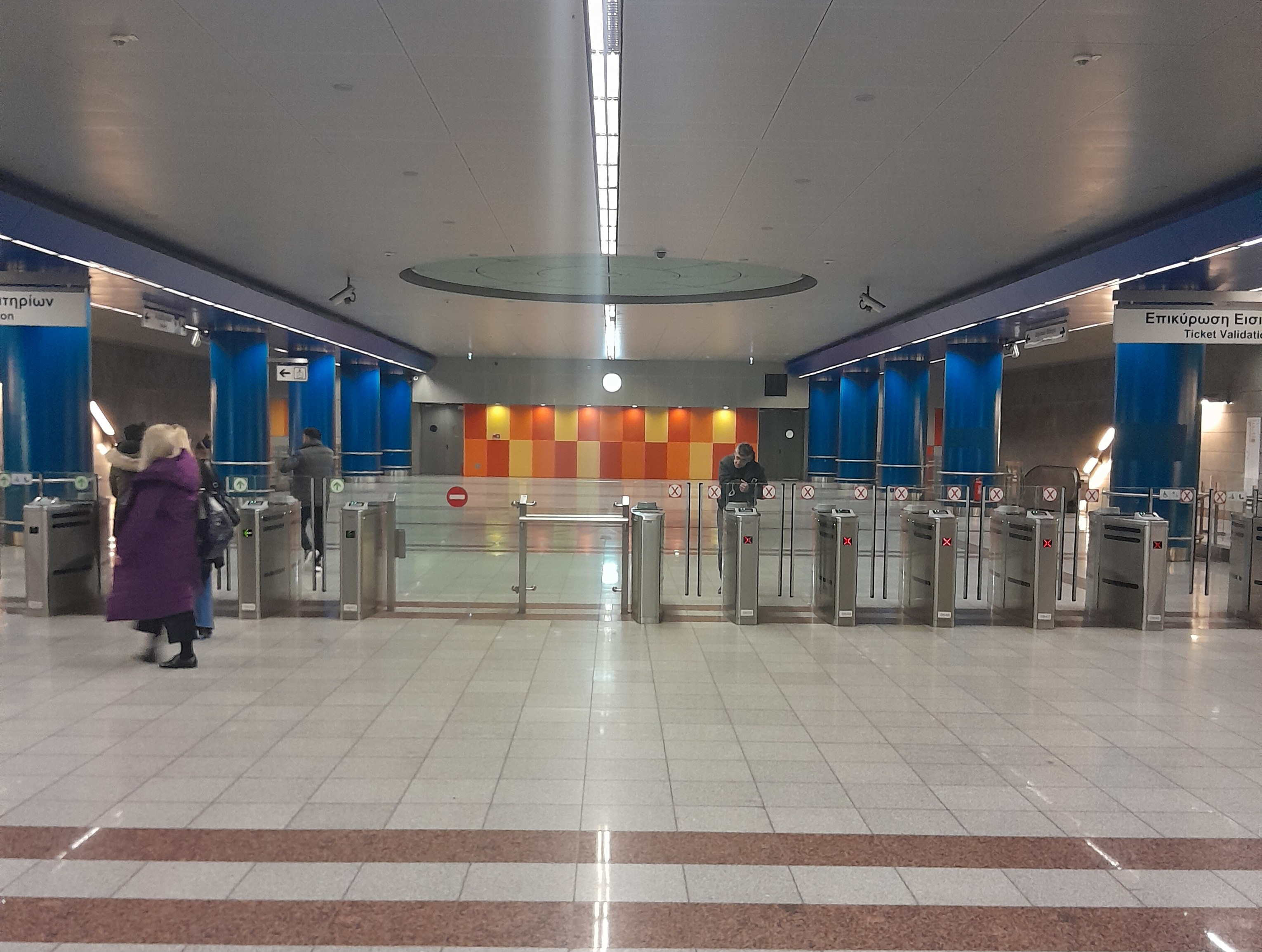
The station's concourse level

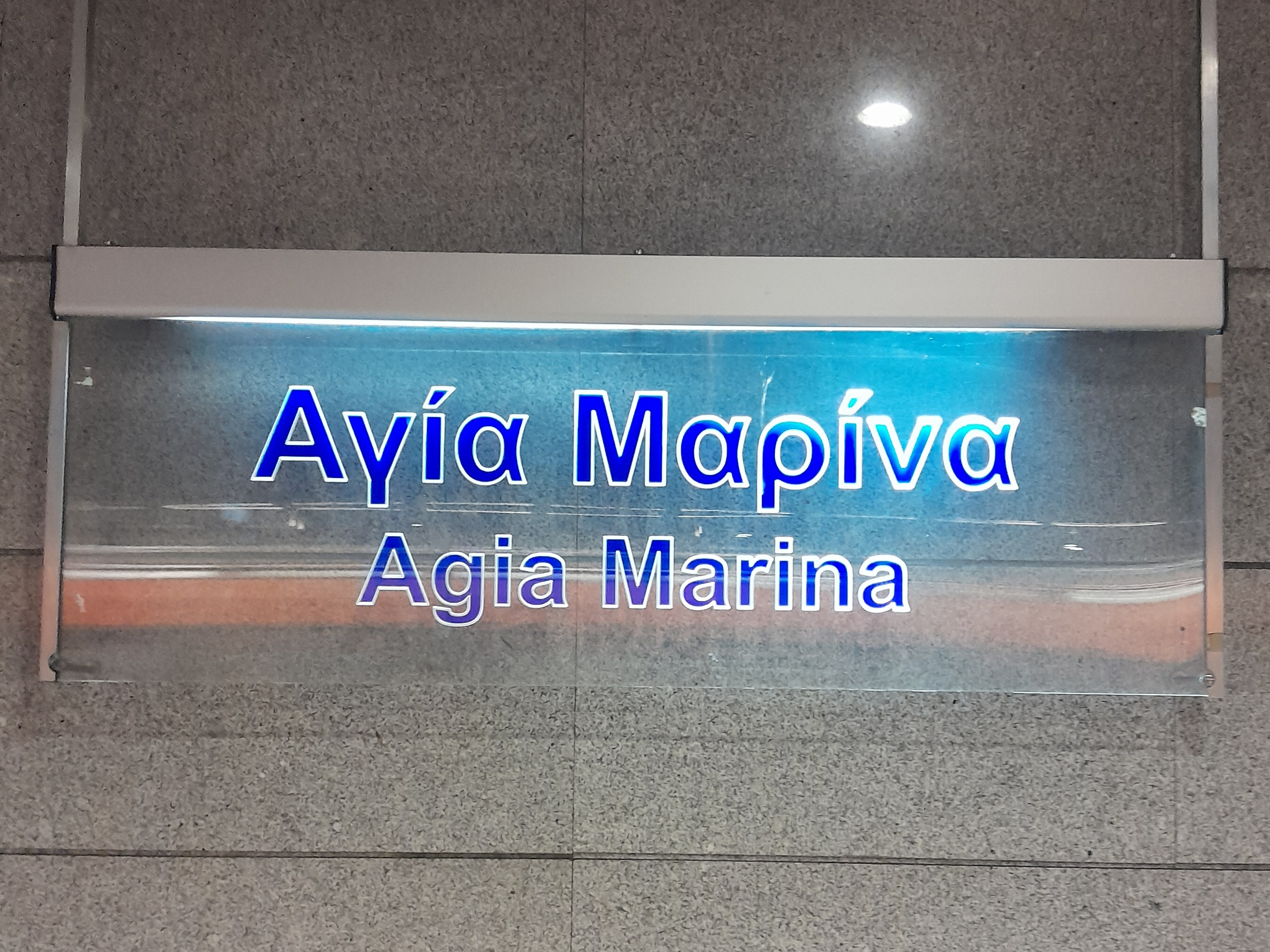
Sign at the station's platforms

== Exits ==
| Exit | Location | Image | Accessibility | Coordinates |
|---|---|---|---|---|
| | Iera Odos/Ag. Marinas Str. | | | 37°59′49″N 23°40′03″E |
| | Iera Odos/Kalvou Str. | | | 37°59′51″N 23°40′04″E |

== Antiquities ==
Parts of an ancient pipeline were discovered during the station's construction. The pipeline is exhibited on the concourse level.

== Bus Connections ==
Agia Marina serves as a hub for local buses of west Attica. Only stops that are within 200m. from any of the station's exits are listed. Special bus routes are not included.

| Stop | Route | | Coordinates |
| Stop | Number | Destination | Coordinates |
|---|---|---|---|
| Agia Marina Station | 803 | Dasos | 37.997793°N 23.667300°E |
| Agia Marina Station | 811 | Chaidari | 37.997793°N 23.667300°E |
| Agia Marina Station | 837 | Agia Varvara | 37.997793°N 23.667300°E |
| Agia Marina Station | 866 | Aspropyrgos | 37.997793°N 23.667300°E |
| Agia Marina Station | 876 | Elefsina | 37.997793°N 23.667300°E |
| Agia Marina Station | 803 | Piraeus | 37.997419°N 23.667470°E |
| Agia Marina Station | 837 | Agia Marina | 37.997419°N 23.667470°E |
| Agia Marina Station | 866 | Agia Marina | 37.997419°N 23.667470°E |
| Agia Marina Station | 876 | Agia Marina | 37.997419°N 23.667470°E |
| Agia Marina Station | 891 | Attiki | 37.997419°N 23.667470°E |
| Agia Marina Station | 892 | Agia Varvara | 37.997419°N 23.667470°E |
| 1st Agias Marinas | 837 | Agia Marina | 37.996164°N 23.667073°E |
| 1st Agias Marinas | 866 | Agia Marina | 37.996164°N 23.667073°E |
| 1st Agias Marinas | 876 | Agia Marina | 37.996164°N 23.667073°E |
| 1st Agias Marinas | 891 | Agia Varvara | 37.996164°N 23.667073°E |
| 1st Agias Marinas | 892 | Agia Varvara | 37.996164°N 23.667073°E |

== Station layout ==
| G Ground | - | Exits |
| C Concourse | Concourse | Customer Service, Tickets |
| P Platforms | Side platform, doors will open on the right |
| P Platforms | Platform 1 | ← towards Dimotiko Theatro (Agia Varvara) |
| P Platforms | Platform 2 | → towards Athens Airport (Egaleo) → |
| P Platforms | Side platform, doors will open on the right |
