= Agia Varvara =

Agia Varvara Αγία Βαρβάρα
- Municipality
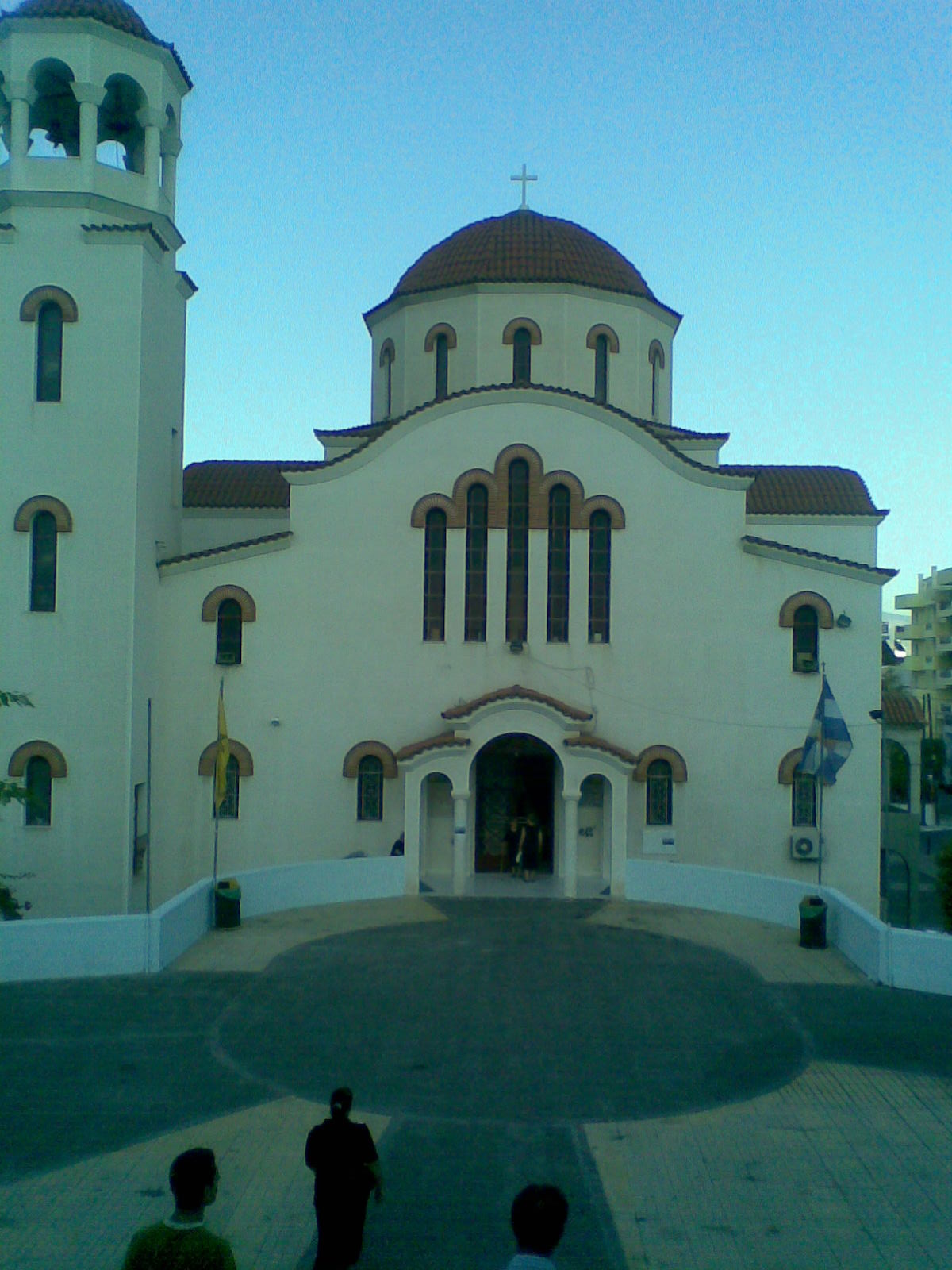
- Prophet Elias church in Agia Varvara

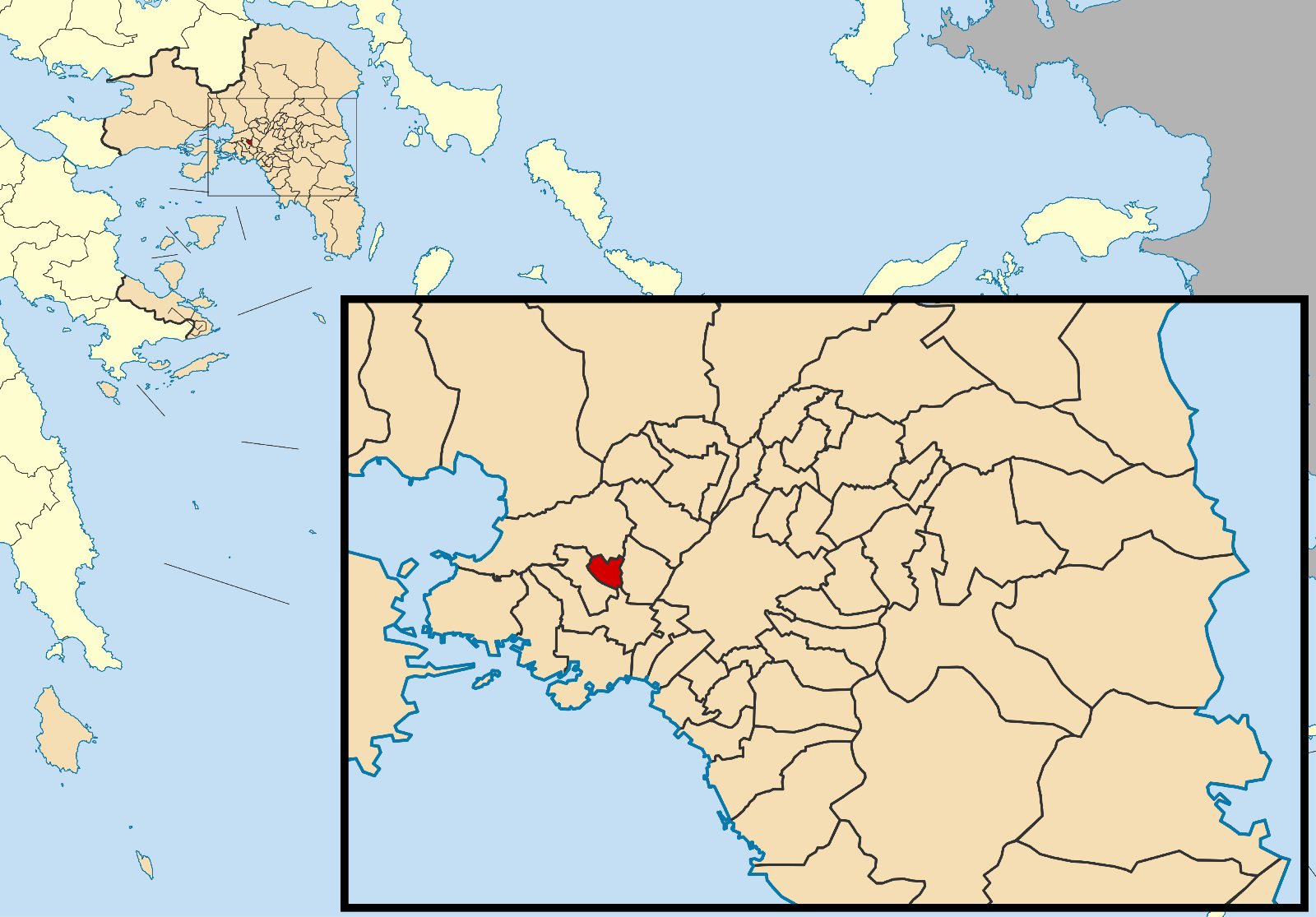

- Location within Greece
- Coordinates: 38°00′N 23°39′E
- Country: Greece
- Administrative region: Attica
- Regional unit: West Athens

Government
  - Mayor: Lampros Michos (since 2019)

Area
  - Municipality: 2.425 km^{2} (0.936 sq mi)
- Elevation: 70 m (230 ft)

Population (2021)
  - Municipality: 26,759
  - Density: 11,030/km^{2} (28,580/sq mi)
- Time zone: UTC+2 (EET)
  - Summer (DST): UTC+3 (EEST)
- Postal code: 123 51
- Area code: 210
- Vehicle registration: Z
- Website: www.agiavarvara.gr

Agia Varvara (Greek: Αγία Βαρβάρα, meaning Saint Barbara) is a suburban town in the western part of the Athens agglomeration in Attica, Greece, and a municipality in the West Athens regional unit.

== Geography ==
Agia Varvara is situated east of the mountain Aigaleo (Greek: Αιγάλεω). It is 6 km (4 mi) west of central Athens. The municipality has an area of 2.425 km^{2}. It is served by the Agia Varvara and Agia Marina stations on Line 3 of the Athens Metro. In terms of academic institutions, the area contains 2 campuses of West Attica University which in total includes approx 60,000 students according to 2023.

== History ==
The Roma community in Agia Varvara originated from Constantinople and were refugees from the Greek–Turkish population exchange (1923). Over time, the Roma refugees sought to create a refuge for themselves and several families settled at Drapetsona, a site north of Piraeus; others went to Kato Petralona, a refugee neighbourhood of Athens, while housing initially consisted of tents, later huts and sheds.

The site of Agia Varvara was the location of a psychiatric hospital amid bare wilderness until the mid-1930s when 50 Roma families settled in the area. Agia Varvara was on the periphery of the developed municipalities and lacked transport and utility services. The locality was initially composed of tents, later replaced by permanent structures like shacks as dispersed Roma refugees from Drapetsona, Kato Petralona and Salonica resettled there. The settlement grew as Pontian Greeks and internal rural Greek migrants settled during the 1950s and 1960s. Toward the late 20th century, Agia Varvara was a working class suburb.

== Demographics ==
Year	Population
1981	29,259
1991	28,706
2001	30,562
2011	26,550
2021	26,759

The Roma of Agia Varvara originate from Constantinople. In the early 20th century, they were a non-practising Christian transient population who spoke no Greek, living and working alongside the Christian community of the city. They were grouped with the Christian Greeks and sent to Greece as a consequence of the Greek–Turkish population exchange (1923). The Roma refugees became dispersed and families were separated, with some residing in Salonica and Piraeus, while all experienced difficult living and health conditions, economic hardship, food and housing insecurity during the interwar period. Due to scarce resources for refugees, discrimination from non-Roma refugees, and lack of assistance from the government, the Roma refugees adapted to their new situation and revived previous professions of hawking, barter trade, and fortune-telling.

While actively seeking to reunite their separated families, displaced Roma refugee populations initially established several temporary communities made of tents and crude huts in Drapetsona near Piraeus, Kato Petralona in Athens, and Salonica. During the mid-1930s, 50 families permanently resettled into the completely isolated, unserviced wilderness of Agia Varvara, where they gradually replaced their initial tents with more permanent living structures such as shacks. Agia Varvara was inhabited only by Roma, who lived isolated from the wider Greek population. Their status was alothapi akathoristi (undetermined foreigners) until the Greek government recognised them with Greek national identity in 1937.

In the 1950s and 1960s, Pontian Greeks and internal rural Greek migrants settled in Agia Varvara. During this time, the Roma of Agia Varvara underwent profound changes as they gained ownership of land and residentially coexisted with the Greek population, leading to their integration into Greek society and viewing Greece as their country. The Roma formed their own local organisation to engage with the Greek state over housing and welfare issues. In the 1980s, some Roma worked as hawkers selling goods throughout Athens, while others spent time seasonally in other areas of Greece.

In the late 20th century, the Roma were a settled population in Agia Varvara. They formed 8–10 per cent of the suburb's inhabitants, and this community consisted of some 500 families, totalling 3,000 people. The Roma of Agia Varvara distinguish themselves from local Roma and highlight their (Christian) refugee pedigree for interethnic and government relations. They use terms for themselves such as refugees, Roma, Athigani and Tsigani with somewhat positive connotations, unlike Yifti (Gypsy), a Greek word used for Roma that is associated with negative traits. Greeks distinguish the settled urban Roma of Agia Varvara from other nomadic Roma. In the modern period, the acculturated and integrated Roma of Agia Varvara speak Greek, are Orthodox, have Greek names, follow Greek residential and inheritance norms, attend Greek education, and formally consider themselves as Greeks. They are socially and officially tolerated within Greece and belong to the highest socio-economic strata of the Roma population in the country. Some issues of discrimination and perceptions of the community as Yifti still persist among wider Greek society.
