= Nikaia metro station =

Athens Metro station

Νίκαια Nikaia
- Station platforms, February 2023

General information
- Location: 184 50 Nikaia; Greece
- Coordinates: 37.965713°N 23.647418°E
- Manager: STASY
- Line: Athens Metro Line 3
- Platforms: 2
- Tracks: 2

Construction
- Structure type: Underground
- Accessible: Yes

Key dates
- 7 July 2020: Opened

Services
Preceding station	Athens Metro	Following station
Maniatika towards Dimotiko Theatro	Line 3	Korydallos towards Athens Airport
Location

Nikaia (Greek: Νίκαια), shown as Nikea on the official map, is a station on Athens Metro Line 3. A part of the Piraeus extension, the station opened on July 7, 2020, along with Phase I of the extension. It served as the line's western terminus until 2022.

== Location ==
The station is located under Eleftheriou Venizelou Square in Nikaia.

== Station description ==
The station can be accessed by three ground-level entrances, one of which is glass-covered. All of the entrances lead to the concourse level. The concourse level is rectangular, daylight-penetrated by a single rectangular shaft on the ceiling, with white walls. The concourse level's ceiling is triangular and coloured vermilion. The platforms are on a northeast-southwest axis and each platform's decoration is divided in two sections. The north side's walls are covered with curved white metal panels. In the south section the platforms are slightly wider, the ceiling is supported by white cylindrical pillars and the walls are covered with blue metal panels. The southern tip of the platforms is covered with polished granite tiles. The ceiling is white and the part above the tracks is covered with curved white metal panels.

The station's concourse level

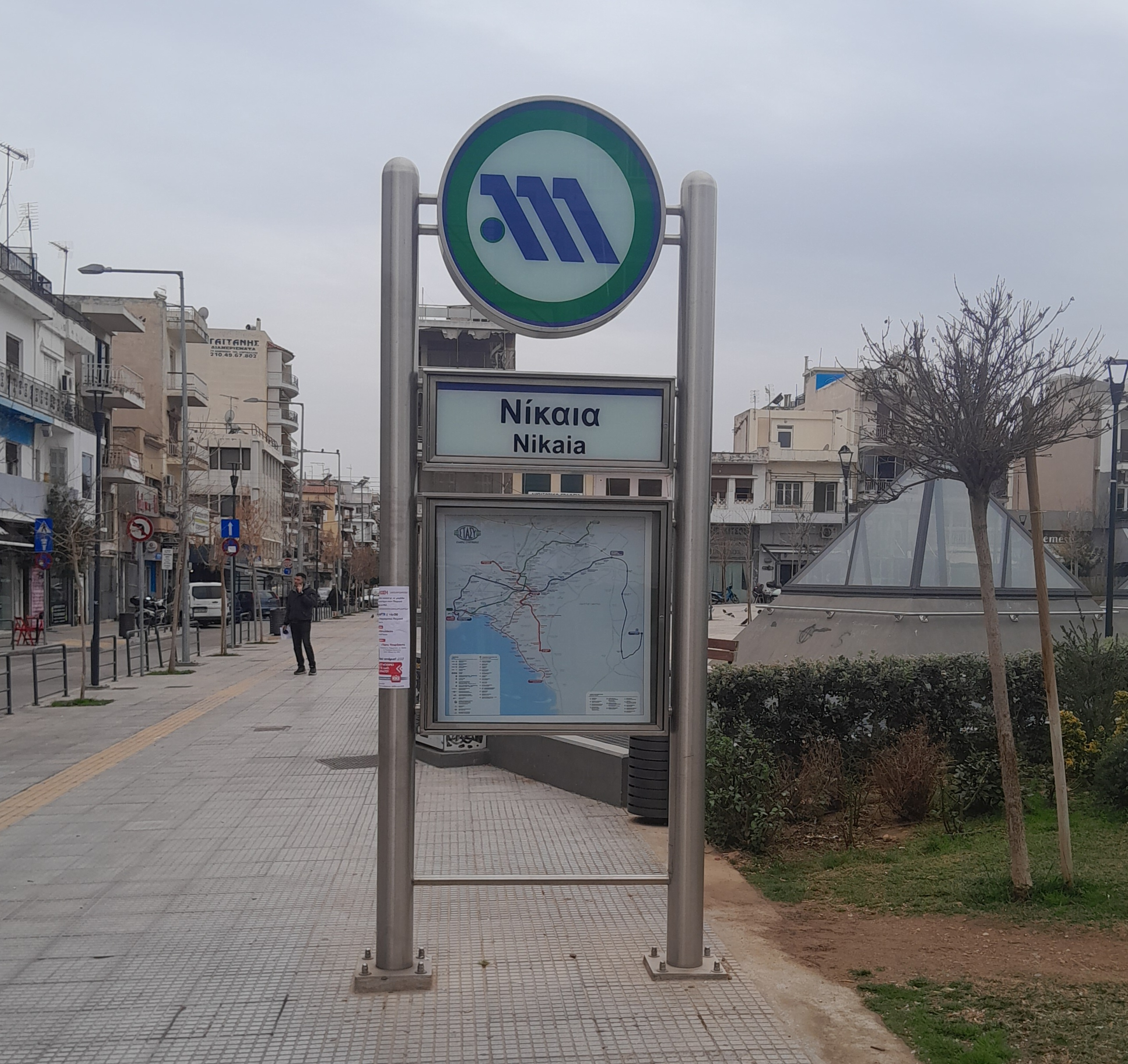
Entrance sign on El. Venizelou Sq.

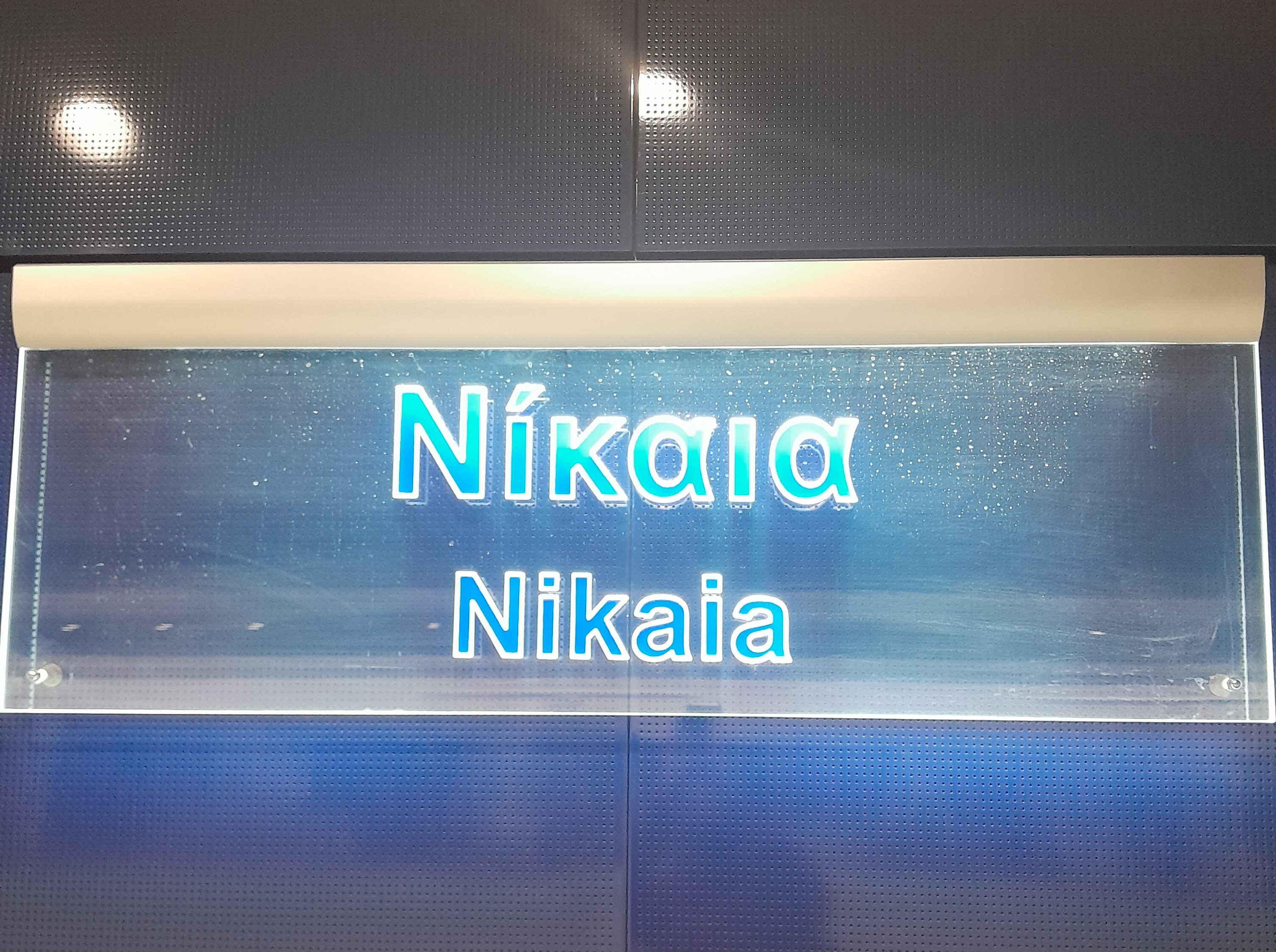
Sign at the station's platforms

== Exits ==
Exit	Location	Image	Accessibility	Coordinates
	El. Venizelou Sq.			37.965717°N 23.647649°E
	Tsaldari Str.			37.966218°N 23.647073°E
	Karakoulouxi Str.			37.966017°N 23.647339°E

== Station layout ==
G Ground	-	Exits
C Concourse	Concourse	Customer Service, Tickets
P Platforms	Side platform, doors will open on the right
P Platforms	Platform 1	← towards Dimotiko Theatro (Maniatika)
P Platforms	Platform 2	→ towards Athens Airport (Korydallos) →
P Platforms	Side platform, doors will open on the right
