= Aigaleo massacre =

German reprisal operation in Greece, 29 September 1944

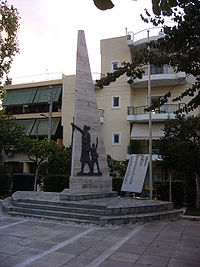
Monument to the victims of the massacre

The Aigaleo Massacre was a mass execution carried out by the Nazi occupation forces on September 29, 1944 in Agios Georgios neighborhood of Aigaleo, Attica, Greece. The official number of victims is 65, however some estimations raise the number of victims to about 100 or 150. In the site of the executions the local community has built a memorial for the victims.

== Background ==
In August 1944, Giannis Mpatzakidis, member of KKE and ELAS, was elected mayor of Aigaleo after a people's assembly in the central square of Aigaleo. The authorities appointed by the occupiers were removed and in the next day ELAS' delegates asked the local police forces to join them in the fight to protect the population against the Nazis' atrocities or to leave the city.

The Nazis, looking for a way to withdraw their forces from Athens, were trying to clear the area (west Athens) from any possible threat. This was done by unleashing a wave of terrorist action including robbery, destruction of infrastructure and murders of local people, most of the times without a specific reason.

The final excuse for a mass murder against the local population came in the morning of September 29, 1944. According to testimonies of some residents and of members of the resistance, that day a minor fight between Greek guerillas of ELAS (who according to some testimonies were two teenagers) and two German motorcyclists occurred. According to some testimonies the Germans fell into the Kifissos river (possibly injured) and managed to reach the main group of Nazi forces. According to other testimonies, a large scale fight of ELAS against the collaborationist security battalions followed. However this has been refused by ELAS. It is unclear whether in the end there were any German casualties.

== The raid ==
The same day an elite German battalion was ordered to clear the area. The first two victims were two young students, that the battalion met at the intersection of Iera Odos and Marconi streets (at the east-south east of Aigaleo). However, according to the testimony of 11 year-old Ioannis Kourousis, another German battalion reached Aigaleo from the west (from Haidari), something that has been interpreted as a fore-planned operation of trapping the locals. This is also confirmed by a letter sent by a high-ranking retired police officer to the local newspaper "Perifereiakos Typos" where it is mentioned that "the German Destruction Force stationed in Dafni was ordered to proceed in harsh retaliations". The German army entered the city and initially executed 31 unarmed citizens they randomly encountered in the streets. Afterwards they blockaded Agios Georgios neighborhood, allowing only the evacuation of some women and children. They trapped men above 15 years old in their houses and burned the houses killing the people trapped inside. About 120 houses were burned to the ground.

== Aftermath ==
The next day ELAS set up machine guns to prevent a new raid and 41 burned bodies were buried near the site of the massacre. The rest of the bodies were moved to be buried in the 3rd Athens Cemetery and in Peristeri.

The murderers and their local collaborators (there exist testimonies that some of the perpetrators spoke Greek fluently (like native speakers)) were left unpunished by the post-occupation authorities.

== Commemoration ==
On the completion of 70 years from the massacre, the community of Aigaleo scheduled a set of events named "Antifascist events - 70 years from the Massacre of Aigaleo".

In March 2001 the Union of Victims of Aigaleo Massacre was created with the purpose of making the massacre known. The union is made up of relatives of the victims and organizes or co-organizes events in memory of the tragic event.
