= Assyrians in Finland =

Ethnic group in Finland

Total population
- around 500

Regions with significant populations
- Helsinki, Oulu

Languages
- Neo-Aramaic · Finnish

Religion
- Predominantly Christianity (majority: Syriac Christianity; minority: Protestantism)

The Assyrians in Finland (Finnish: Assyrialaiset) comprises migrants of Assyrian ancestry and their descendants born in Finland.

== Demographics ==
In 2001, there were only 115 Assyrians in Finland. Within six years, the number tripled.

The majority of them living in Oulu, while other smaller communities are seen in the Finnish capital, Helsinki, and as well in Turku and Jyväskylä. They are mostly refugees from Iraq and Iran; this is in contrast to the Assyrian population in neighboring Sweden, where the majority are from Turkey, Iraq, and Syria.

The population is split religiously between Church of the East and Chaldean Catholic members. Chaldean Catholics attend a Catholic church in Oulu where the services are conducted by Italian priests in the Finnish language. Church of the East members attend their services in Lutheran churches.

== History ==
Assyrians in Finland began arriving noticeably for the first time in 1991.

In April 1994, the community in Oulu founded the social club "Assyrian Society of Finland", recognized by the Finnish government. The club organizes trips, picnics, and Assyrian cultural events, and holds bi-annual elections. Mr Paulus is the current president of the club.

== Adaptation ==
- Some Assyrians have opened Pizza restaurants with names such as Nohadra and Nineveh, referring to Assyrian cities in their homeland.
- Assyrian refugees who enjoy permanent residency status and those who have already obtained Finnish citizenship are eligible to vote in the country's elections.
- All are required to attend language classes which lasts from three to six months.
- Social services in Finland is popular among Finnish Assyrian. They usually go picnics and trips to explore the Finnish culture.

== Cuisines ==
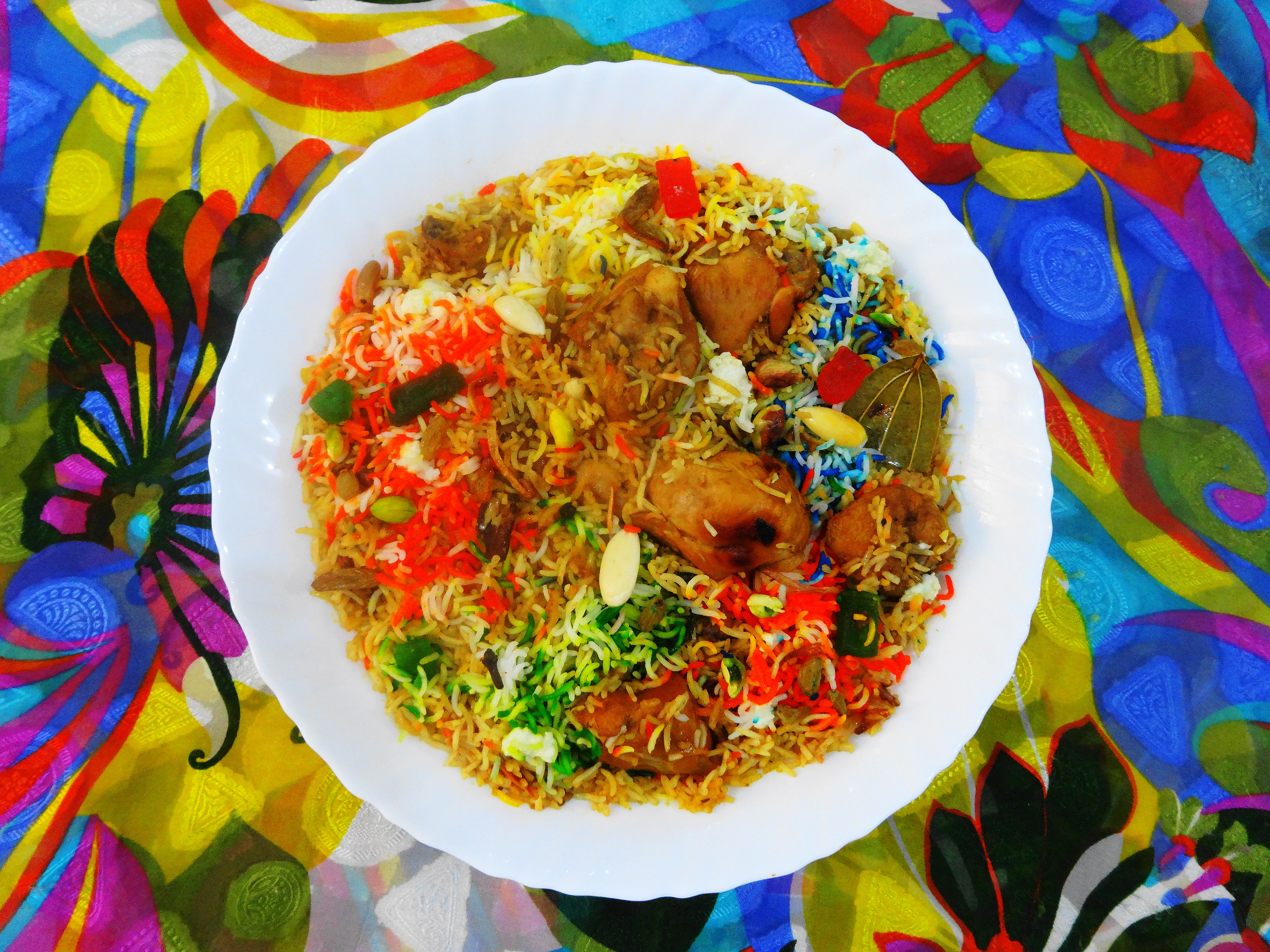
Biryani

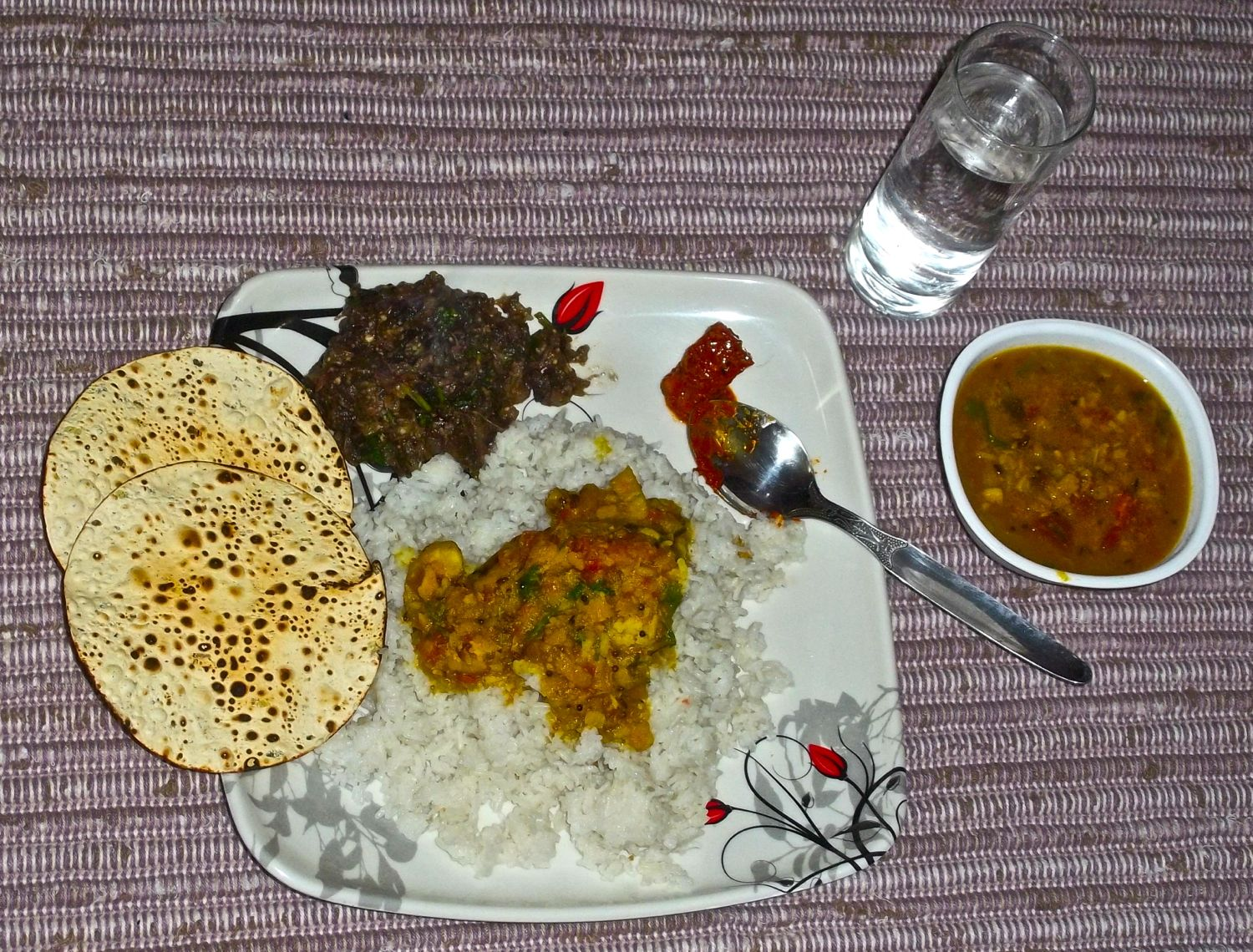
Dalma

They normally preserves their traditional food, such as Dolma, Biryani and other Assyrian dishes, to greet Finnish people.

== Festivals ==
Ladies who preserve their Orthodox Christian religion make celebrations for the anniversaries of the Orthodox Bishopics.

== Notable people ==
- Antonio Yakoub (born 2002), footballer

== See also ==
- Simo Parpola, prominent Finnish Assyriologist
