= Korydallos =

Korydallos Κορυδαλλός
- Municipality
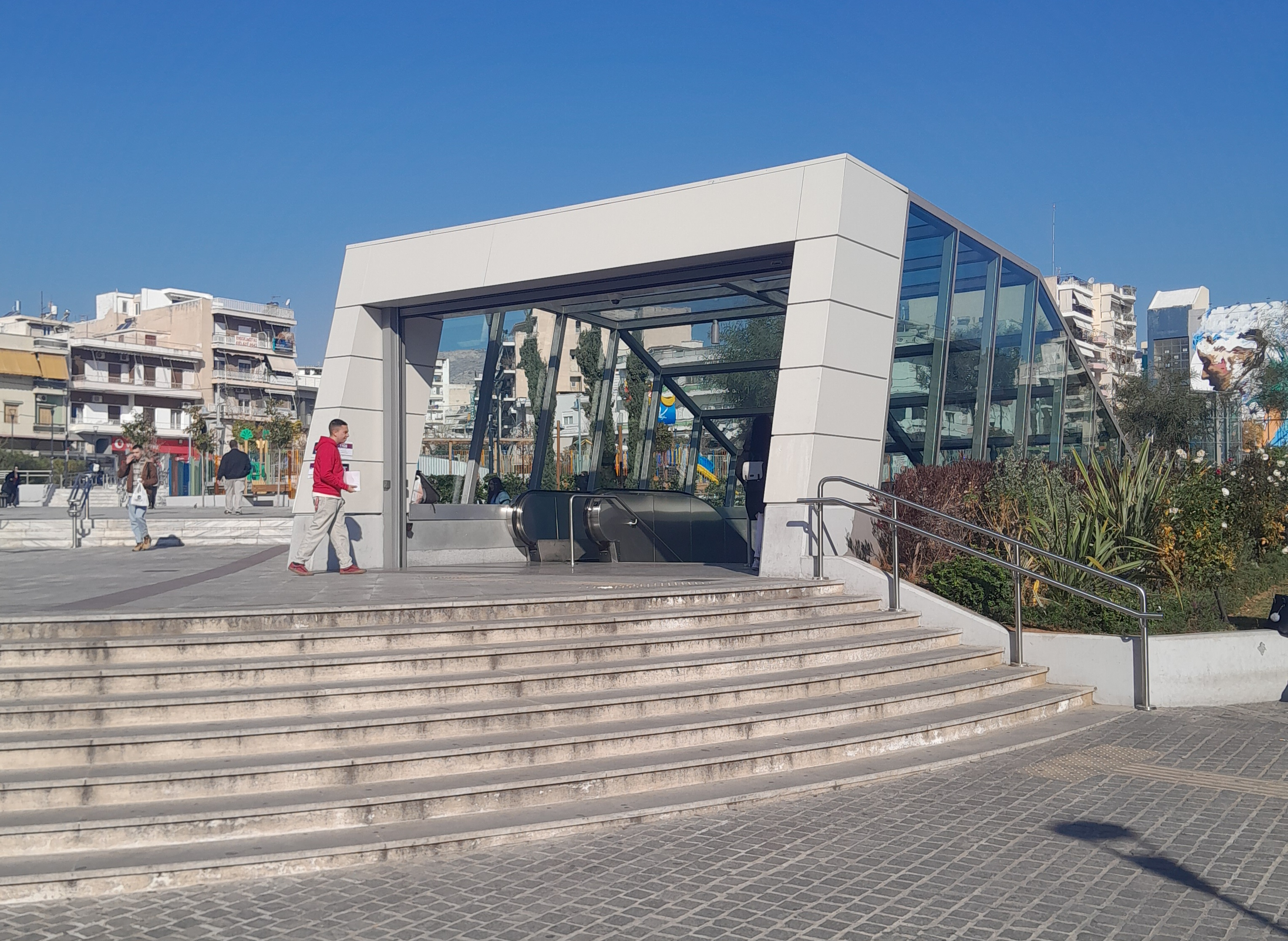
- The Korydallos metro station in Eleftherias Square

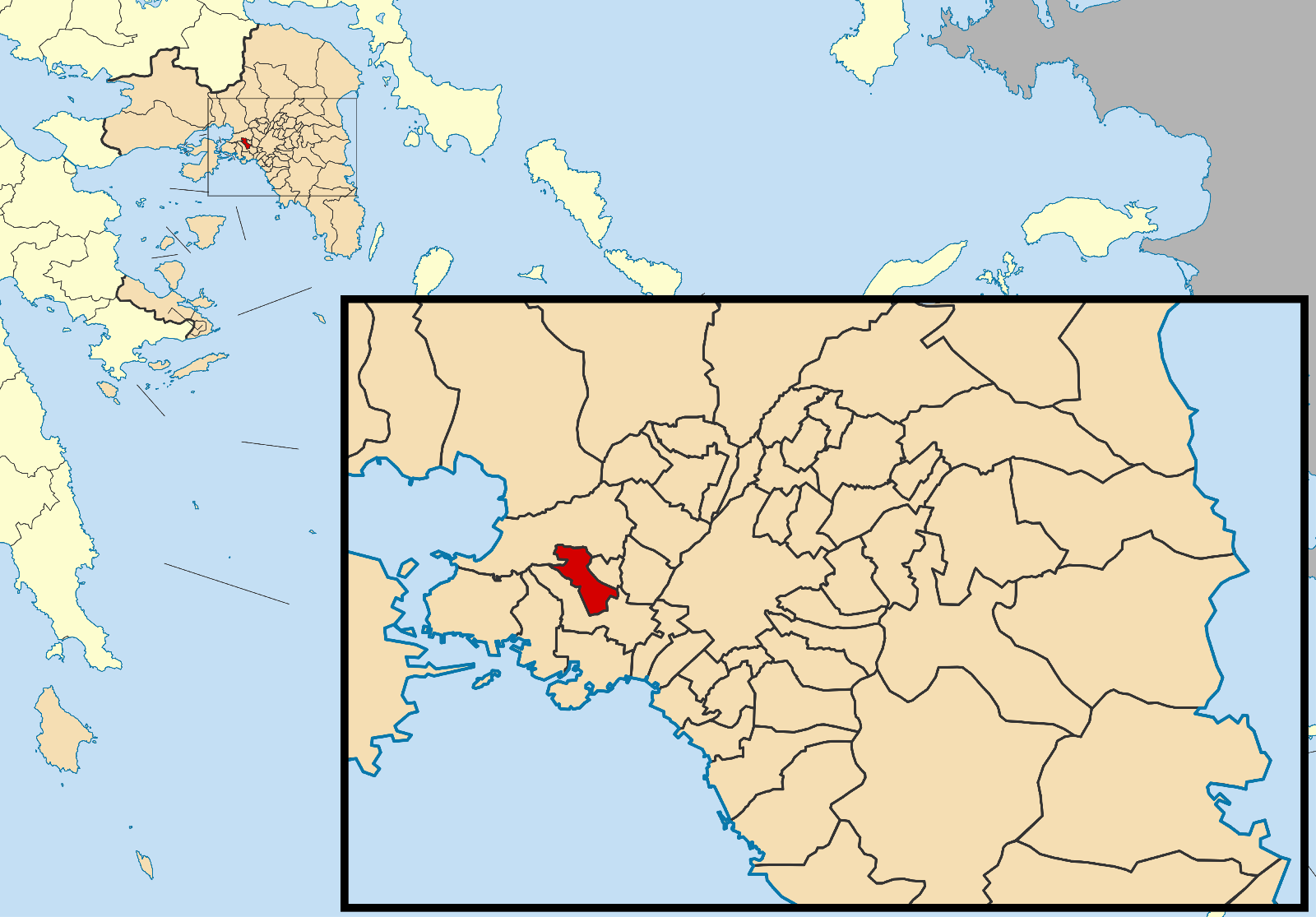

- Location within Greece
- Coordinates: 37°59′N 23°39′E
- Country: Greece
- Administrative region: Attica
- Regional unit: Piraeus

Government
  - Mayor: Nikos Choursalas (since 2019)

Area
  - Municipality: 4.324 km^{2} (1.670 sq mi)
- Elevation: 30 m (98 ft)

Population (2021)
  - Municipality: 61,248
  - Density: 14,160/km^{2} (36,690/sq mi)
- Time zone: UTC+2 (EET)
  - Summer (DST): UTC+3 (EEST)
- Postal code: 181 xx
- Area code: 210
- Vehicle registration: Z
- Website: www.korydallos.gr

Korydallos (Greek: Κορυδαλλός; Latin: Corydallus) is both a town and a municipality in the Piraeus regional unit of Greece. It is located in the southwestern part of the Attica agglomeration.

== Geography ==
Korydallos is situated southeast of the mountain Aegaleo. It is located 7 km west of Athens and 4.5 km north of Piraeus. The municipality has an area of 4.324 km^{2}. The main street Taxiarchon has become a well known shopping center with many fashion shops and boutiques. People who live there are usually middle class families or the working class.

== Transport ==
Korydallos metro station of line 3 situated in the city. Also served by busses (OSY).

== History ==
Korydallos was founded in ancient times, and was one of the 100 municipalities of ancient Athens' democratic system at the end of the 6th century BC. Theophilos Corydalleus (1563–1646) was a philosopher who lived in Korydallos. 200 years later, Korydallos was known as Koutsoukari after the property owner of the greater area, Emmanouil Koutsikaris. After that it was renamed into Pachy after the next owner (Pachinas). In 1923, the town was renamed back into its ancient name, Korydallos. The population in 1928 was 2,500. Korydallos was part of the municipality of Athens until 1931 and from 1931 to 1934 of municipality of Piraeus, when it became a separate community. It was elevated to municipality status in 1946. The city now boasts a population of 100,000.

== Historical population ==
Year	Municipality
1981	61,313
1991	63,184
2001	67,456
2011	63,445
2021	61,248

== Football teams ==
- Aetos Korydallou
- Kypros Korydallou
- Thuella Korydallou
- Ermis Korydallou
- AO Korydallou

== See also ==
- List of municipalities of Attica

== Twin towns ==
- Belváros-Lipótváros, Hungary (2025)
