= Aigaleo =

Aigaleo Αιγάλεω
- Municipality
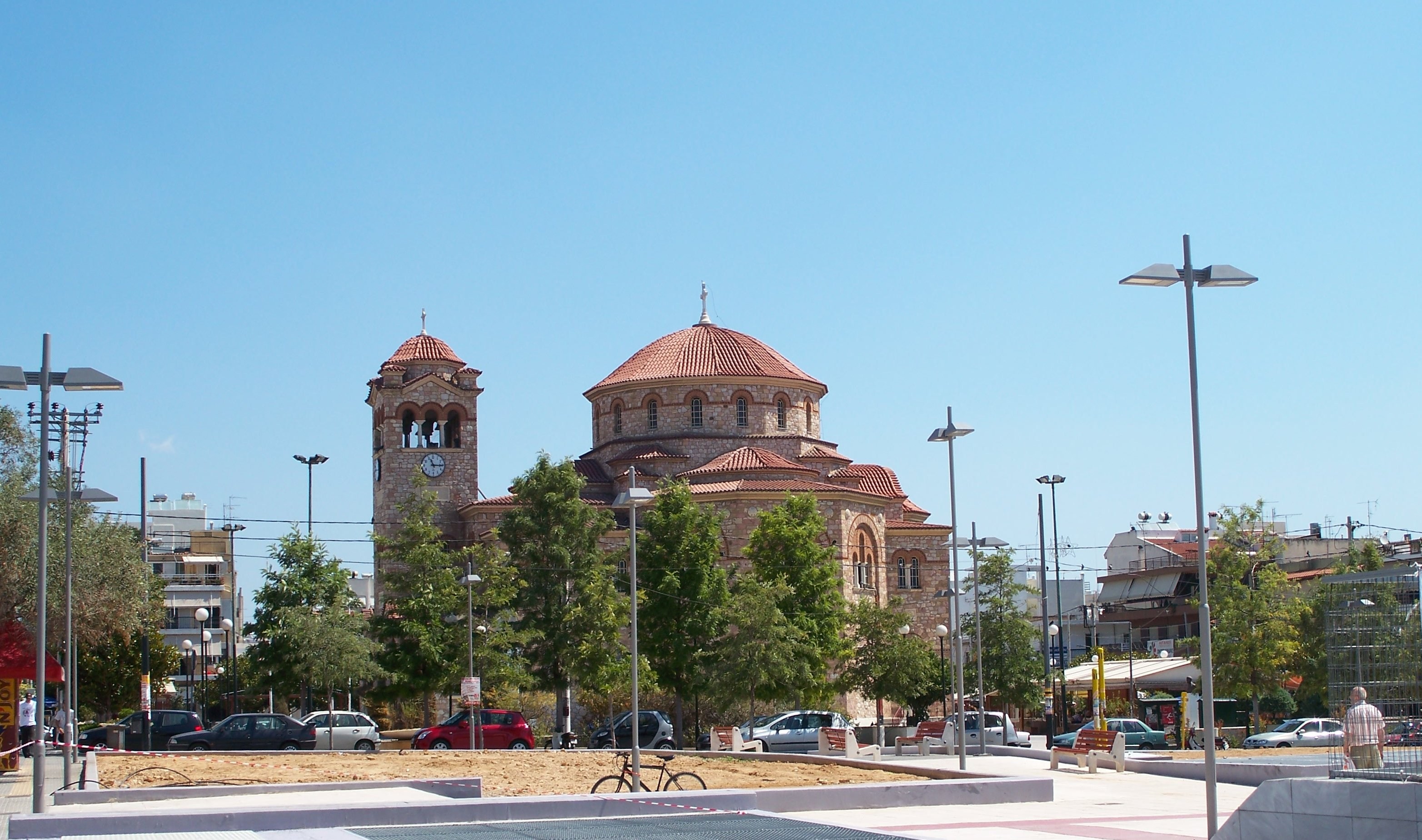
- Estavromenou (Christ on the Cross) Square

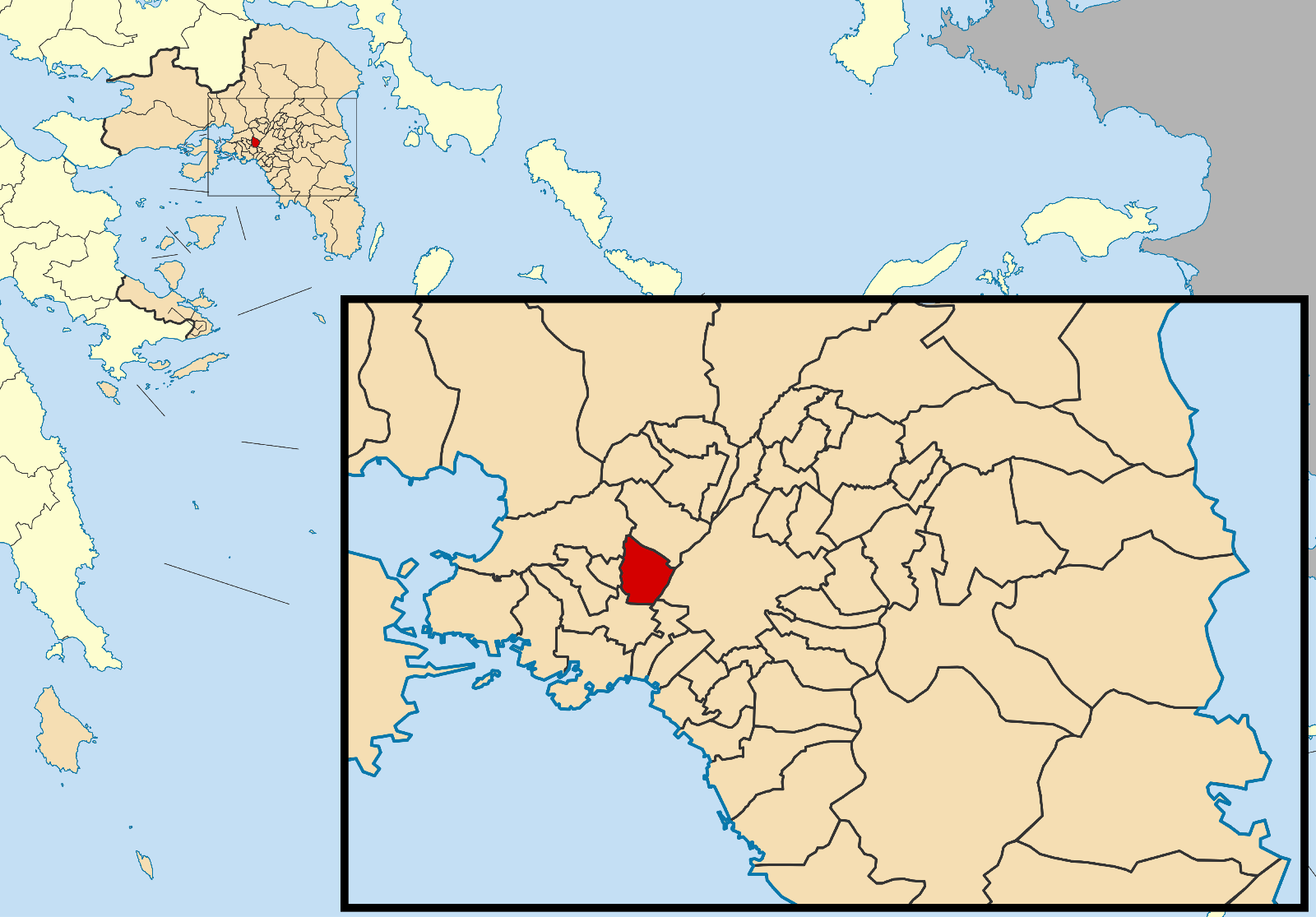

- Location within Greece
- Coordinates: 37°59′31″N 23°40′41″E
- Country: Greece
- Administrative region: Attica
- Regional unit: West Athens

Government
  - Mayor: Lampros Sklavounos (since 2023)

Area
  - Municipality: 6.450 km^{2} (2.490 sq mi)
- Elevation: 50 m (160 ft)

Population (2021)
  - Municipality: 65,831
  - Density: 10,210/km^{2} (26,430/sq mi)
- Time zone: UTC+2 (EET)
  - Summer (DST): UTC+3 (EEST)
- Postal code: 122 xx
- Area code: 210
- Vehicle registration: Z
- Website: www.aigaleo.gr

Aigaleo or Egaleo (Greek: Αιγάλεω, romanized: Aigáleo pronounced [eˈɣaleo]) is a town and a suburban municipality in the western part of the Athens urban area, belonging to the West Athens regional administrative unit. It takes its name from Mount Aigaleo, whose name comes from the words αίγα/aiga/goat and λαός/laos/people. Its population was 65,831 at the 2021 census.

== Geography ==
Aigaleo is four km (2.5 mi) west of Athens city centre. The municipality has an area of 6.450 km^{2} (2.490 sq mi). It is southeast of Mount Aigaleo. The Cephissus river flows through the industrialized eastern part of the municipality; about 1/4 of its area is taken up by factory developments. The town is served by two Metro stations: Egaleo and Agia Marina metro stations. The A1 motorway (Athens–Thessaloniki–Evzonoi) passes through the town.

Aigaleo consists of the quarters Kato Aigaleo, Neo Aigaleo, Damarakia, Lioumi, Rosika, Agios Spyridonas and Agios Georgios.

== History ==
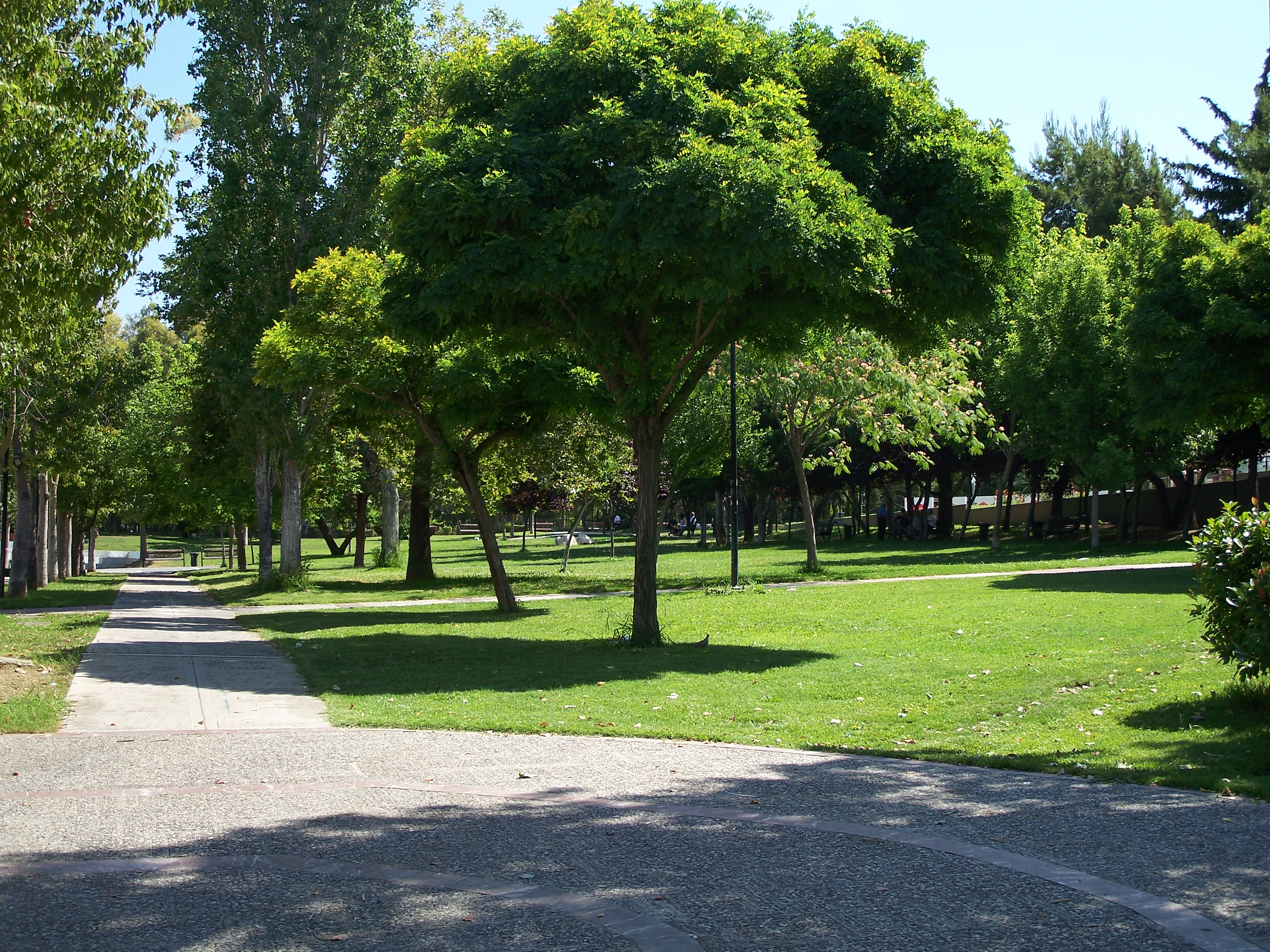
The municipal park of Egaleo, Attica

During the ancient times, Aigaleo was primarily used by the tribes of Athens for farming and raising animals. In particular, the town was well-known for its excellent goat meat. Cleisthenes, the Athenian statesman and lawgiver credited with creating the constitution that gave birth to the democratic regime of ancient Athens, was born in Aigaleo. According to Herodotus, it was from the top of Mount Aigaleo that, in 480 BC, Xerxes observed the Battle of Salamis and the destruction of the Persian fleet. Even after the Greek war of independence in 1821, life in the area remained largely rural and agrarian.

In 1874, the gunpowder factory "Ελληνικόν Πυριτιδοποιείον"/Ellinikon Pyritidopoieion was built, transforming Aigaleo into a heavily industrial area, covered by thick smog. In the dark tunnels where the construction sites operated, explosions often occurred and workers were buried alive. After each accident the blown-up galley was permanently sealed, without even declaring the dead. In 1908, after a merger, it was upgraded to a general ammunition production factory, and the company "ΠΥΡΚΑΛ"/PYRKAL was born. PYRKAL was the first modern Greek arm manufacturing company. With the ability to produce more than 60.000 bullets per day, including heavy weapon shells, it became the primary supplier of the Greek army.

After the fall of Smyrna in 1922 during the Greco-Turkish war, Aigaleo's population greatly increased due to the settlement of mostly Greek refugees from Asia Minor and Pontus, but also of Assyrians. A significant number of refugees hailed specifically from the town of Kydonies (Greek: Κυδωνίες), now known as Ayvalık. This led to a name dispute between the refugees and the locals, with the former calling the area Νέες Κυδωνίες (Nées Kydoníes, "New Kydonies") and the latter calling the area Μπαρουτάδικο (Baroutádiko, "powder mill"). Eventually the name dispute was settled, with an agreement to call the area by its ancient name.

Aigaleo was a part of the municipality of Athens until 1934, when it became a separate community. It was raised to municipality status in 1943. On September 29, 1944, during the Axis occupation of Greece, a massacre of at least 65 civilians (with estimates ranging up to 150 casualties) by the German forces took place in Aigaleo's Agios Georgios neighborhood.

During the 1950s, in collaboration with NATO, the Aigaleo's gunpowder factory began production once again. The later Greek army rearmament, however, consisted primarily of imported guns and bullets. As a result, the factory began producing less and less. During the 1970s the production was almost non-existent, consisting mainly of small amounts of hunting shells.

After the passage of new legislation prohibiting the existence of factories within the limits of urban areas, Aigaleo's factory was declared illegal. The factory was finally moved to Elefsina in 1974. The old factory's area was later sold to the Greek state and transformed into a forest, greatly improving the air quality in the area.

The city's present mayor is Lampros Sklavounos, since the 2023 Greek local elections.

== List of Mayors ==
- Athanasios Papadopoulos (1934–1939, first president of the community "Nees Kydonies")
- Giorgos Kourousis (1939–1944)
- Ioannis Batzakidis (1944–1945)
- Athanasios Papadopoulos (1945–1946)
- Sosipatros Moros (1946)
- Aggelos Kouvelos (1946–1950)
- Chr. Katharios (1950–1951)
- Apostolos Stigas (1951–1954)
- Stavros Mavrothalassitis (1955–1967, 1975–1978)
- Georgios Martinis (1959)
- Orfeas Tzanetopoulos (appointed by the military government, 1967–74)
- Leandros Rakindzis (1974–1975)
- Panos Spiliopoulos (1979–1986, 1991–1994)
- Ioannis Mistakopoulos (1987–1990, 1995–2002)
- Dimitris Kalogeropoulos (2003–2010)
- Christos Kardaras (1 September 2010 – 31 August 2014)
- Dimitris Birbas (1 September 2014 – 31 August 2019)
- Giannis Gikas (1 September 2019 – 31 August 2023)
- Lampros Sklavounos (1 September 2023 – present)

== Historical population ==
| Year | Population |
|---|---|
| 1940 | 17,686 (community) |
| 1951 | 29,464 |
| 1961 | 57,840 |
| 1971 | 79,961 |
| 1981 | 81,906 |
| 1991 | 78,563 |
| 2001 | 74,046 |
| 2011 | 69,946 |
| 2021 | 65,831 |

== Culture ==
Aigaleo was always known for its nightlife, with numerous night clubs and bouzoukia, playing mostly Greek folk types of music such as Laïko and Rebetiko. Some of the greatest music artists of all time have lived and performed in Aigaleo, such as Giorgos Zampetas, Stelios Kazantzidis, and Marinella. Today, although the large nightclubs of the past are mostly gone, the area is still known for its nightlife, mostly for its taverns, serving wine and raki.

At some point, the town was known to have more than twenty cinemas. Out of those, only a couple remain operative to this day. The town also have the open theatre "Alexis Minotis" inside the forest. The town also operates the cultural centre "Elliniko Molybi" (the Greek pencil), that promotes local young artists, also teaching literature and theatre writing.

== Sports ==
Aigaleo hosts many sport teams. The most successful is the Athletic Club Egaleo with successful departments in football (Egaleo F.C.) and basketball (Egaleo B.C.). Other amateur clubs are A.P.O. Orfeas Egaleo, A.E. Egaleo City, Diagoras Dryopideon, A.P.O. Ierapolis, A.O. Cronos

Notable sport clubs based in Egaleo
| Club | Sports | Founded | Achievements |
|---|---|---|---|
| A.P.O. Orfeas Egaleo | Football | 1928 | Earlier presence in B Ethniki |
| Egaleo | Football | 1946 | Long-time presence in A Ethniki. B Ethniki Champions (4 times). C Ethniki Champions (2 times). |
| Egaleo | Basketball | 1956 | Earlier presence in A1 Ethniki |
| Diagoras Dryopideon | Basketball | 1967 | Earlier presence in B Ethniki |

== Notable people ==
- Rita Abatzi, Greek musician
- Keti Garbi, Greek singer
- Giorgos Zampetas, Greek musician
- Eleni Rantou, Greek actor
- Giorgos Messalas, Greek actor
- Vicky Psarakis, Greek singer

== International relations ==
Aigaleo is twinned with:

- Leganés (Comunidad de Madrid), Spain
- Kythrea, Cyprus (under Turkish occupation, since August 1974)

== Sources ==
- "Τέχνης έργα και πρόσωπα του Αιγάλεω" (Published by the Municipality of Egaleo)
- "Εξήντα χρόνια τοπική αυτοδιοίκηση στο Αιγάλεω" (Nikolaos Mihiotis)
- "Απ' τις Νέες Κυδωνίες στο Δήμο Αιγάλεω" (Eugenia Bournova)
