= Makri =

Makri may refer to:

- Makri (island), a Greek island
- Makri, Evros, a village in Greece
- Fethiye, formerly known as Makri, a city in Turkey
- Makri, Bulandshahr, a village in Uttar Pradesh, India
- a surname:
  - Nancy Makri (born 1962), physicist
  - Kyveli Makri, artist

== See also ==
- Macri, a surname
- Nea Makri, a town in Greece
