= Mankri =

Mankri may refer to:

- Mankri, Rajasthan, a village in Neem-Ka-Thana tehsil, Rajasthan, India
- Makri, Bulandshahr, a village in Uttar Pradesh, India
- Man-kri, a title of Burmese monarchs

== See also ==
- Mankrai, union council in Pakistan
