= Macri =

Macri or Macrì is an Italian surname, which literally means "long, tall" (from Italiot Greek macrì, ultimately from Modern Greek makris). Notable people with the surname include:

- Antonio Macrì (ca. 1902 – 1975), Italian leader of the 'Ndrangheta
- Dumitru Macri (1931 – 2024), Romanian footballer
- Federica Macrì (born 1990), Italian artistic gymnast
- Franco Macri (1930 – 2019), Italian-Argentine businessman
- Giuseppina Macrì (born 1974), Italian judoka
- Jorge Macri (born 1965), Argentine politician
- Matt Macri (born 1982), American baseball player
- Mauricio Macri (born 1959), former President of Argentina
- Nicole Macri (born 1973), American political leader serving in the Washington State House of Representatives
- Teresa Macrì (born 1960), Italian art critic, curator and writer

== See also ==
- Macri (Titular see)
- Makri (disambiguation)
