= Kyveli Makri =

Kyveli Makri (Greek : Κυβέλη Μακρή) born in Athens, Greece is a ceramic artist. She creates contemporary hand-built ceramics using clay, wood, plexiglass and recycled metals reflecting her attention to form, concept and contemporary hybridity. Her minimalistic use of design and mixed media techniques break the barriers of the present time and filter her creations with a touch of nostalgia, playfulness and artistic dialogues.

== Works ==
Her early work includes block-like ceramic sculptures of houses which incorporate the use of wood and plexiglass. Later she experimented with large pieces such as ceramic sculptures of ships and factories featuring recycled metal pieces . Her later work influenced by the findings from the excavations of ancient Greek pottery is a thematic series interpreted in vessels with formative liquid lines. This series was specifically designed for the Acropolis Museum in Athens .

Her work is displayed in the Acropolis Museum, the Museum of Greek Folk Art, the Benaki Museum and the Centre for the Study of Modern Pottery in Athens, in private collections and various art galleries in Greece. Most recently, Kyveli's work, exhibited at the Centre for the Study of Modern Pottery / The Pottery Museum in Athens, is a figurative interpretation of abstract thinking and spontaneous scribbles. This time, wall-art pieces set on wood and plexiglass deliver her artistic message via a ceramic-sculptural and graphic-mixed medium.

== Gallery ==
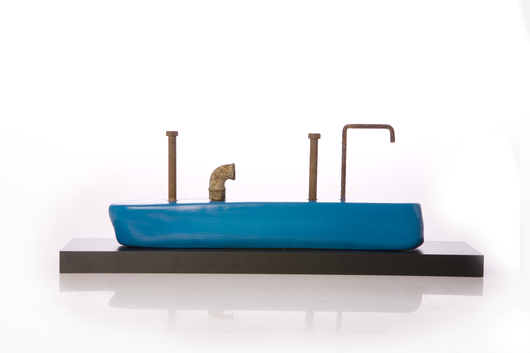
red clay and recycled metals on wood

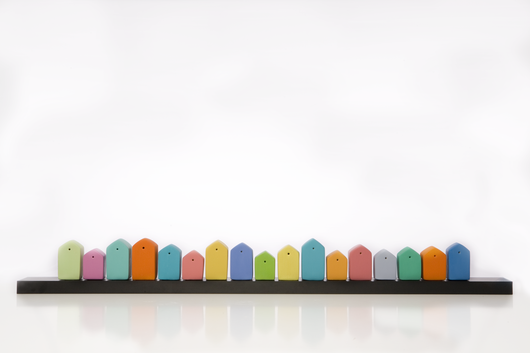
earthenware white clay on wood

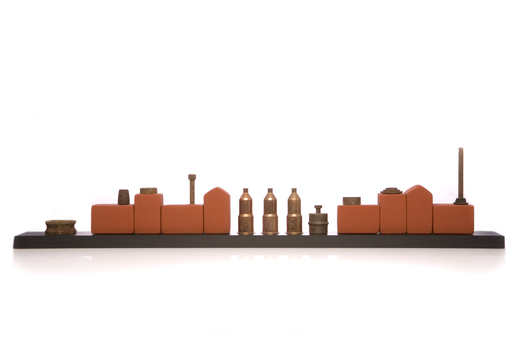
red clay and recycled metals on wood

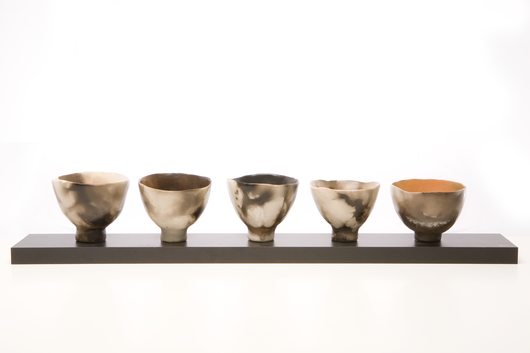
smoke-fired earthenware, sealed with wax, white clay on wood

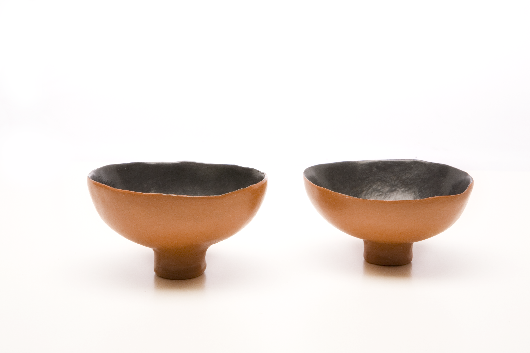
slip-burnished earthenware vessels, sealed with wax

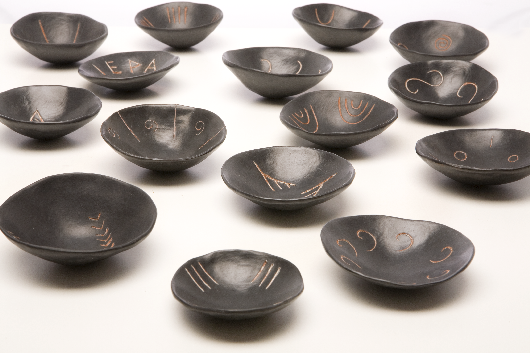
slip-burnished earthenware vessels, sealed with wax

Wall Art

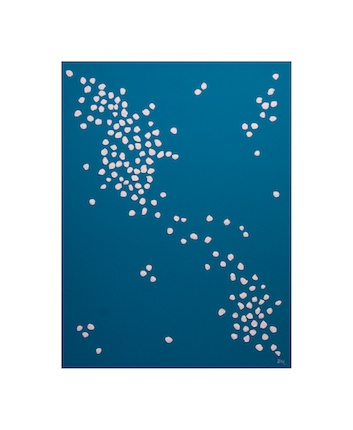
earthenware ceramic elements on wood, covered with Plexiglas

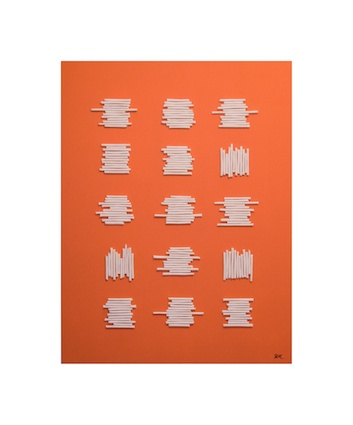
earthenware ceramic elements on wood, covered with Plexiglas

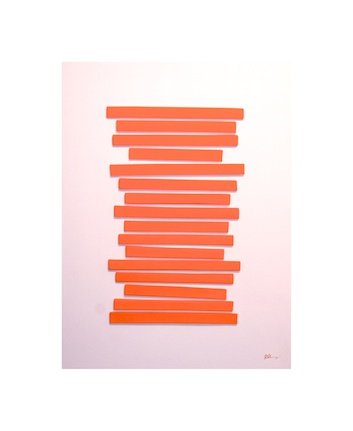
earthenware ceramic elements on wood, covered with Plexiglas

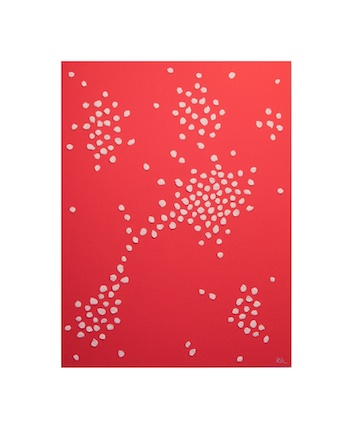
earthenware ceramic elements on wood, covered with Plexiglas

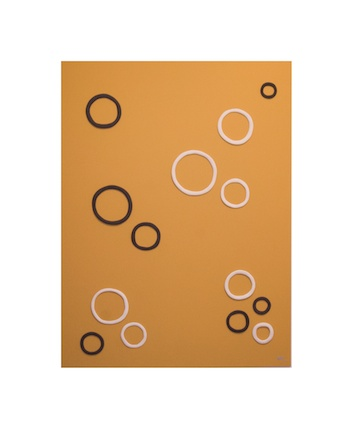
earthenware ceramic elements on wood, covered with Plexiglas

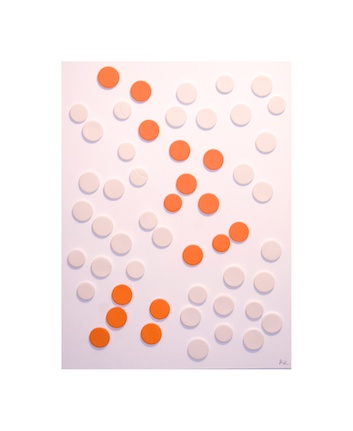
earthenware ceramic elements on wood, covered with Plexiglas

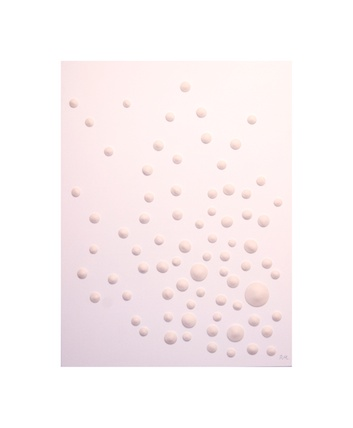
earthenware ceramic elements on wood, covered with Plexiglas

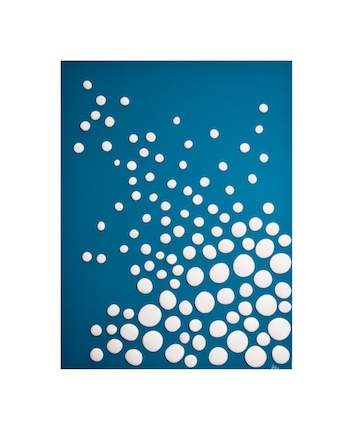
earthenware ceramic elements on wood, covered with Plexiglas
