= Centre for the Study of Traditional Pottery =

Coordinates: 37°58′42.1″N 23°43′13.3″E

- Κέντρο Μελέτης Νεώτερης Κεραμεικής
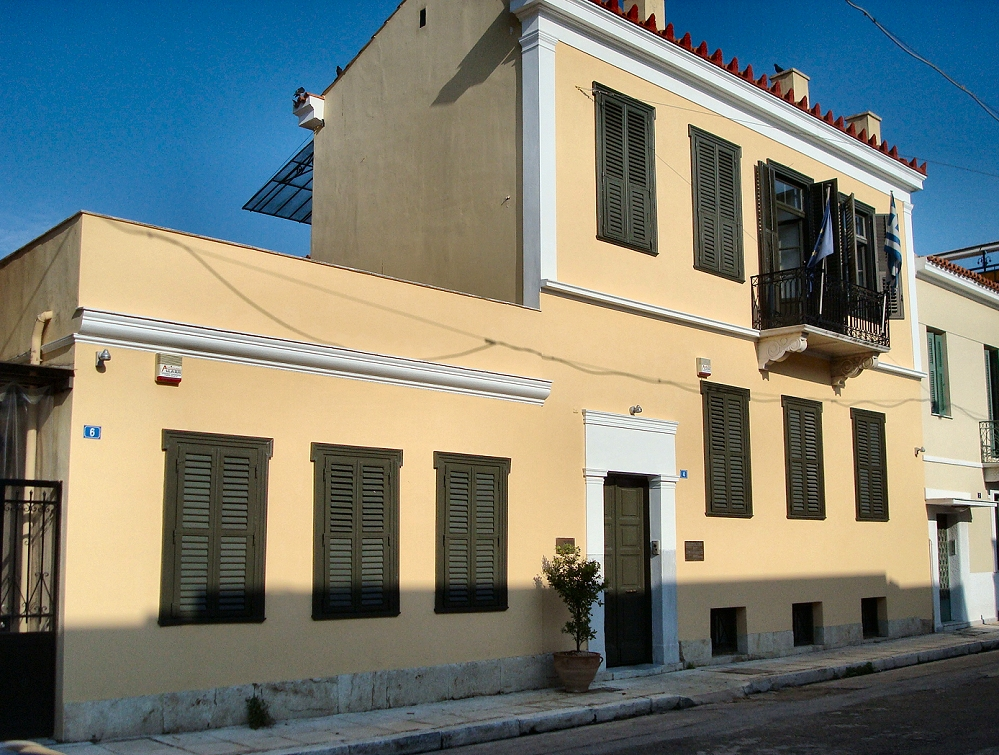
- Location: 4-6 Melidoni Str., Athens, Greece
- Type: Folk art museum
- Public transit access: Athens Metro : Thisseio Station

The Centre for the Study of Traditional Pottery, also known as Psaropoulos Museum of Traditional Pottery and as Study Centre for Contemporary Ceramics, is a museum and school in Athens, Greece.

== History ==
It is housed in a villa built 1875 during the Ottoman times. The 19th-century house is located on Melidoni Street in the Kerameikos neighbourhood of Athens.

The study centre was established in 1987 to research, preserve and promote the production of traditional Greek ceramics. Since 1999 it has been located in a neo-classical building at 8 Hepitou Street in Plaka and was officially inaugurated on May 18, 2000, International Museum Day.

The museums' collection, consists of some 4500 vases and tools from all over the country. Collections included Etruscan collared jars.

Since 2008, the museum has been managed by archaeologist Nikos Liaros; Yolanda Psaropoulos took over the museum's presidency from her mother Betty Psaropoulos.
