= Petralona metro station =

Athens Metro station

Πετράλωνα Petralona
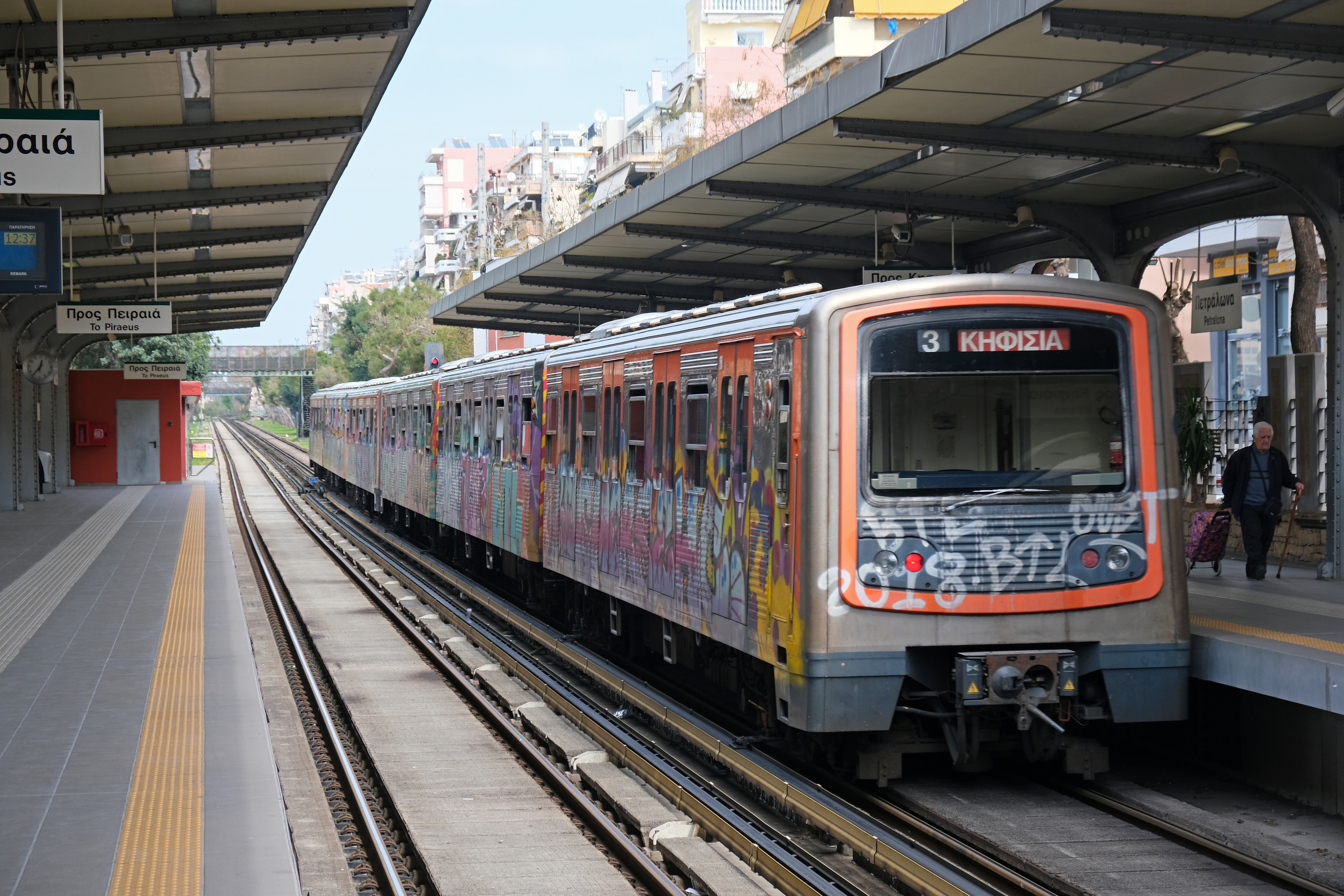
- Petralona station platform

General information
- Location: Athens; Greece
- Coordinates: 37.968455°N 23.709115°E
- Manager: STASY
- Line: Athens Metro Line 1
- Platforms: 2
- Tracks: 2

Construction
- Structure type: At-grade
- Accessible: Yes

Key dates
- 27 February 1869: Line opened
- 22 November 1954: Station opened
- 2 June 2003: Station rebuilt

Services
Preceding station	Athens Metro	Following station
Tavros towards Piraeus	Line 1	Thiseio towards Kifissia
Location

Petralona (Greek: Πετράλωνα) is a metro station on Athens Metro Line 1, located in Petralona and 7.016 km along the line from Piraeus. It is located in Central Athens and took its name from the neighbourhood in the Athens municipality.

Petralona was first opened on 22 November 1954 by the Hellenic Electric Railways, which operated the line at the time: the station was renovated in 2004, and has two side platforms.

== Station Layout ==
L1
Footbridge
Overpass between platforms
G
- Customer service
- Tickets
- Entry/Exit
Side platform
Southbound
← towards Piraeus (Tavros)
Northbound
towards Kifissia (Thiseio) →
Side platform
