= Thiseio =

Thiseio Θησείο
- Neighborhood
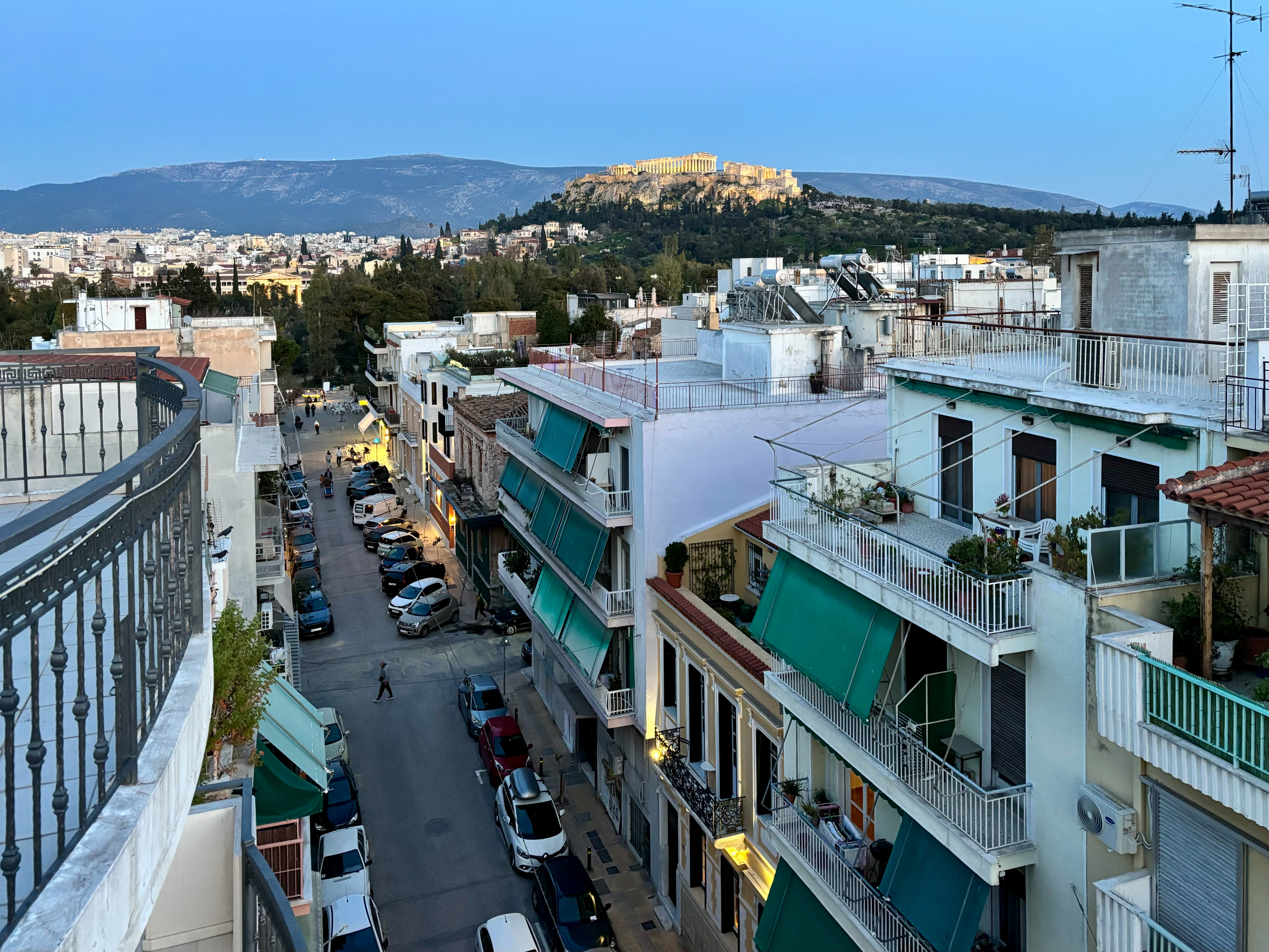

- Location within Athens municipality
- Coordinates: 37°58′32″N 23°43′00″E
- Country: Greece
- Region: Attica
- City: Athens
- Postal code: 118 51
- Area code: 210
- Website: www.cityofathens.gr

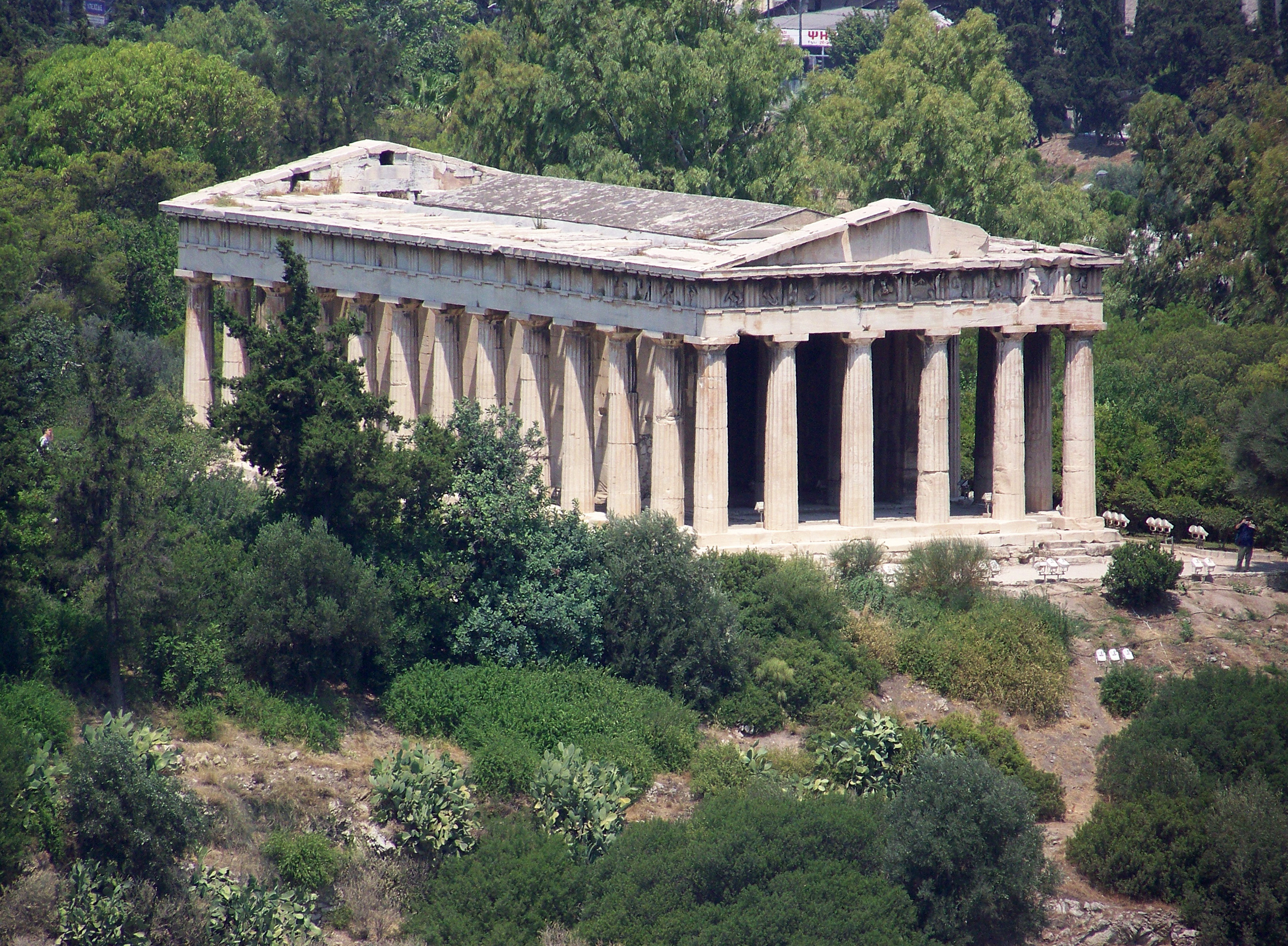
The "Temple of Theseus" (Temple of Hephaestus), after which the area was named

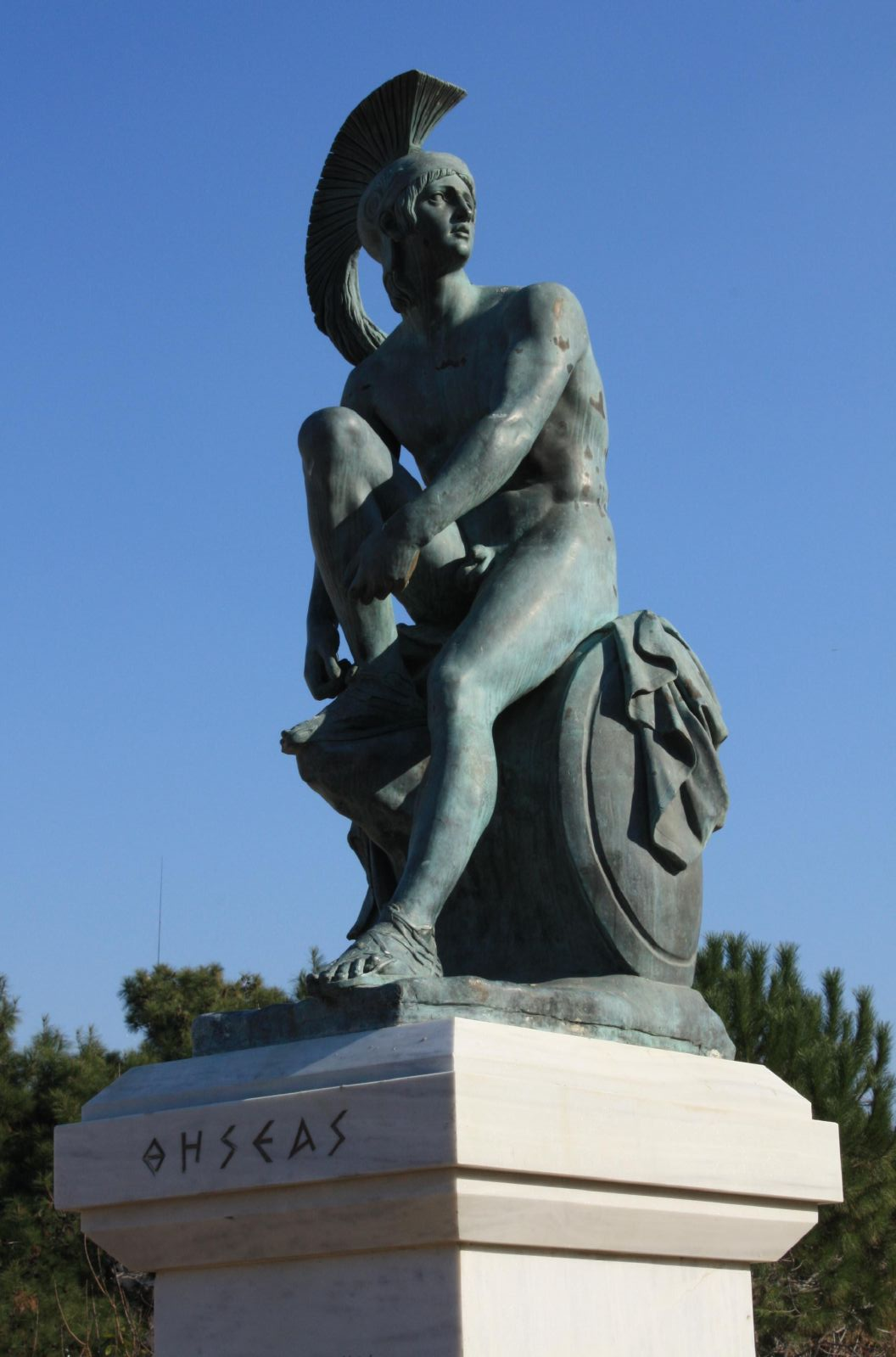
Statue of Theseus outside the Thiseio metro station

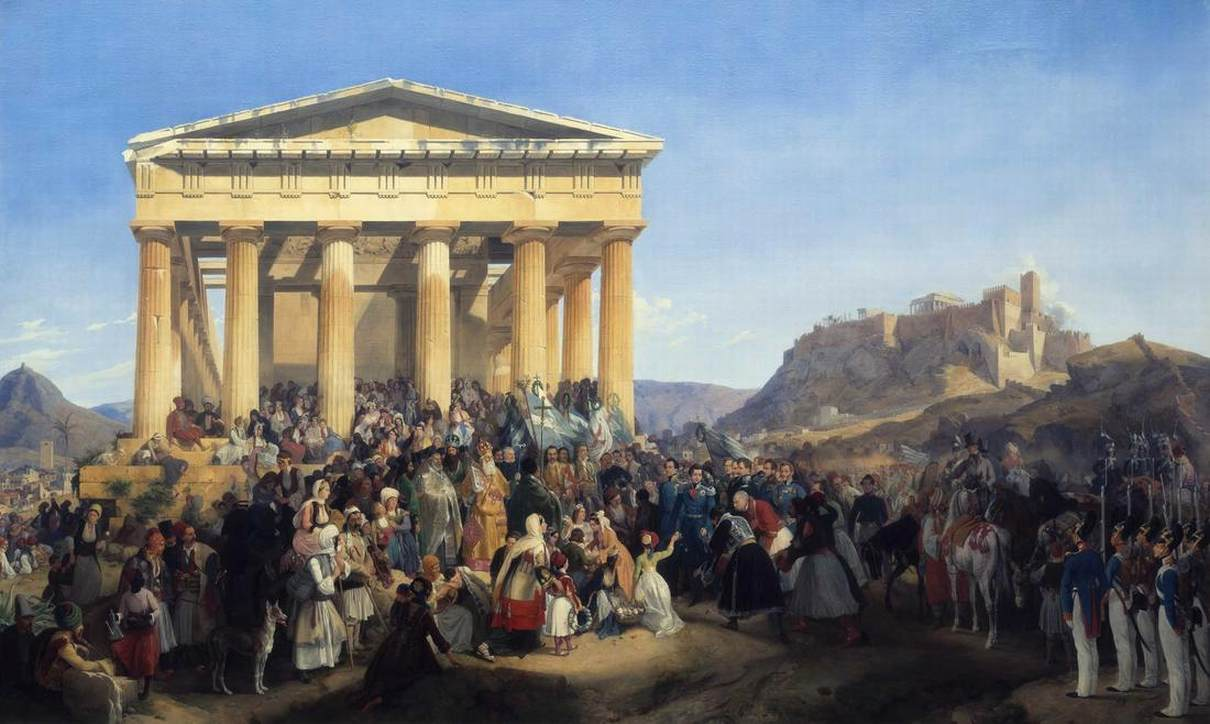
The Entry of King Otto of Greece into Athens by Peter von Hess, 1839

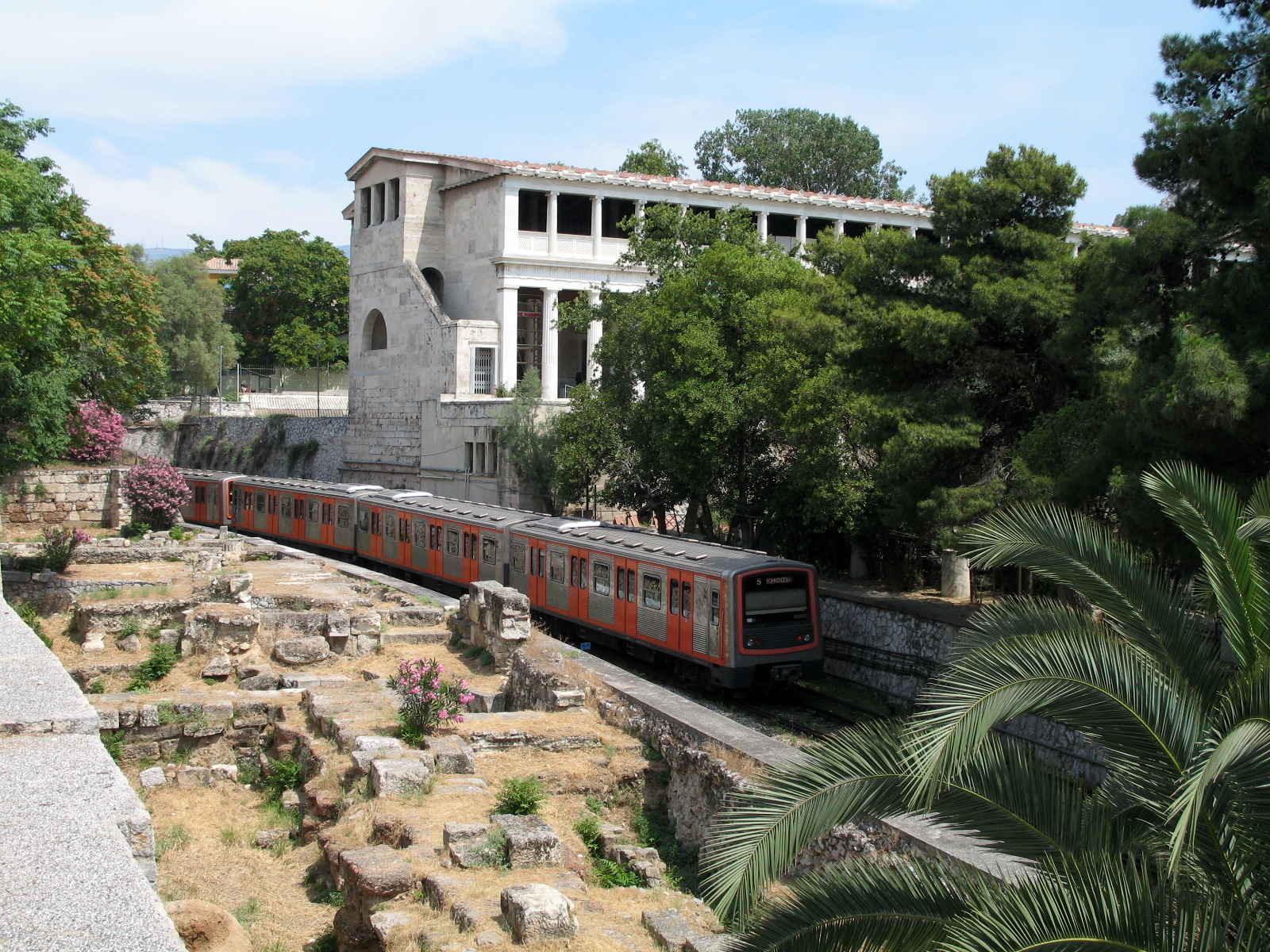
A metro line between the Stoa of Attalos and a basilica's ruins

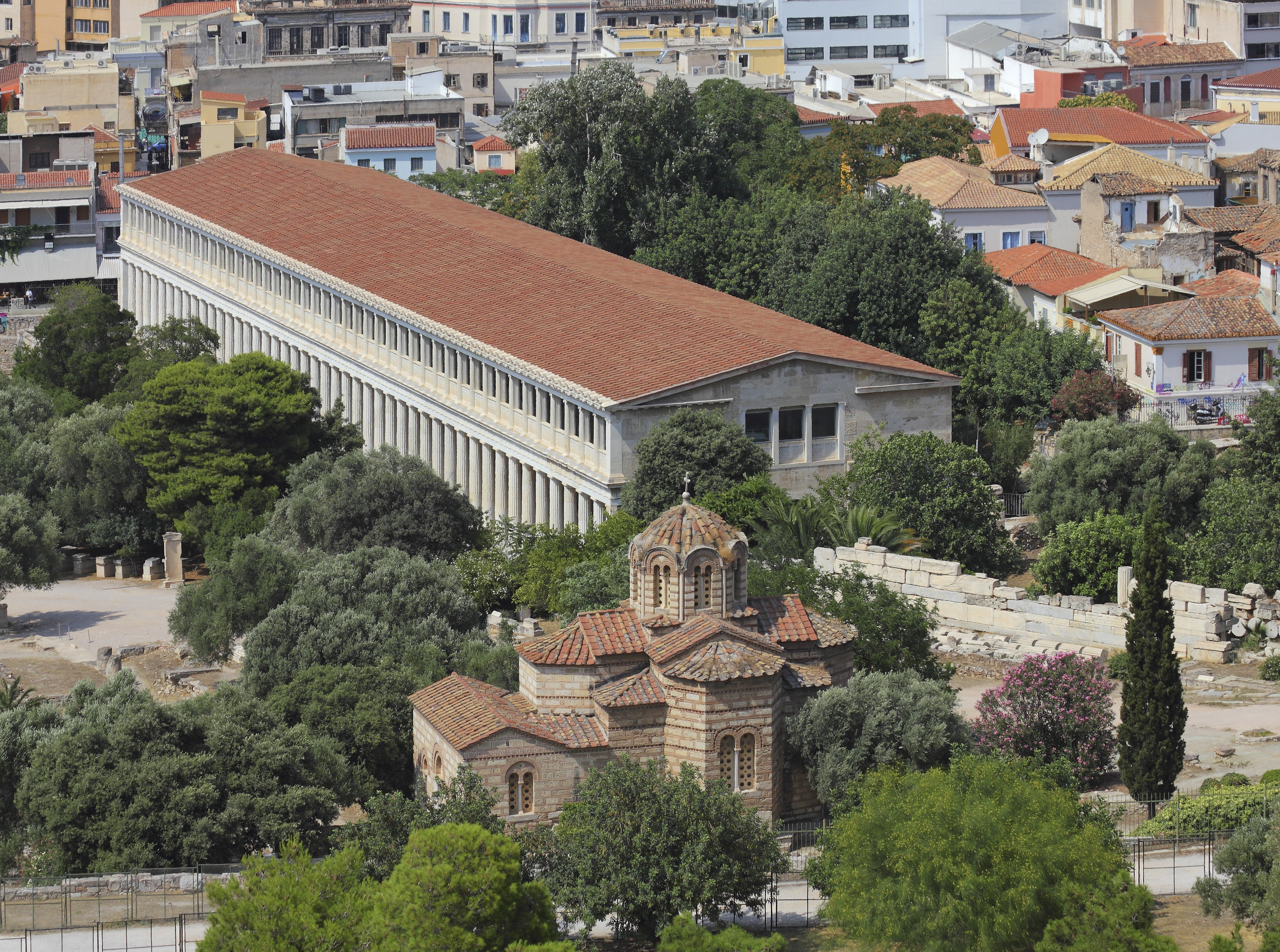
The Byzantine Church of the Holy Apostles next to the Stoa of Attalos

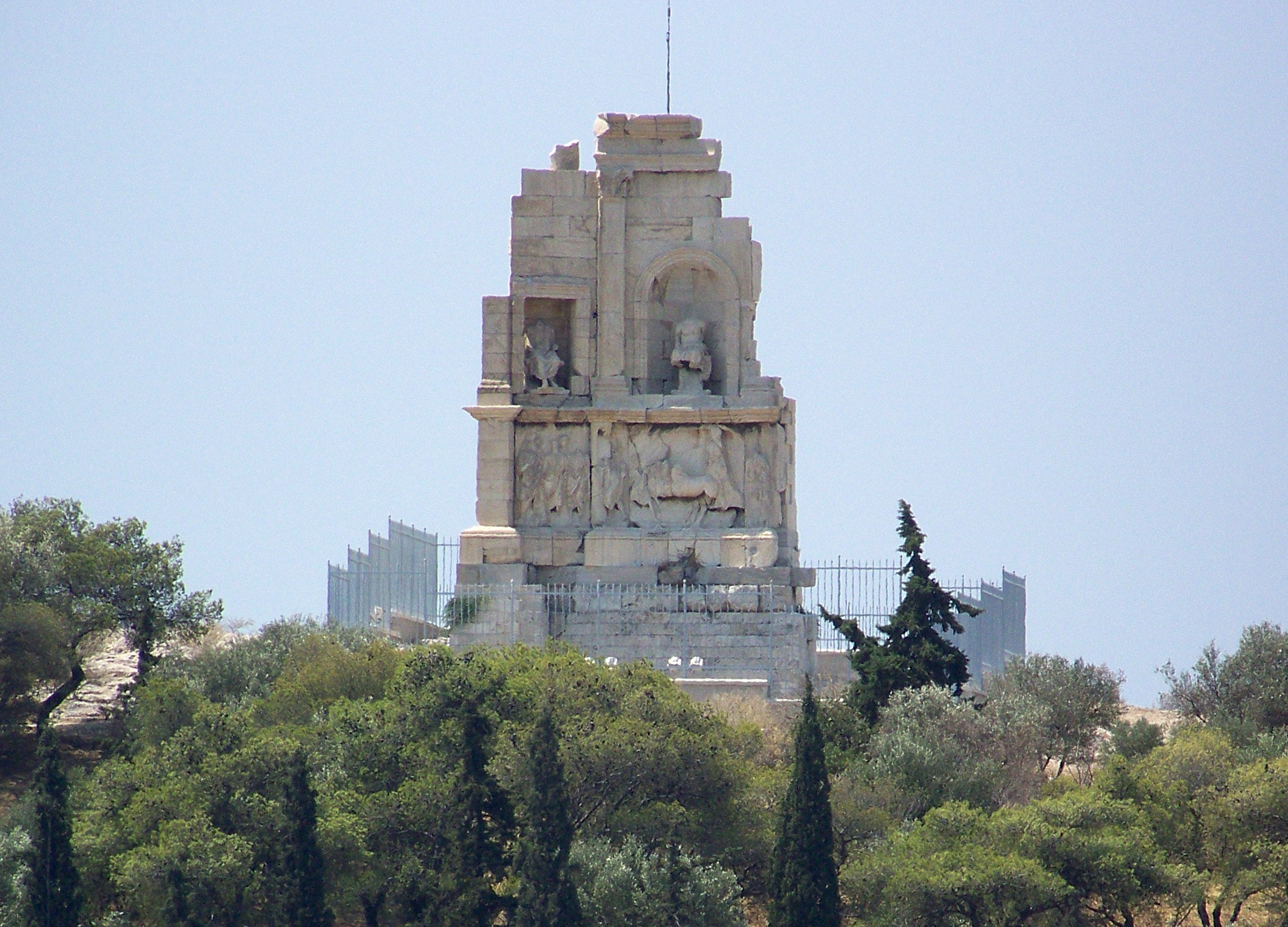
The Roman-era Philopappos Monument

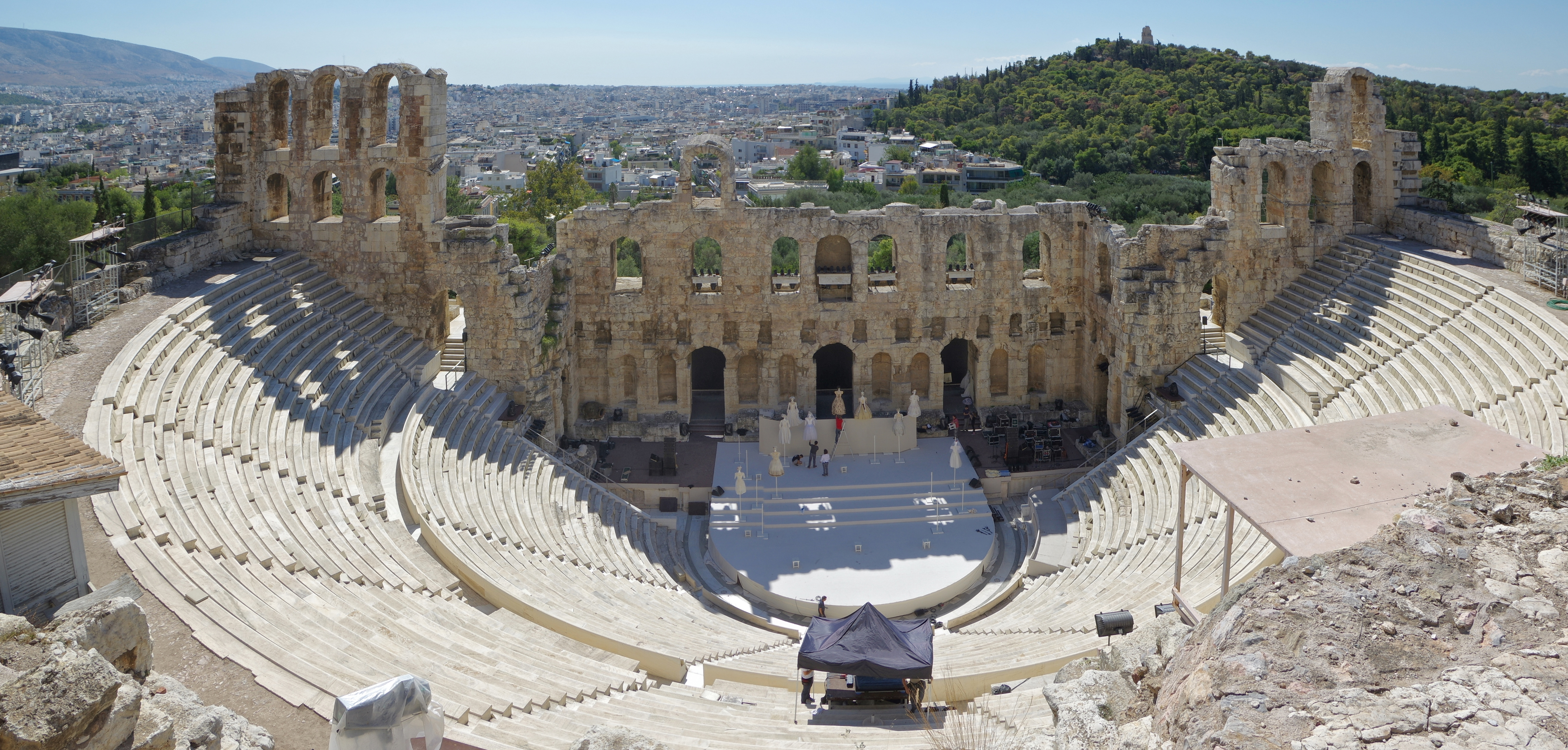
The Odeon of Herodes Atticus, open-air ancient theatre

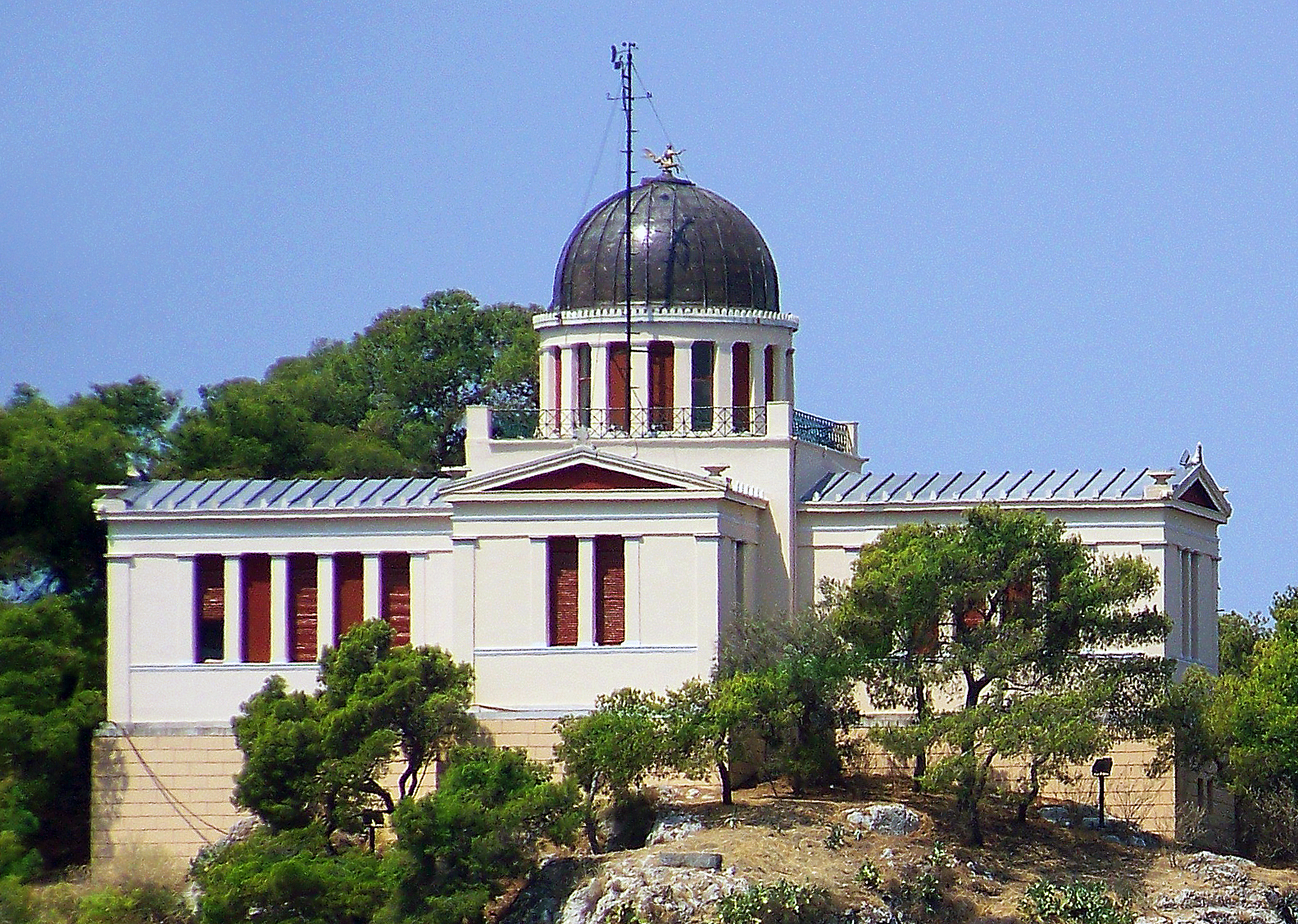
The National Observatory atop the Hill of Nymphon

Thiseio or Thissio (Greek: Θησείο, pronounced [θiˈsio]) is a traditional neighbourhood in the old city of Athens, Greece, northwest of the Acropolis, and surrounded by the archaeological sites of the Agora, Keramikos and Pnyx. The name refers to the Temple of Hephaestus, which was mistakenly known as Thiseion, in reference to Theseus, the mythical king of Athens.

The area is famous for its many pedestrian streets, Acropolis views, archaeological sites, churches, synagogues, cafés, open terraces, and cultural meeting points. Thiseio is served by the nearby Thiseio metro station and is connected to the other neighbourhoods of the old city of Athens through a network of pedestrian streets passing across the major archaeological sites.

== Residential streets ==
Here is a list of residential streets in the Thiseio area:

- Acamantos Street
- Aethras Street
- Agias Marinas Street
- Aethalidon Street
- Aixoneon Street
- Aktaiou Street
- Amphictyonos Street
- Apostolou Pavlou Street
- Avanton Street
- Chloridos Street
- Demophontos Street
- Dimitriou Aeginitou Street
- Efestion Street
- Eptachalkou Street
- Erysichthonos Street
- Galateias Street
- Hegiou Street
- Iouliou Smith Street
- Irakleidon Street
- Karydi Street
- Kimaion Street
- Lycomidon Street
- Myrmidonon Street
- Nileos Street
- Otryneon Street
- Phaedras Street
- Phlamarion Street
- Pnykos Street
- Poulopoulou Street
- Pygmalionos Street
- Thoricon Street
- Vassilis Street

== Archaeological center ==
Thiseio is surrounded by hills, heights, and historical sites which are within a walking distance. The Ancient Agora of Athens, the Stoa of Attalos, the Temple of Hephaestus, and Kerameikos Archaeological Museum can be entered from Thiseio; all others: the National Observatory of Athens, Acropolis of Athens, Philopappos Monument, Mouseion Hill, Pnyx, which is considered the birthplace of Democracy, and Mount Lycabettus can be easily reached or viewed from Thiseio. The panoramic views of them and their natural surroundings from the Areopagus height are spectacular, especially by night.

== Historical landmarks ==
The churches of Agia Marina, the church of Agii Assomati, the church of Agios Athanasios Kourkouris and others are situated in Thiseio. Also, situated in Thiseio are the two synagogues of Athens, Etz Chaim or Romaniote Synagogue and the Sepharadi Beth Shalom, the Holocaust Memorial of Athens as well as the Synagogue in the Agora of Athens inside the archaeological site. Restored neoclassical houses, narrow streets, architectural landmarks and archaeological sites make Thiseio a neighbourhood of Athens with a viewpoints towards the Acropolis. Due to Thiseio's position, adjacently to other historical neighbourhoods and archaeological sites, pedestrian-only streets join them. Therefore, the Athenians go for a walk around Thiseio and enjoy cultural events and promenades along narrow serpentine-like paths which twist their way through historical sites.

Apostolou Pavlou is a pedestrianized street which meets Dionysiou Areopagitou Street to form the main pedestrian zone around the archaeological site of Agora from Thiseio to the Acropolis. There are numerous small and friendly boutique shops, restaurants, and cafés where people are welcomed and invited to socialize at leisure; all set in a quiet enclave and frequented by both tourists and locals alike.

As one of the many entertainment centers of the city of Athens, Thiseio is rich in history and culture. It has museums, galleries, the two synagogues of Athens, exhibition centers, and open-air theatres and cinemas.

Location of Thiseio in central Athens

== Notable people ==
- Vasilis Avlonitis (1904–1970), actor
- Charalabos (Babis) Drossos (1927–2015), Premier League football player

== The N.O.A Meteorological Station ==
The National Observatory of Athens operates the oldest meteorological station in Greece that is still operational, and one of the oldest in Southern Europe. The station is located at the Hill of the Nymphs near the center of Athens. The A class Meteorological station has been located at the same position since 11 September 1890, while it started its operation in 1858 at a different location in Thiseio.

Climate data for Downtown Athens (1991–2020), Extremes (1890–present)
Month	Jan	Feb	Mar	Apr	May	Jun	Jul	Aug	Sep	Oct	Nov	Dec	Year
Record high °C (°F)	22.8 (73.0)	25.3 (77.5)	28.2 (82.8)	32.2 (90.0)	37.6 (99.7)	44.8 (112.6)	42.8 (109.0)	43.9 (111.0)	38.7 (101.7)	36.5 (97.7)	30.5 (86.9)	23.1 (73.6)	44.8 (112.6)
Mean daily maximum °C (°F)	13.3 (55.9)	14.2 (57.6)	17.0 (62.6)	21.1 (70.0)	26.5 (79.7)	31.6 (88.9)	34.3 (93.7)	34.3 (93.7)	29.6 (85.3)	24.4 (75.9)	18.9 (66.0)	14.4 (57.9)	23.3 (73.9)
Daily mean °C (°F)	10.2 (50.4)	10.8 (51.4)	13.1 (55.6)	16.7 (62.1)	21.8 (71.2)	26.6 (79.9)	29.3 (84.7)	29.4 (84.9)	25.0 (77.0)	20.3 (68.5)	15.6 (60.1)	11.6 (52.9)	19.2 (66.6)
Mean daily minimum °C (°F)	7.1 (44.8)	7.3 (45.1)	9.2 (48.6)	12.3 (54.1)	17.0 (62.6)	21.6 (70.9)	24.2 (75.6)	24.4 (75.9)	20.4 (68.7)	16.2 (61.2)	12.2 (54.0)	8.7 (47.7)	15.0 (59.0)
Record low °C (°F)	−6.5 (20.3)	−5.7 (21.7)	−2.6 (27.3)	1.7 (35.1)	6.2 (43.2)	11.8 (53.2)	16 (61)	15.5 (59.9)	8.9 (48.0)	5.9 (42.6)	−1.1 (30.0)	−4.0 (24.8)	−6.5 (20.3)
Average rainfall mm (inches)	55.6 (2.19)	44.4 (1.75)	45.6 (1.80)	27.6 (1.09)	20.7 (0.81)	11.6 (0.46)	10.7 (0.42)	5.4 (0.21)	25.8 (1.02)	38.6 (1.52)	70.8 (2.79)	76.3 (3.00)	433.1 (17.06)
Average relative humidity (%)	72.0	70.0	66.0	60.0	56.0	50.0	42.0	47.0	57.0	66.0	72.0	73.0	60.9
Average ultraviolet index	2	3	5	7	9	10	10	9	6	4	2	2	6
Source 1: Cosmos, scientific magazine of the National Observatory of Athens
Source 2: Meteoclub
