= Mankrai =

- Town and union council
- Location within Khyber Pakhtunkhwa
- Coordinates: 34.002°N 72.967°E
- Country: Pakistan
- Region: Khyber Pakhtunkhwa
- District: Haripur District
- Tehsil: Haripur
- Time zone: UTC+5 (PST)
- Postal code: 22620
- Area code: 0995

Mankrai, or Mankarai, is a village and union council (an administrative subdivision) of Haripur District in the Khyber Pakhtunkhwa Province of Pakistan. The Union Council includes villages namely Mankrai, Mohra Mamdoo, Pharhala, Kahaka, Naiger, Makhan, Bajida, Dobandi, Mohra and Jaama. This is first Union Council nearest to Haripur City across Dor Pull. People are mostly involved in farming and employment in various public and private sector organizations in the country.
