= Thiseio metro station =

Athens Metro station

Θησείο Thissio
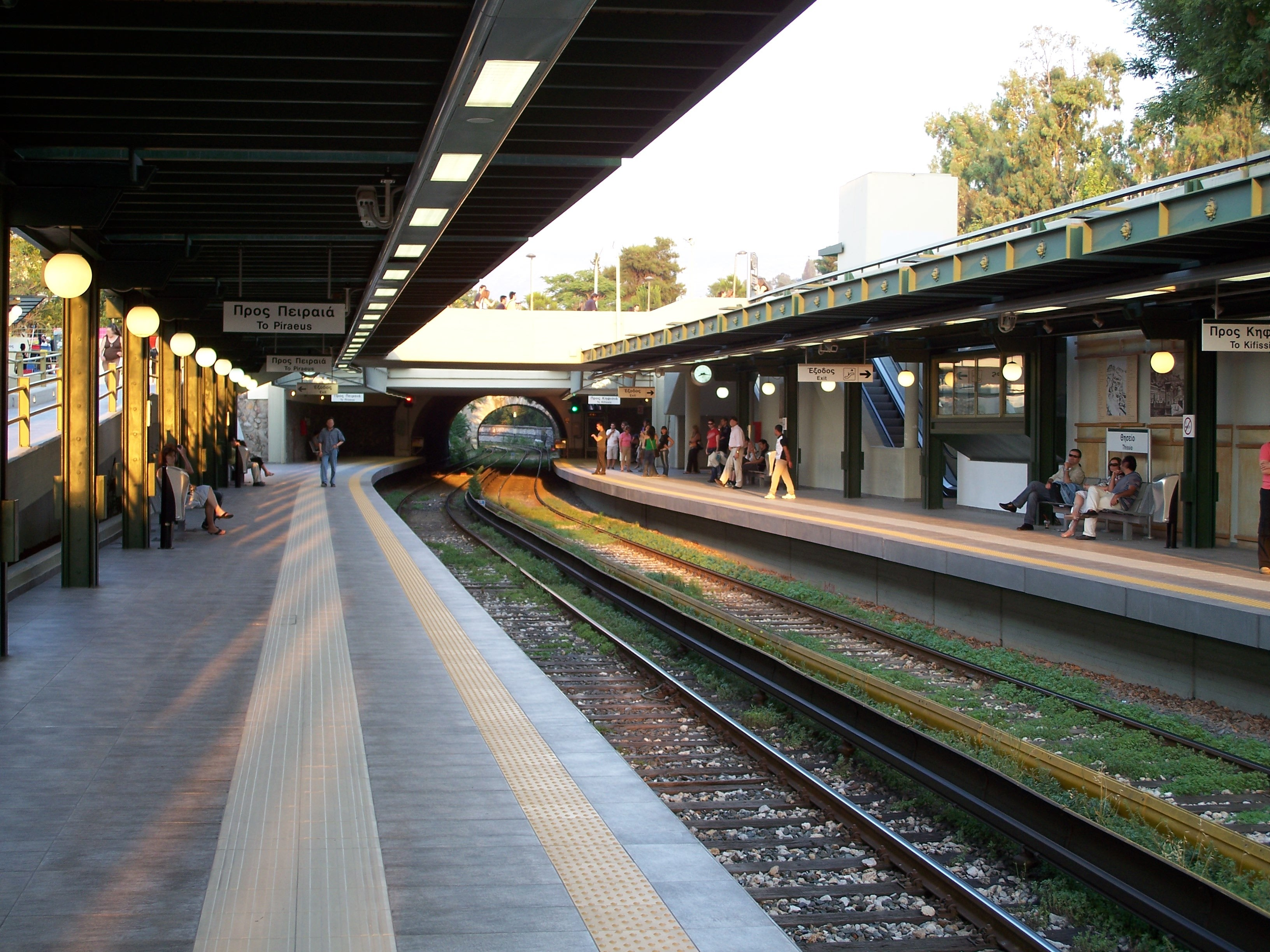
- Station platforms

General information
- Location: 118 51 Athens; Greece
- Coordinates: 37.976755°N 23.720130°E
- Manager: STASY
- Line: Athens Metro Line 1
- Platforms: 2
- Tracks: 2

Construction
- Structure type: At-grade
- Accessible: Yes

Key dates
- 27 February 1869: Opened
- 20 June 2004: Rebuilt

Services
Preceding station	Athens Metro	Following station
Petralona towards Piraeus	Line 1	Monastiraki towards Kifissia
Location

Thiseio (Greek: Θησείο), also known as Thissio on signage, is one of the oldest stations on Athens Metro Line 1, located in Thiseio 8.603 km (5.346 mi) from Piraeus. It is located in Athens and took its name from the nearby Temple of Hephaestus which is famous as Theseion. The station was first opened on 27 February 1869 and was renovated in 2004. It has two platforms. The 11th-century Holy Archangels Church is also located nearby.

Thiseio station is the first railway station in the city of Athens, other than the Thiseio–Piraeus of today's line 1 of Athens metro and the first railway line other than the range of the Greek government. The station was the furthermost on 17 May 1895, at the time the line ended to Omonoia. Today, its hours routed between Thiseio and Ano Patisia.

== Station Layout ==
G
Concourse
- Customer service
- Tickets
- Entry/Exit
B1
Side platform
Westbound
← towards Piraeus (Petralona)
Eastbound
towards Kifissia (Monastiraki) →
Side platform
