= Makri, Bulandshahr =

Makri Mānkri
- Village
- Location within Uttar Pradesh
- Coordinates: 28.5932642°N 78.112514°E
- Country: India
- State: Uttar Pradesh
- District: Bulandshahr

Population (2011)
  - Total: 5,052

Makri, also known as Mankri, is a village in Syana tehsil of the Bulandshahr district in the Indian state of Uttar Pradesh. It is located approximately 5 kilometres (3.1 mi) from Siana and 38 kilometres (24 mi) east of Bulandshahr.
