= Depots on the Berlin U-Bahn =

The Berlin U-Bahn has two profiles of depots, just like its trains: the wider Großprofil and the larger Kleinprofil. There is one Kleinprofil and three Großprofil depots. The depots are divided into Hauptwerkstätten (Hw, "main depots") and Betriebswerkstätten (Bw, "service depots"). Service depots only handle minor repairs and maintenance like changing the windows or removing graffiti. Main depots are used for the full inspections scheduled every few years. Lifting the trains off the tracks is only possible in the main depots.

== Depots ==
=== Grunewald main and service depot ===
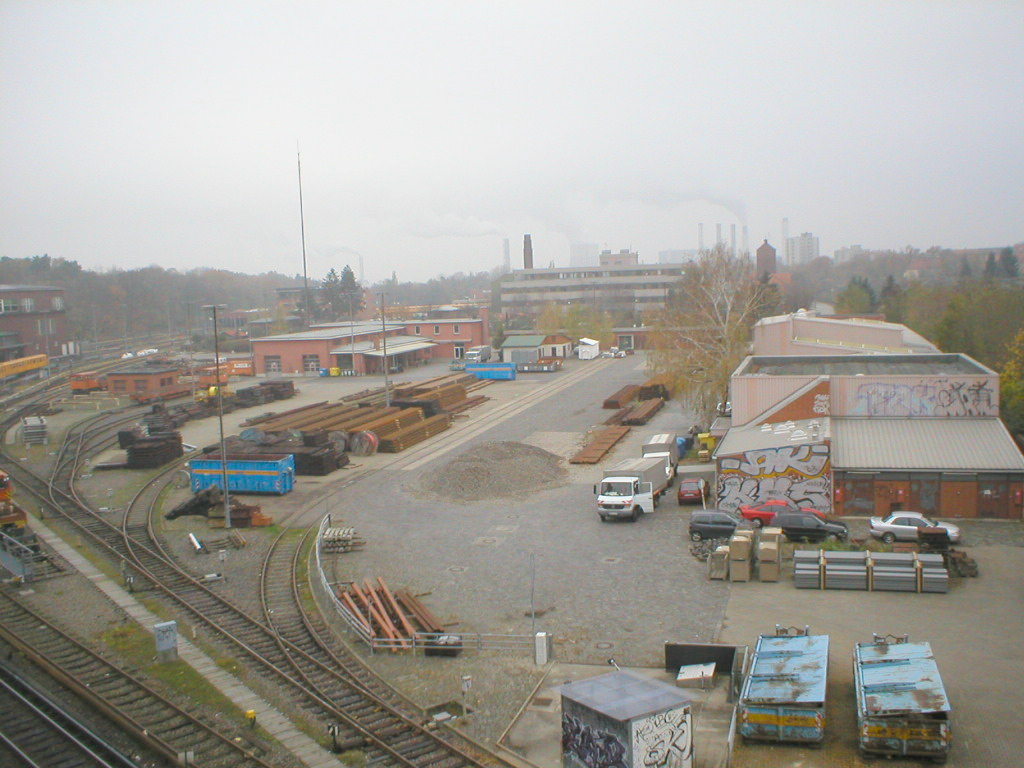
Part of the maintenance complex Grunewald

The Grunewald depot is the only Kleinprofil depot with the exception of the Hw Seestraße, a Großprofil depot also used for Kleinprofil trains. The depot, which opened on January 21, 1913, is directly adjacent to the overground U-Bahn station Olympia-Stadion. In 1913, the depot was constructed with one service building, in the following years three more buildings were added: Halle II (1924/25), Halle III (1926) and Halle IV (1927). In World War II, a large part of the complex burned down following an air raid on September 3, 1943. Reconstruction was finished in 1950, along with the rest of the U-Bahn network. In Berlin U-Bahn jargon the depot is called Bw Gru or Hw Gru.

=== Seestraße main and service depot ===
The Seestraße depot was opened in 1923, because the new Großprofil line C (now the U6) needed a workshop. It is located north of the Seestraße U-Bahn station. There are 17 tracks here, with two for the main depot and 15 for the service depot, one of which leads to the cleaning area. Because space is limited and the complex cannot be expanded due to its location in the inner city, it is planned to tear down parts of the workshop. Due to budget cuts by the BVG in 2003, Kleinprofil vehicles are serviced in Seestraße as well. The U-Bahn jargon shorthand for this installation is Bw See or Hw See.

=== Friedrichsfelde service depot ===
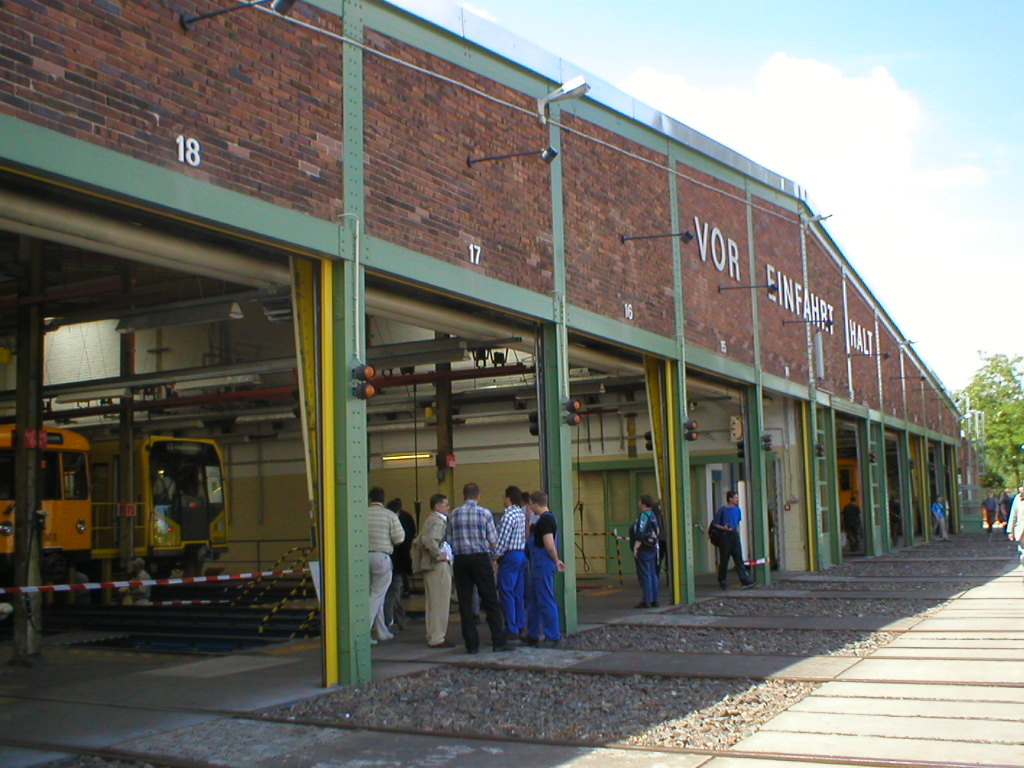
Wagenhalle II of the service depot Friedrichsfelde

Alongside the construction of the Berlin U-Bahn line E (now U5), the service depot Friedrichsfelde was built from 1927 to 1930. The depot is located in the vicinity of the Tierpark U-Bahn station. The buildings I and II, built in 1930, were among the most modern in the U-Bahn system at that time. It was used for East Berlin Kleinpofil trains, because the east had no Kleinprofil depot. In 1993, when the eastern and western networks were reconnected, this finally changed. The shorthand for the depot is Bw Fi.

=== Britz-Süd service depot ===
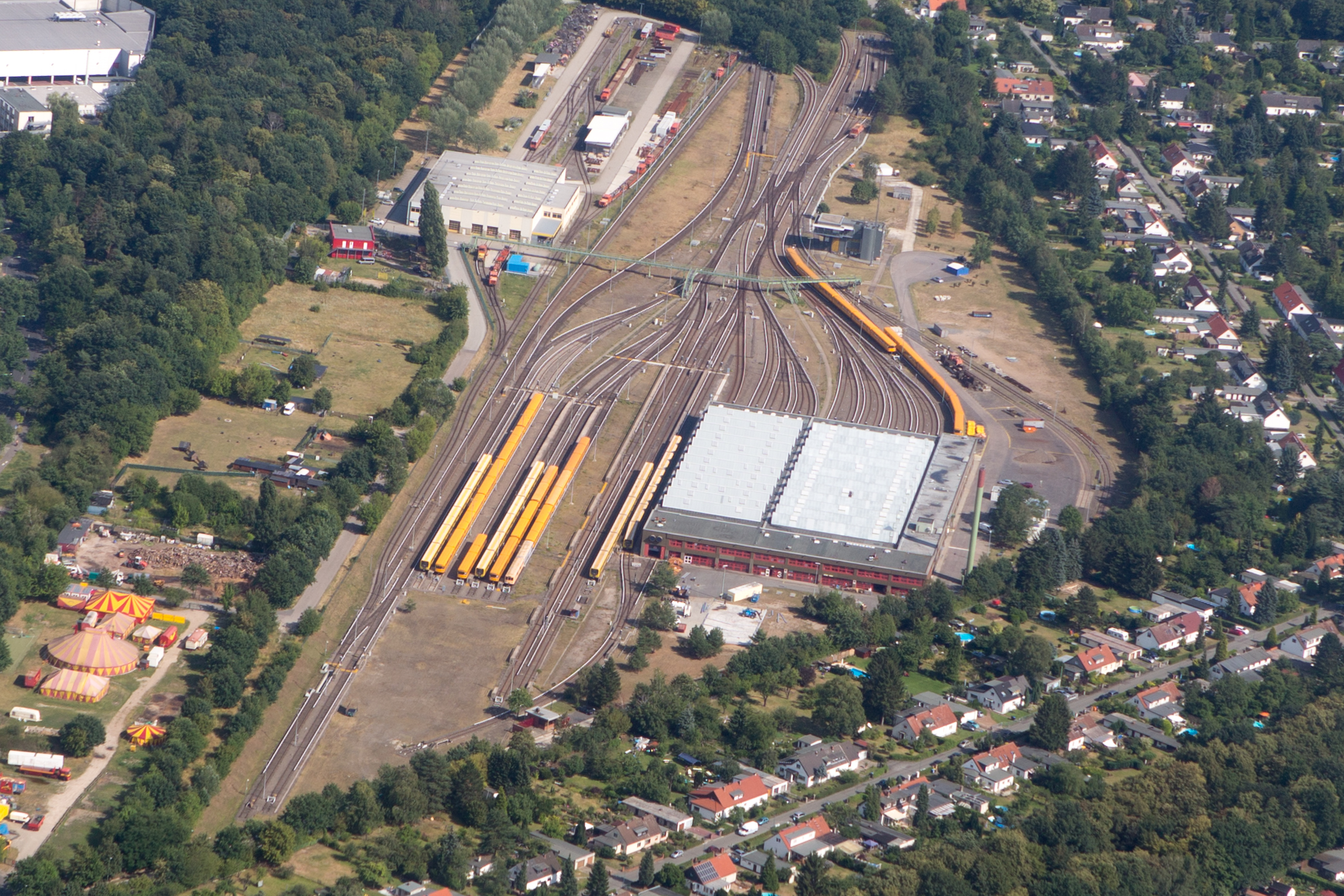
The service depot in Britz

Because there were more and more Großprofil lines built in West Berlin, it became necessary to think about new depots. Because the extension of the U7 to Rudow was being built at the time, building the depot there was the logical choice. Construction began in 1969 and was finished in 1971. Because the area bought was quite large with 100,000 m^{2}, further expansion was considered from the beginning. In 1988 an extension building for the service workshop was finished. It is the newest and most modern of Berlin's U-Bahn depot. The U-Bahn jargon shorthand for it is Bw Britz.
