= Berlin U-Bahn rolling stock =

Underground railway cars

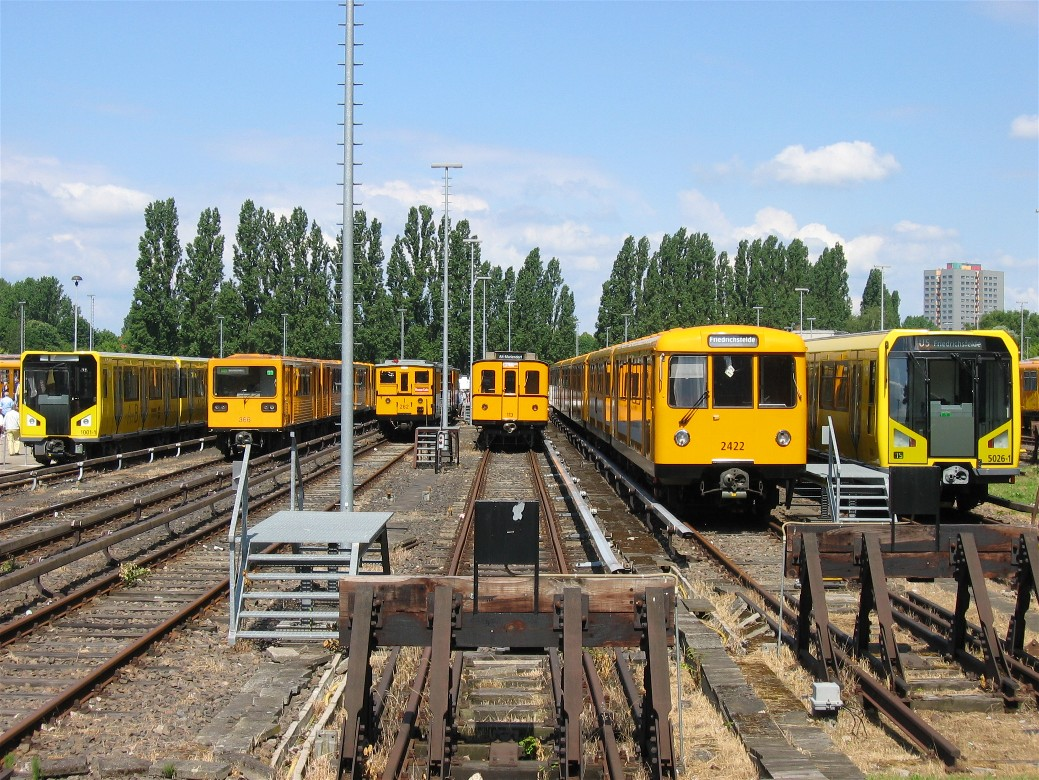
Variants of Berlin U-Bahn rolling stock at Friedrichsfelde service depot

The rolling stock on the Berlin U-Bahn are the main types of cars for the underground railway (subway). They are split into two general categories: Kleinprofil ("small profile", used by the U1, U2, U3 and U4) and Großprofil ("large profile", used by the U5, U6, U7, U8 and U9) lines. The names refer to the size of the train's coaches. Großprofil coaches have a width of 2.65 m (8 ft 8 3/8 in) and a height of 3.4 m (11 ft 1 7/8 in), and Kleinprofil coaches are only 2.3 m (7 ft 6 1/2 in) wide and 3.1 m (10 ft 2 in) high. Therefore, the trains have to operate on separate networks.

Both networks have 1,435 mm (4 ft 8 1/2 in) standard gauge track and are electrified at 750 volts DC. Because Großprofil and Kleinprofil trains use different types of power supply the trains cannot normally operate on the same route. However, on the Nord-Süd-Bahn in the years between 1923 and 1927 and on the E line (today's U5) between 1961 and 1978, Kleinprofil trains with specially adapted power pickups ran on Grossprofil tracks. They were fitted with special wooden boards on the sides to close the gap between platform and train. These wooden boards were jokingly called Blumenbretter ("flower boards"). In 2017, Kleinprofil trains with special power pickups began running again on the U5.

The polarity of the power rails also differs. On the Kleinprofil lines the power rail is positively charged and the track is negative, on the Großprofil lines it is the other way around. In East Berlin the polarity of the track section Thälmannplatz/Otto-Grotewohl-Straße - Pankow, was the same as on the Großprofil lines. After reunification, this exception to the normal Kleinprofil polarity was reversed by the BVG, even though there are benefits to this arrangement (there is less corrosion of metal parts in the tunnel with the Großprofil polarity).

The newest types of U-Bahn are H for the Großprofil and Ik for the Kleinprofil. The oldest vehicles still in service are of the F74 type (Großprofil) and the A3E type (Kleinprofil).

== Train profiles ==
=== Kleinprofil ===
Today, only trains of the Ik, Hk, GI/1E, A3E and A3L71-A3L92 types are in active service.

Kleinprofil train types
A-I	1901–1904
A-I	1906–1913	improved train steering
A-I	1924–1926	built from steel
A-II (Amanullah)	1928–1929
A3-60	1960/61
A3-64 (A3E)	1964
A3-66 (A3E)	1966
A3L66	1966	built from aluminum
A3L67	1967/68
A3L71	1972/73
A3L82	1982/83
A3L92	1993–1995
G (Gustav)	1974	prototype
G-I (Gisela)	1978–1983
G-II	1983
G-I/1	1986–1989
HK	2000–2007
IK	2015	On order from Stadler Rail

==== A type cars ====
Two test vehicles were ordered for the first Berlin U-Bahn line from the Cologne coach builders, van der Zypen & Charlier. One of these vehicles was used by Wilhelm II in 1908, leading to their nickname Kaiserwagen ("emperor's coach"). The train width of 2.3 m (7 ft 6 1/2 in) was already fixed at this point. At that time, trains and subways were still modelled on streetcars. The first production vehicles, which were appropriately titled A-I, were built in the Warschauer Brücke workshop. At the U-Bahn's opening in 1902, 42 multiple units and 21 pure railroad cars were ready for service. Unlike the test vehicles, the seating was placed along the walls of the train, which was considered more comfortable. This arrangement is still used today. These trains had a top speed of 50 km/h (31 mph).

Between 1906 and 1913, a fifth batch of vehicles was delivered; these had an improved steering system, making possible 8-car trains, which had become necessary due to rising traffic.

Originally there were smoking compartments and third class cars on the U-Bahn. Different classes were abandoned in 1927.

In 1926 the Schöneberg U-Bahn, which had been independent and had used their own vehicles up to that point, were taken over by the main U-Bahn network. Because a connection to the rest of the network had been planned from the beginning, the Schöneberg trains had been built to the same specifications as the main network.

From 1928 to 1929 a new type of Kleinprofil was introduced, the A-II cars. The most notable difference to the A-I type was that the A-II only had three windows and two sliding doors. Berliners called these trains Ammanullah-cars because the Afghan king Amanullah Khan had supposedly steered one of these trains during his 1928 Berlin visit.

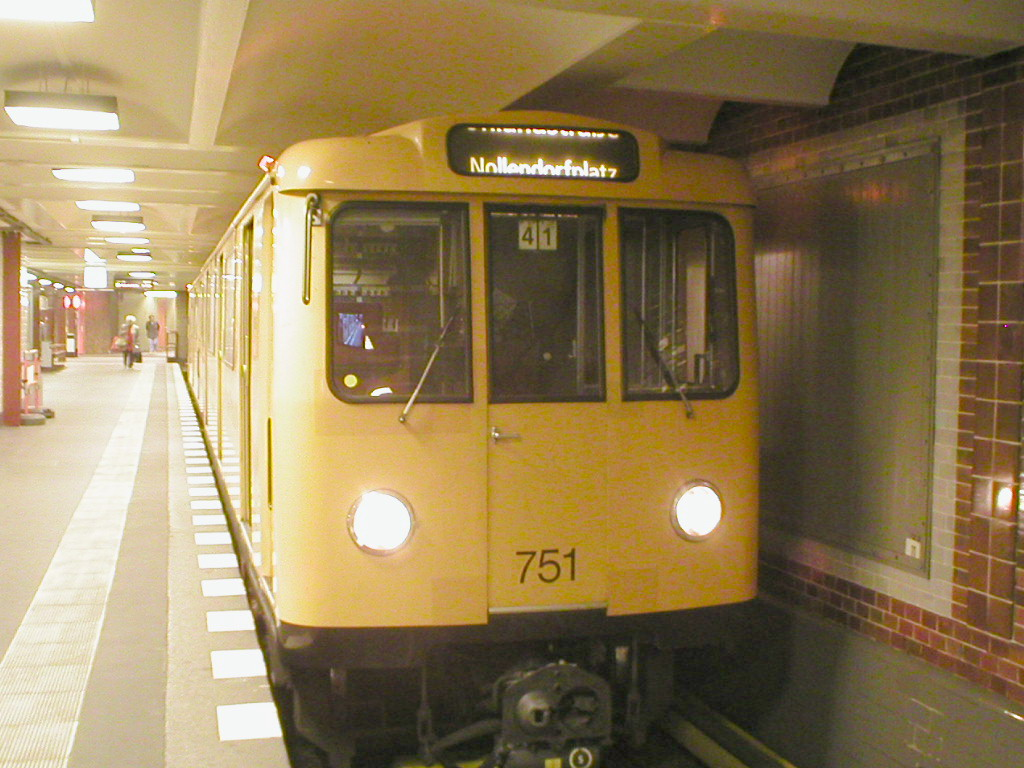
A A3L71 type U-Bahn

==== A3 type cars ====
After World War II a new batch of vehicles became necessary - the trains had been badly damaged in the war. At this point the new A3 type, modelled on its big Großprofil brother DL, was designed. There were three batches of this type in the years 1960/61, 1964 and 1966. However, because these were built from steel, the new trains required a large amount of electricity. A3 trains have begun refurbishment for A3-64 and A3-66 from 2003 to 2006, known as A3E, but 8 trains were scrapped in 2000. Based on the A3, the A3L type built from aluminum was developed.

==== G type cars ====
While in West Berlin newer and newer vehicles were built and used, in East Berlin the pre-war A-I and A-II trains were still running. Finally, in 1975 the Thälmannplatz — Pankow route got four prototypes of the new GI double multiple unit, called Gustav in popular parlance. As before, the seats were located alongside the train walls. The top speed was 70 km/h (43 mph). The smallest unit of these trains were half trains made up of two double multiple units. After intensive testing the LEW Hennigsdorf factory began manufacturing the trains. The production models had lower side windows and a changed front, but were technically the same. 114 cars were built until 1982. There were 24 more, but those were delivered to Greece for a railway line there. They were returned to Berlin in 1984/85. The GII trains were returned to Athens in 1997.

In 1988 a new batch of GI-trains was delivered, but with technical changes that made coupling them with the older cars impossible. Because of these changes the new trains were called GI/1. Their popular nickname was Gisela. A speciality of these cars was that they had only two doors per side, unlike the other Kleinprofil trains, which had three. All the older G stock were sold to Pyongyang (GI), the G cars went for scrap, and all the GI/1 trains were refurbished into GI/1E from 2005 to 2007 in order to extend the lifespan.

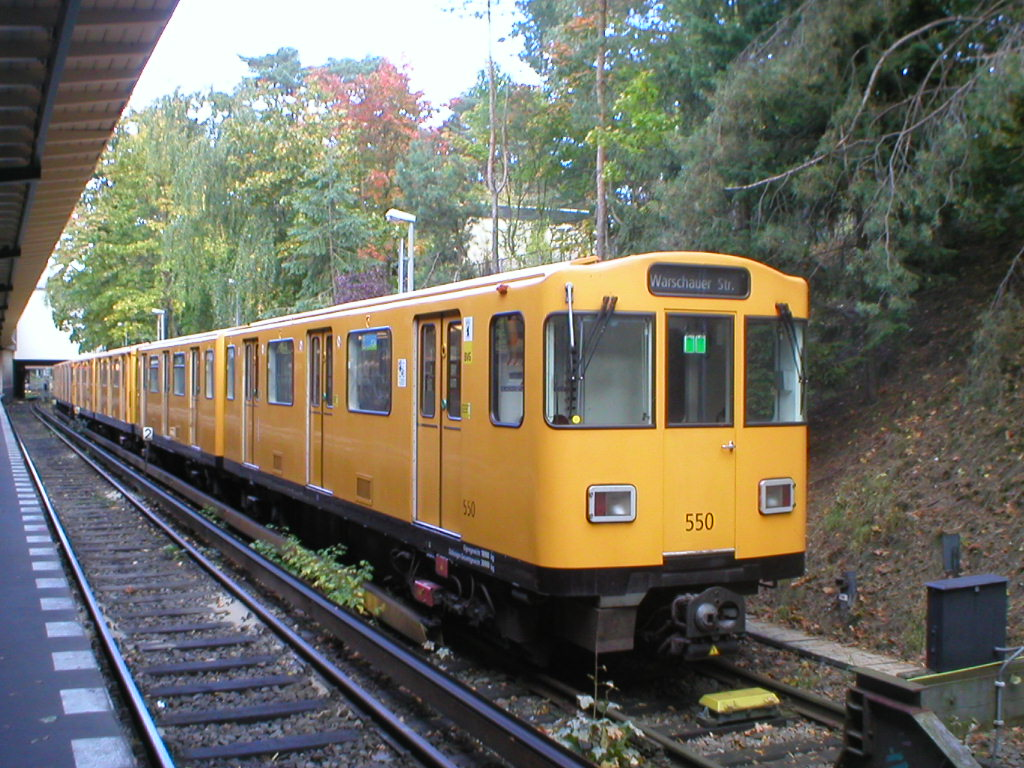
A A3L92 type train

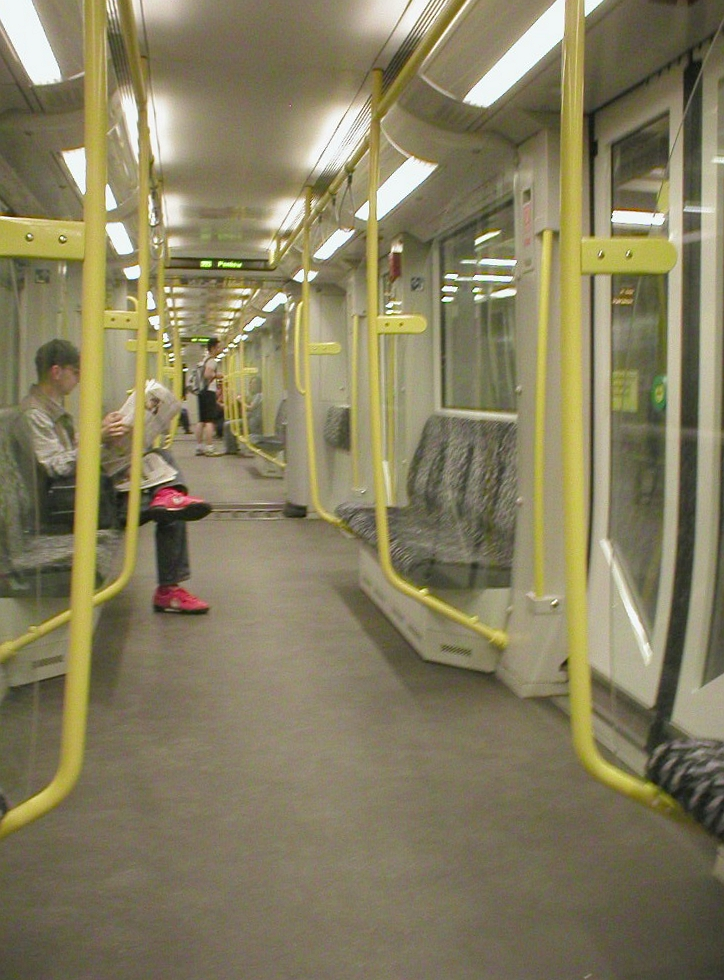
Interior of a HK type train

==== HK type cars ====
In allusion to the Großprofil series H two prototypes were built in 2000, which had the designation HK - originally, the plan had been to call them A4. Unlike their Großprofil model, cars on these trains are not fully inter-connected for passengers. A full train can be divided into two half trains. The production of the first train started in May 2005. On the U2 these new trains now represent a majority of trains run. They replaced all the A3L67 trains in 2007.

Majority of the trains run on the U2, while some of them ran on the U1 if there is an emergency situation like trackworks or pullover and hardly any ran on the U3 and U4.

==== IK type cars ====
In August 2011, BVG announced an order of IK series in order to replace A3L71 stock which will be life expired. Two prototypes have been bought from Stadler Rail and the remaining 38 units to be delivered between 2015 and 2017. These trains are based on the Stadler Tango family of trams and light rail vehicles, but will resemble and function like a full-fledged subway train. The number '1xxx' will be jumped into '18Yxxx' (where Y is the train car number). Thanks to regenerative braking the trains will recuperate up to 20% of the energy they require.

Two prototype 4-car sets were initially ordered. In 2015, a production order for 38 sets was placed which are scheduled to be delivered in 2017. These will replace the present A3L71 series.

=== Großprofil ===
Today, only trains of the F and H types are in active service.

Großprofil train types
A-IK (Blumenbretter)	1923–1927; 1945–1968	cars of the Kleinprofil type A-I
B I (Tunneleulen)	1924–1928	improved train steering
B II	1927–1929	a new batch of B-I cars
C I (Langwagen)	1926/1927
C II	1929
C III	1930
C IV	1930/1931	test type
D (Stahldoras)	1955/1965
DL65 (Doras)	1965/1966	built from poor metals
DL68	1968–1970
DL70	1970–1973
E I	1956/1957	prototype
E III	1962–1990
F74	1973–1975
F76	1976–1978
F79	1979–1981
F84	1984–85
F87	1986–88
F90 (Jäger)	1990–91
F92	1992–94
H95	1994–95
H97/H98	1997–99
H01	2000–02
J	2023–28	On order from Stadler Rail

When the city of Berlin planned the new Nord-Süd-Bahn, it ordered two cars in the Großprofil with a much greater width of 2.65 metres (8 ft 8 3/8 in) from the Linke-Hoffmann factory in Breslau. They were delivered in 1914 and put through trials by Siemens. The new cars with their bigger passenger capacity of 111 seats were intended to save money on the construction of platforms, because fewer cars were required to carry the passengers. This created a problem with platform access, which could only be solved in the 1950s and 1990s through enlargement of the platforms.

For the U-Bahn of the AEG company, today's U8, two prototypes were ordered from the Cologne train factory van der Zypen & Charlier. They were built in 1916, but were never put into service. The Berlin train authority used the two trains from 1921 on, on a suburb route.

==== B type cars ====
Only after the 1920s German inflation was over Großprofil cars could finally be ordered. In 1924, the first 16 multiple units and 8 normal passenger cars were delivered. Because they had big elliptical front windows, they were commonly called Tunneleulen ("tunnel owls"). The cars were 13.15 meters long and had 3 double sliding doors. This series was called BI.

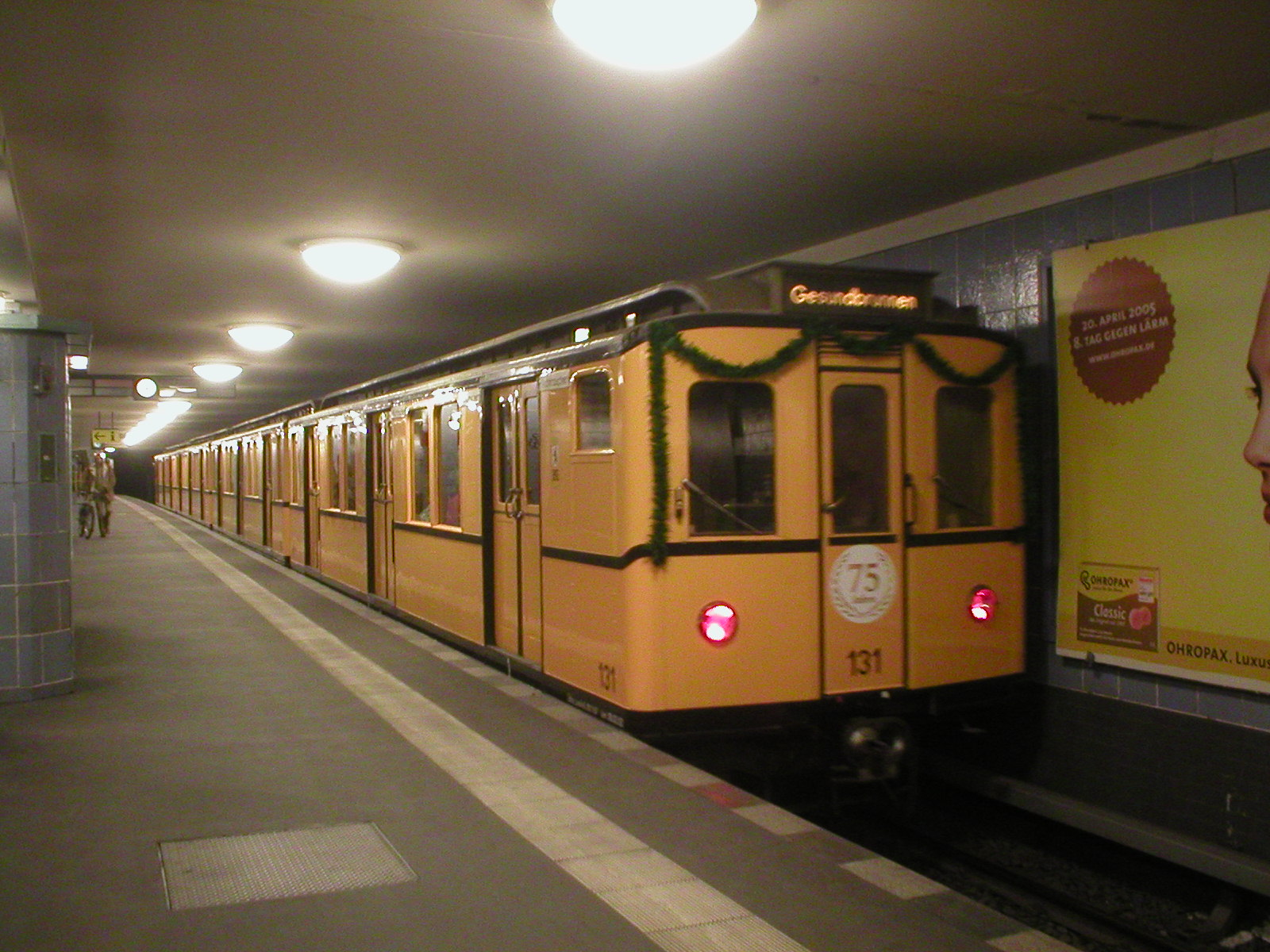
A BII type train on special service on the 75th anniversary of the U8

From 1927 to 1928, 20 further multiple units and 30 passenger cars were delivered to the Nord-Süd-Bahn AG. Because they had an improved propulsion system, they got the designation BII. They were all deployed to Line 6 and 8, before it was further redeployed in 1966 to Line 6. The last BI and BII trains were retired in the summer of 1969.

==== C type cars ====
As early as 1926, the first CI trains were trialed. They were 18 meters long and were tested thoroughly, before production started with the CII and CIII types. On the outside, CII and CIII trains were identical, but they were very different on the inside. The electricity driving the train was routed directly through the steering in the CII ("Schaltwerksteuerung"), while the CIII used the safer "Schützensteuerung" (with only a weak control current running through the controls).

In 1930 the first CIV cars were delivered. For the first time, aluminum was used as a construction material. This way, weight could be reduced by 12%.

Especially these CIV cars, but also some CII and CIII trains were seized by the Soviet occupation forces in 1945, which were stationed in the Friedrichsfelde workshop at that time. The trains were transported to Moscow and were used in the Metro until 1966.

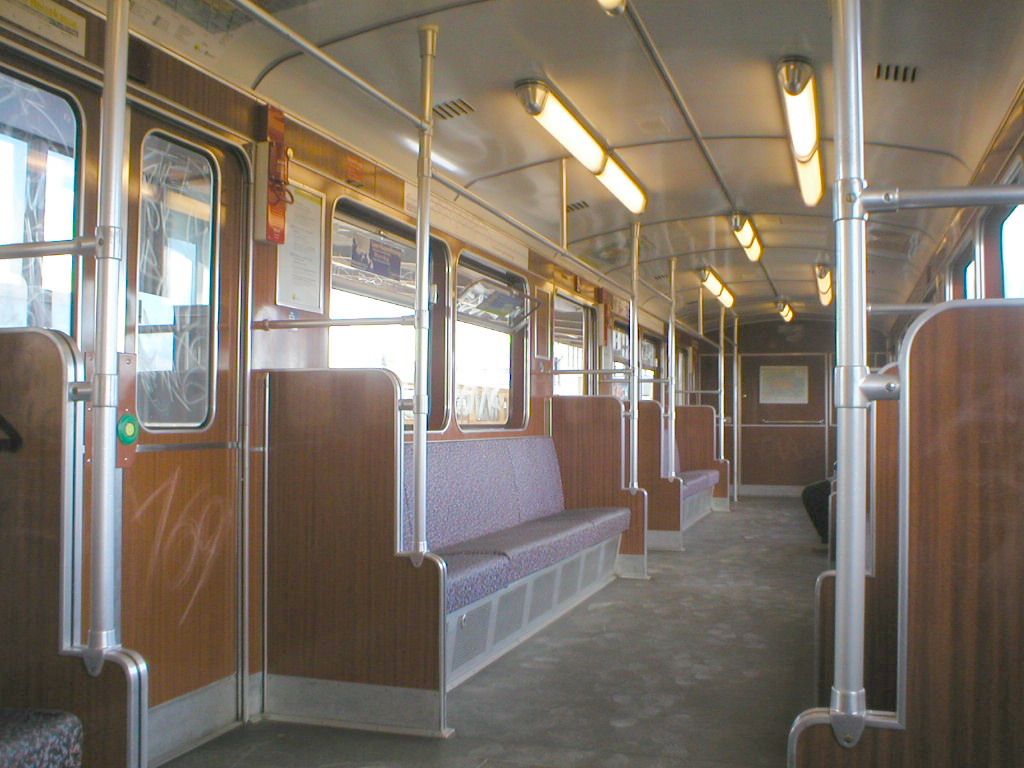
Interior of a DL train

==== D and DL type cars ====
After World War II the trains of the Berlin U-Bahn were worn out, making a new series of trains necessary. From 1957 on the new D type trains were delivered (also called Stahldora/Steel Dora). They were made of steel, making them very heavy. In 1965, the DL type was developed, which was constructed from lighter metals (also called Dora). This way, weight was reduced by 26%. Like in earlier types the seats were located along the sides of the train.

==== E type cars, transportation of cars to Moscow ====
In East Berlin, the vehicle situation was poor. Because the C-trains had been transported to Moscow as stated above, there were no Großprofil trains left for the Line E. So, just like in the beginning years of the Großprofil, Kleinprofil vehicles with boards attached to the sides were used. These trains had the designation AI K. 40 trains were being re-deployed to the Line E after the war. These "Blumenbratter" trains were also deployed on Line D on the Workers' Uprising and the Berlin strike in 1953. The actual last day of service was on 16 July 1994.

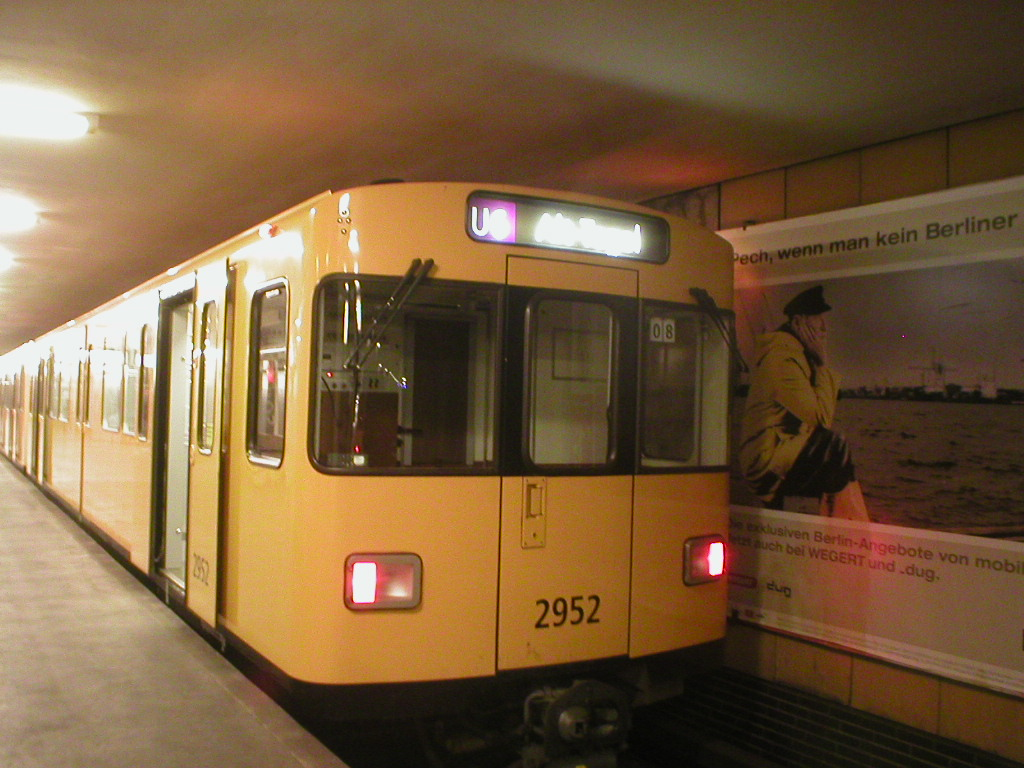
A F92 type train

==== F type cars ====
In West Berlin, the new F type followed the D and DL types. These trains were longer, built from light metal and had a different seating arrangement, with the two double seats at 90 degrees to the sides of the train. A test vehicle was built in 1973; it was scrapped in December 2006.

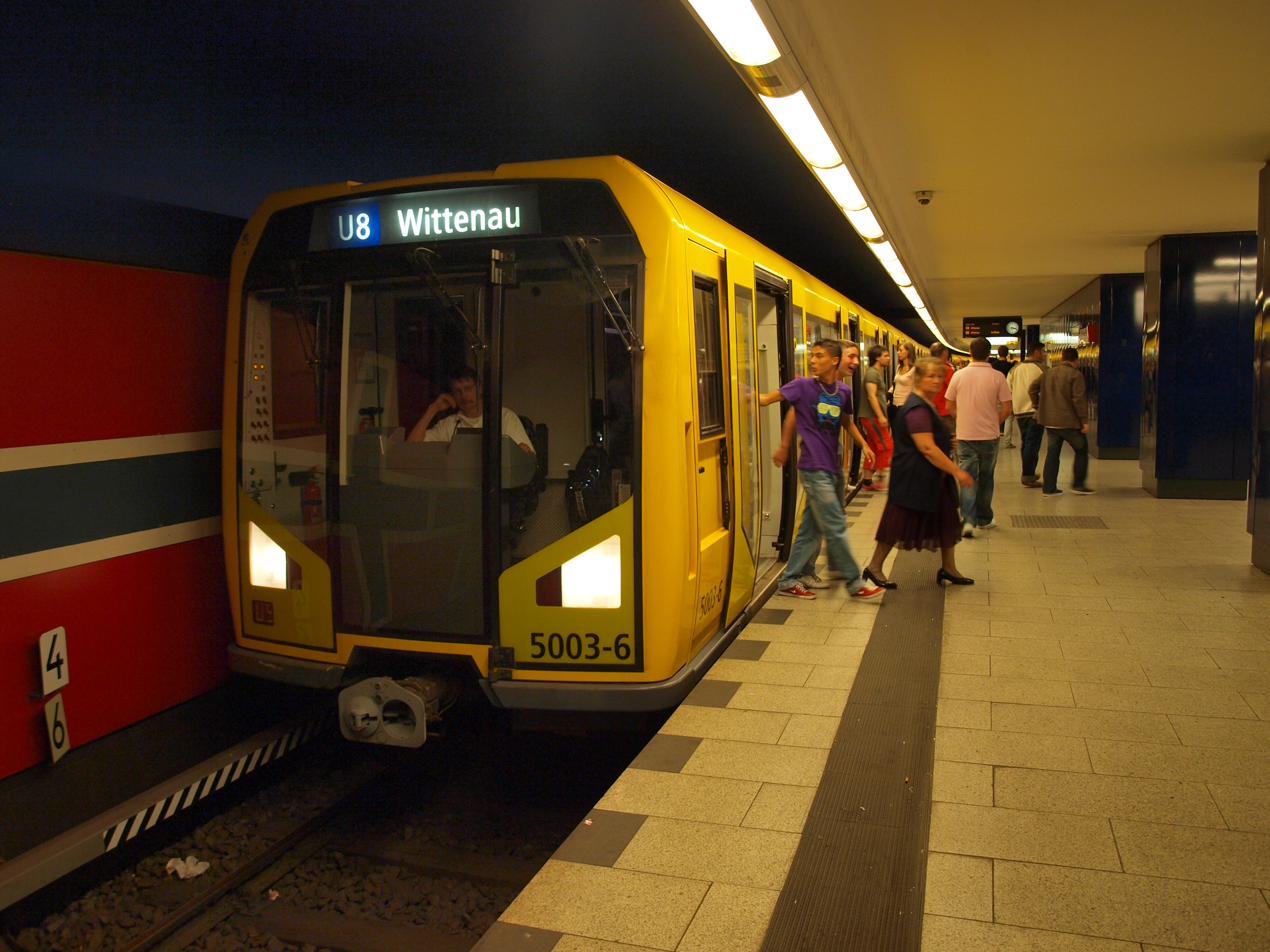
A H type train

==== H type cars ====
In the meanwhile, the F type had become quite old-fashioned, and the BVG decided to commission another new type. A train with completely joined compartments was chosen, and the seats along the car walls returned. This type was called H. In 1995 the first prototypes (H95) were delivered to the BVG. In 1998 and 2000 further batches (H97 and H01) were ordered from Adtranz. The interior was mainly painted white and yellow. The cars can only be uncoupled in a depot. These trains are manufactured by Bombardier Transportation.

Today, all H type cars ran on almost all lines.

==== I type cars ====
The BVG meanwhile awarded the I trains to Stadler Rail in 2014 and were delivered in 2016–2019. Two prototype four-car sets were initially ordered. In 2015, a production order for 64 sets was placed which are scheduled to be delivered in 2017–2021. These will replace the present D57/D60 units currently running on U55, as well as F74, F76 and F79 units that runs on U5, U7 and U8, and also expand the fleet for the U5 extension.
