= Line 2 (Athens Metro) =

Rapid transit line in Athens, Greece

Προς Ανθούπολη/Ελληνικό To Anthoupoli/Elliniko
- White number two on a red square
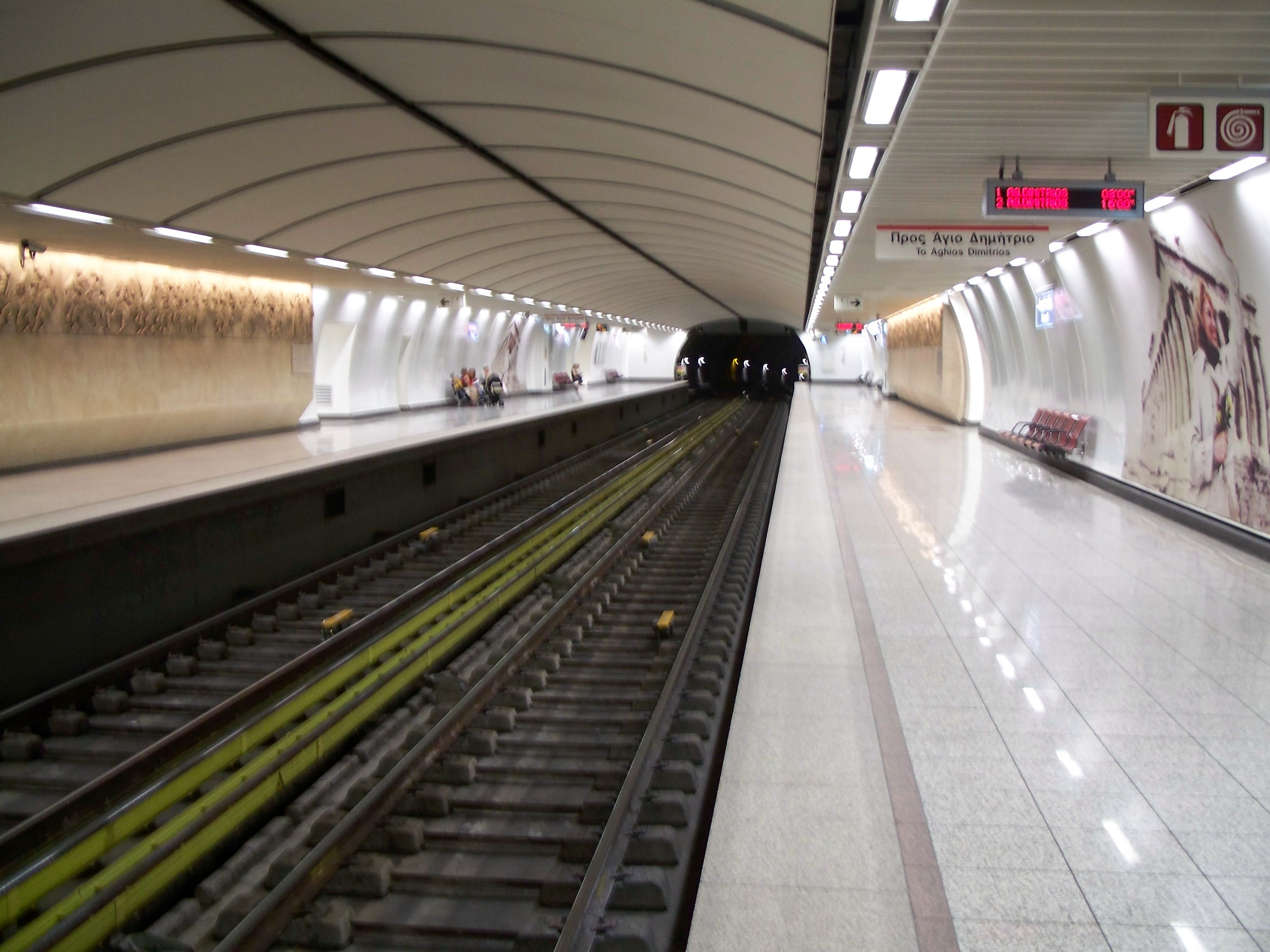
- Akropoli station platforms

Overview
- Locale: Athens
- Termini: Anthoupoli; Elliniko
- Stations: 20
- Colour on map: Red
- Website: Official website

Service
- Type: Rapid transit
- System: Athens Metro
- Operator: STASY
- Depots: Sepolia; Elliniko
- Rolling stock: 1st, 2nd (DC) and 3rd Generations

History
- Opened: 28 January 2000; 26 years ago
- Last extension: 26 July 2013

Technical
- Line length: 18.7 km (11.6 mi)
- Character: Deep-level
- Track gauge: 1,435 mm (4 ft 8 1/2 in) standard gauge
- Electrification: 750 V DC third rail

Line 2 of the Athens Metro runs entirely underground between Anthoupoli in the northwest and Elliniko in the south, via Syntagma. It first opened, between Sepolia and Syntagma, on 28 January 2000, with Line 3.

On 6 April 2013, Line 2 was extended to Anthoupoli in the north west, and on 26 July 2013 to Elliniko to the south.

== History ==
Line 2 is one of two modern metro lines, along with Line 3 that were built to reduce traffic congestion in the Athens urban area. Both lines were opened on 28 January 2000, with Line 2 initially running between Sepolia and Syntagma: the initial section of Line 2 included an interchange with Hellenic Train services (then operated directly by the Hellenic Railways Organisation) at Larissa Station, two interchanges with Line 1 at Attiki and Omonia, and one interchange with Line 3 at Syntagma.

The first extension of Line 2, between Syntagma and Dafni, opened on 15 November 2000.

== Future extensions ==
According to the Athens Metro Development Plan of September 2022, Elliniko Metro (who develops and builds Metro extensions) is exploring extensions to both ends of Line 2. Both extensions first appeared in the Souflias plan in April 2009, which envisaged the extension of Line 2 to Zefyri in the north, and Glyfada in the south. In September 2025, Elliniko Metro again confirmed their plans for these extensions of Line 2, having begun initial procedures for the extension to Agios Nikolaos in the north while the southern extension to Glyfada was still being studied. As part of this extension plan, the Elaionas depot (which is shared with Line 3) is planned to be upgraded to account for future passenger growth.

=== Extensions to Ilion and Acharnes ===
The first phase of the northern extension may consist of a 4.0 km (2.5 mi) line from Anthoupoli to Agios Nikolaos in 2031, with intermediate stations at Palatiani and Ilion (for Line 4): a second phase may consist of a line from Agios Nikolaos to Acharnes, with intermediate stations at Kamatero and Zefyri (for Athens Suburban Railway trains).

Stations of the Ilion extensions
Station	Municipality	Interchanges and notes
Palatiani	Ilion	
Ilion	Ilion	Interchange with Line 4.
Agios Nikolaos	Ilion	"Agios Nikolaos" is a provisional name for a planned station along the eponymous road. Not to be confused Aghios Nikolaos of Line 1

Stations of the Acharnes extension
Station	Municipality	Interchanges and notes
Kamatero	Agioi Anargyroi - Kamatero	
Zefyri	Fyli	Interchange with the Athens Suburban Railway
Aharnai	Acharnes	

Currently, Hellenic Metro is looking for companies to fund the initial extension to Ilion with major contenders being: TERNA, INTRAKAT, AVAX-GHELLA-ALSTOM, AKTOR-METKA, it is also possible that the EU helps fund this project. With the funding reaching an estimated 550 million euros needed.

=== Extension to Glyfada ===
The southern extension may consist of a 4.4 km (2.7 mi) line from Elliniko to Glyfada, with intermediate stations at Ano Glyfada and Grigoriou Lampraki.

Stations of the Glyfada extension
Station	Municipality	Interchanges and notes
Ano Glyfada	Glyfada	
Grigoriou Lampraki	Glyfada	"Grigoriou Lampraki" is a provisional name for a planned station at the junction with the eponymous road and Vouliagmenis Avenue.
Glyfada	Glyfada	Interchange with the Athens Tram at Platia Vaso Katraki.

=== Cancelled proposals ===
There was a plan for Line 2 to have a branch line from Panepistimio to Alsos Veikou: that proposal was absorbed by the U-shaped Line 4 on 1 December 2005, with Georgios Souflias (then Minister for the Environment, Physical Planning and Public Works) stating that the branch line proposal would have limited the frequency of trains on either branch. The branch line was similar to a part of Line 4 now under construction, but it did not include Elikonos.

== Map ==
The route of Line 2

== Stations ==
The spelling of the station names on this table, in English and Greek, are according to the signage. All Line 2 stations, except for Agios Dimitrios, have two tracks and two side platforms: Agios Dimitrios has an island platform layout.

†	Terminal station
#	Interchange station

Station English	Station Greek	Image	Municipality	Opened	Interchanges and notes	Position
Anthoupoli^{†}	Ανθούπολη		Peristeri	6 April 2013		38.016980°N 23.690985°E
Peristeri	Περιστέρι		Peristeri	6 April 2013		38.012785°N 23.695845°E
Aghios Antonios	Άγιος Αντώνιος		Peristeri	9 August 2004		38.006200°N 23.699565°E
Sepolia	Σεπόλια		Athens	28 January 2000		38.002675°N 23.713540°E
Attiki^{#}	Αττική		Athens	28 January 2000 (Note: The Line 1 station opened on 30 June 1949.)	Interchange with Line 1.	37.999230°N 23.722350°E
Larissa Station^{#}	Σταθμός Λαρίσης		Athens	28 January 2000 (Note: The opening date applies to the Line 2 station only.)	Interchange with the Athens Suburban Railway and Hellenic Train at Athens.	37.992140°N 23.721200°E
Metaxourghio	Μεταξουργείο		Athens	28 January 2000		37.986770°N 23.720710°E
Omonia^{#}	Ομόνοια		Athens	28 January 2000 (Note: The Line 1 station opened on 17 May 1895, and was resited on 21 July 1930.)	Interchange with Line 1.	37.984030°N 23.727970°E
Panepistimio	Πανεπιστήμιο		Athens	28 January 2000	Interchange with future Line 4 at a separate station called Akadimia.	37.980235°N 23.732985°E
Syntagma^{#}	Σύνταγμα		Athens	28 January 2000	Interchange with Line 3 and the Athens Tram.	37.974790°N 23.735535°E
Akropoli	Ακρόπολη		Athens	15 November 2000		37.968675°N 23.729410°E
Sygrou–Fix^{#}	Συγγρού–Φίξ		Athens	15 November 2000	Interchange with the Athens Tram at Fix.	37.964245°N 23.726410°E
Neos Kosmos^{#}	Νέος Κόσμος		Athens	15 November 2000	Interchange with the Athens Tram.	37.957655°N 23.728335°E
Aghios Ioannis	Άγιος Ιωάννης		Athens	15 November 2000		37.956315°N 23.734575°E
Dafni	Δάφνη		Agios Dimitrios; Dafni-Ymittos	15 November 2000		37.949160°N 23.737245°E
Aghios Dimitrios; Alexandros Panagoulis	Άγιος Δημήτριος; Αλέξανδρος Παναγούλης		Agios Dimitrios; Ilioupoli	5 June 2004		37.940150°N 23.740645°E
Ilioupoli; Grigoris Lambrakis	Ηλιούπολη; Γρηγόρης Λαμπράκης		Agios Dimitrios; Ilioupoli	26 July 2013	This station originally opened without the Grigoris Lambrakis qualifier: the station adopted the current name on 22 May 2015.	37.929260°N 23.744715°E
Alimos	Άλιμος		Alimos	26 July 2013		37.918160°N 23.744060°E
Argyroupoli	Αργυρούπολη		Elliniko-Argyroupoli	26 July 2013		37.902575°N 23.745540°E
Elliniko^{†}	Ελληνικό		Elliniko-Argyroupoli	26 July 2013		37.892715°N 23.747035°E
