= Agios Dimitrios metro station =

Athens Metro station

Άγιος Δημήτριος-Αλέξανδρος Παναγούλης Aghios Dimitrios-Alexandros Panagoulis
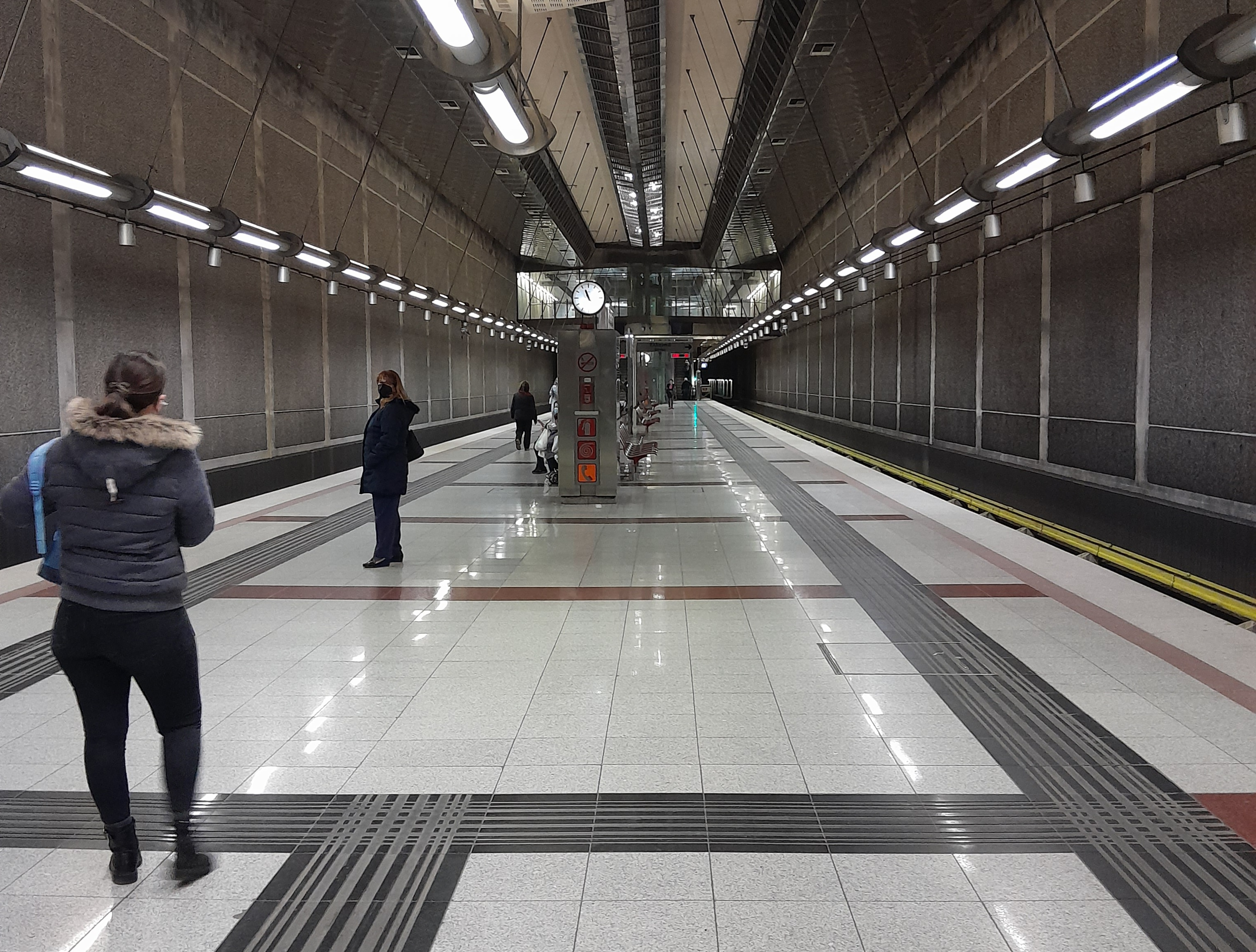
- Station platforms

General information
- Location: Agios Dimitrios, Athens; Greece
- Coordinates: 37°56′25″N 23°44′26.5″E
- Manager: STASY
- Line: Athens Metro Line 2
- Platforms: 1 (island)
- Tracks: 2

Construction
- Structure type: Underground
- Accessible: Yes

Key dates
- 5 June 2004: Opened

Services
Preceding station	Athens Metro	Following station
Dafni towards Anthoupoli	Line 2	Ilioupoli towards Elliniko
Location

Agios Dimitrios–Alexandros Panagoulis (Greek: Άγιος Δημήτριος–Αλέξανδρος Παναγούλης), commonly known as Agios Dimitrios, and also known as Aghios Dimitrios on signage, is a station on Line 2 of the Athens Metro. It served as the line's terminus from 5 June 2004, when it was inaugurated, until the extension to Elliniko opened on 26 July 2013. The station took its name from the municipality of Agios Dimitrios (Brahami), which is the area it serves, also the station has the name of Alexandros Panagoulis, a fighter against the dictatorial regime of 1967-1974 and later Member of Parliament, who was killed in a car crash at the point where the station is situated on 1 May 1976. The station is located beneath Vouliagmenis Avenue. It is entirely underground and has a central island platform, at the ends of which are the stairways, escalators & lifts up to the concourse level from which there are 4 exits to street level. The station is attached to Athens Metro Mall, one of Athens' major shopping centers.

In the initial plans to build Metro Line 2 the station Agios Dimitrios-Alexandros Panagoulis was known by name "Ilioupoli" (not to be confused with the current Ilioupoli station), which came from the municipality of Ilioupoli, one of the areas which it serves. During construction of the station it was decided to rename the station to "Alexandros Panagoulis". However shortly before the inauguration of the station it was decided to once more rename the station to its current name to appear more relevant to the municipality it serves.
