= Argyroupoli metro station =

Athens Metro station

Αργυρούπολη Argyroupoli
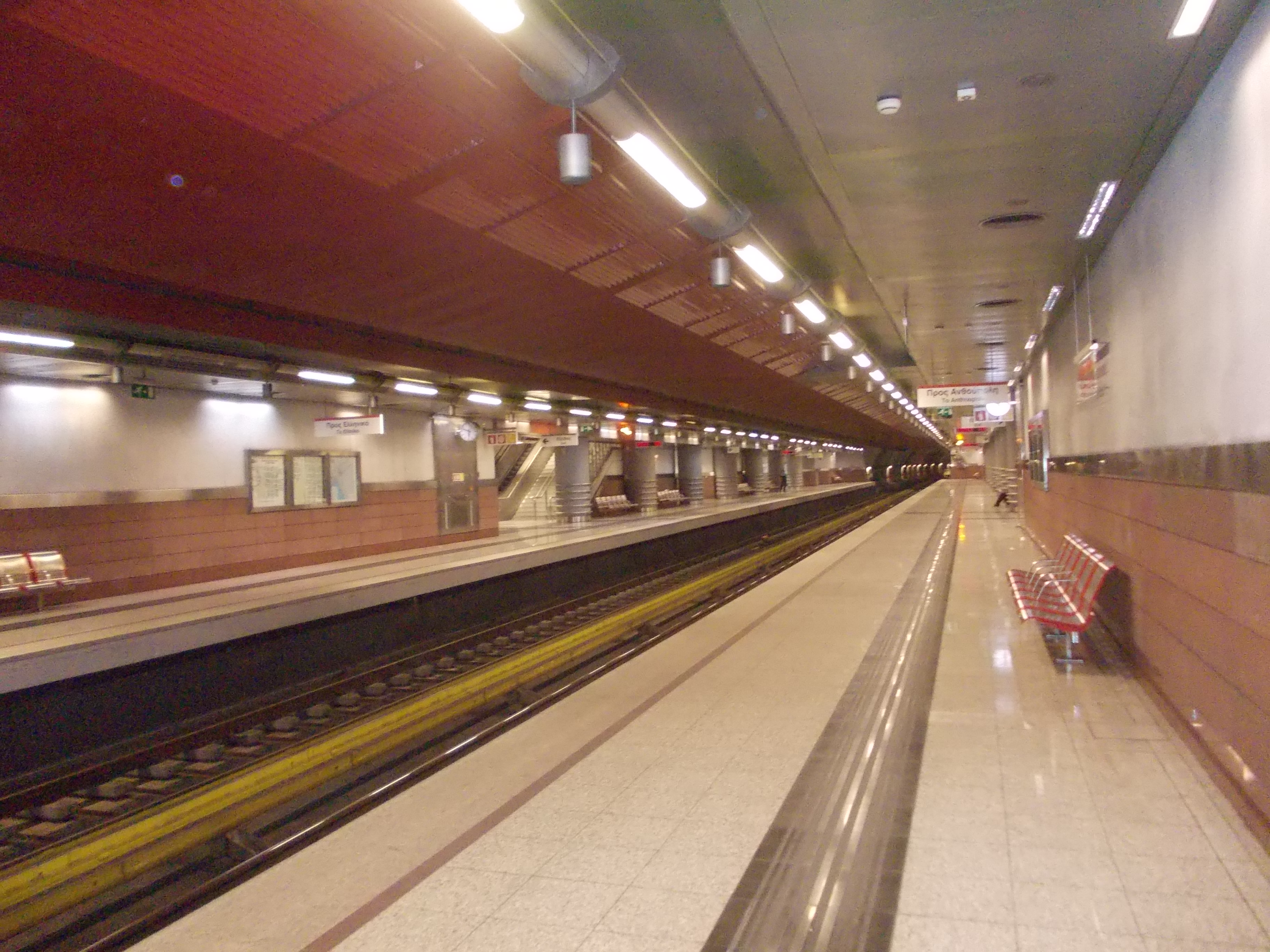
- Station platforms

General information
- Location: Argyroupoli, Athens; Greece
- Coordinates: 37°54′11.0″N 23°44′45.25″E
- Manager: STASY
- Line: Athens Metro Line 2
- Platforms: 2
- Tracks: 2

Construction
- Structure type: Underground
- Accessible: Yes

Key dates
- 26 July 2013: Opened

Services
Preceding station	Athens Metro	Following station
Alimos towards Anthoupoli	Line 2	Elliniko Terminus
Location

Argyroupoli (Greek: Αργυρούπολη) is an intermediate station on Athens Metro Line 2. It opened with the Elliniko extension on 26 July 2013. The station is adjacent to Vouliagmenis Avenue.

== Station layout ==
G Ground	-	Exits
C Concourse	Concourse	Customer Service, Tickets
P Platforms	Side platform, doors will open on the right
P Platforms	Platform 1	← towards Anthoupoli (Alimos)
P Platforms	Platform 2	→ towards Elliniko (Terminus) →
P Platforms	Side platform, doors will open on the right
