= Argyroupoli =

Argyroupoli Αργυρούπολη
- Municipal unit
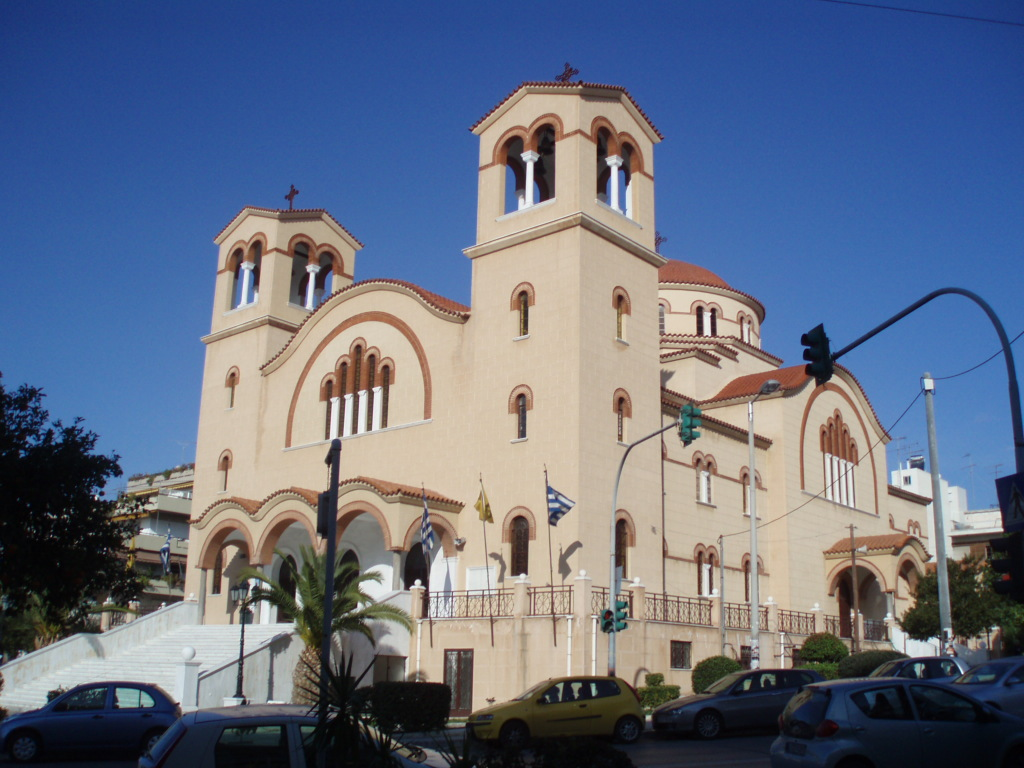
- The church of the Holy Trinity

- Location within the South Athens regional unit

- Location within Greece
- Coordinates: 37°54′N 23°45′E
- Country: Greece
- Administrative region: Attica
- Regional unit: South Athens
- Municipality: Elliniko-Argyroupoli
- City established: 1926 (100 years ago)
- Districts: Ano (Upper) Argyroupoli; Kato (Lower) Argyroupoli

Area
  - Municipal unit: 8.228 km^{2} (3.177 sq mi)
- Elevation: 50 m (160 ft)

Population (2021)
  - Municipal unit: 33,312
  - Municipal unit density: 4,049/km^{2} (10,490/sq mi)
- Time zone: UTC+2 (EET)
  - Summer (DST): UTC+3 (EEST)
- Postal code: 164 xx
- Area code: 210
- Vehicle registration: Z
- Website: www.elliniko-argyroupoli.gr

Argyroupoli (Greek: Αργυρούπολη) is a town and a suburb in the southern part of the Athens agglomeration, Greece. Since the 2011 local government reform it is part of the Elliniko-Argyroupoli municipality, of which it is the seat and a municipal unit. A bustling suburb today, it is known for its cafés, restaurants, and bars.

== Name ==
The city's name derives from the Greek words άργυρος (árgyros meaning silver) and πόλη (poli meaning city). The name's older form was Argyroupolis. The first name of the settlement was New Argyroupolis, given by the refugees from Gümüşhane, Turkey.

== History ==
As a part of the population exchange between Greece and Turkey after the Greco-Turkish war of 1919-1922, a number of refugees fled to Attica from the former Ottoman Empire. In 1926, refugees from Argyroupolis in northeastern Turkey (modern Gümüşhane meaning "silver house") arrived in site, then named Ktima Geroulanou (Greek: Κτήμα Γερουλάνου). They named the new settlement Nea Argyroupolis as a remembrance to their old hometown. There was presumably much resemblance between the two towns as, Argyroupoli is built on a plain with the Hymettus mountain to its north, as Gümüşhane is built on a plain with the Pontic Alps to the north. One of the first tasks of the settlers was to build the church of Αγία Βαρβάρα (St. Barbara), named after the patron saint of the now Turkish city.

During the Second World War, the settlement was used by the Germans to protect their ammunition and airplanes that were stationed in the nearby airfield. On December 6, 1943, the settlement was bombed by the British Royal Air Force. Although there were reportedly no casualties amongst the population, the settlement was razed to the ground.

The settlement was part of the community of Kalamaki until 1949, when it became a separate community. It was elevated to municipality status in 1972.

== Geography ==
Argyroupoli is situated on the southwestern foot of the Hymettus mountain, 9 km (6 mi) south of Athens city centre. The municipality has an area of 8.228 km^{2}. It borders Ilioupoli municipality to the North, Alimos municipality and Elliniko municipal district to the West and Glyfada municipality to the South. The city is traversed by the Vouliagmenis Avenue, which connects downtown Athens with the southern suburbs. The three major shopping districts are Kyprou Avenue, M. Geroulanou Avenue, and a part of Vouliagmenis Avenue. Numerous public bus lines run through Argyroupoli connecting the district with Athens centre and Glyfada. The subway stations that serve the suburb are Argyroupoli metro station and Alimos metro station.

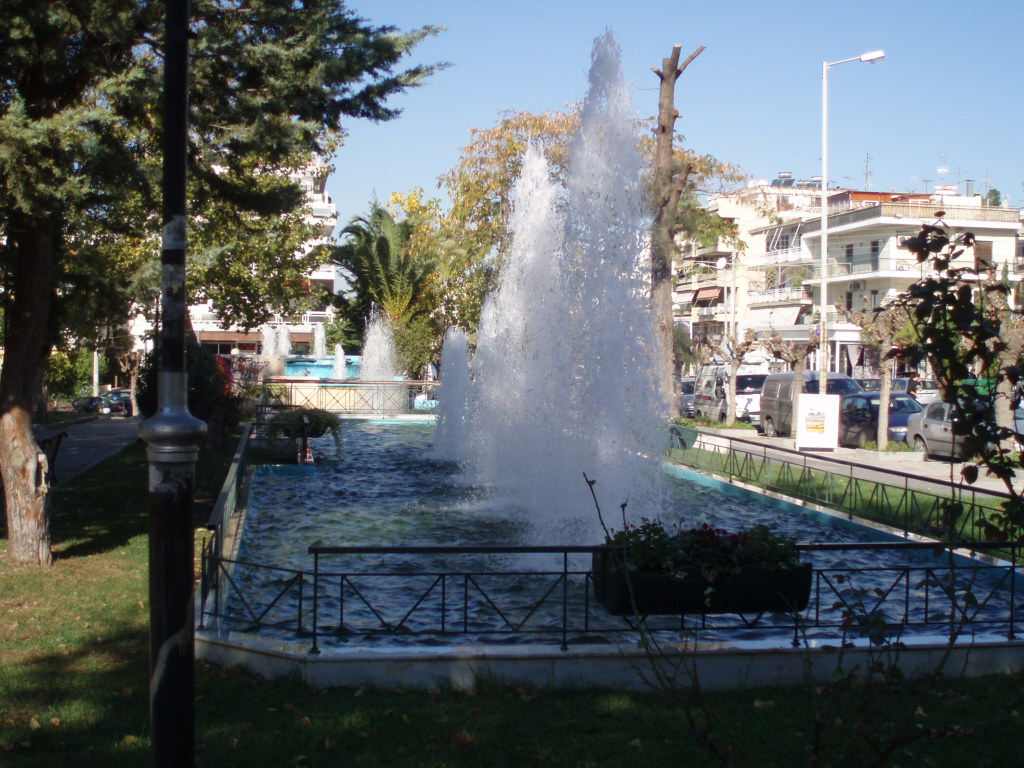
Kosta Varnali Square in Argyroupoli

Argyroupoli has a mild climate, affected by the sea and the mountain. It rarely snows there, but rain is a common feature. During summer, high temperatures are recorded.

== Historical population ==
Year	Population
1971	13,956
1981	26,108
1991	31,530
2001	33,158
2011	34,097
2021	33,312

== International relations ==
Argyroupoli is twinned with:

- Castanet-Tolosan, France
- Moncalieri, Italy

== Notable people ==
- Vanessa Adamopoulou, singer
- Katerina Georgiadou, fashion model
- Ioannis Papazisis, actor
- Kostas Tsakonas, actor
