= Alimos metro station =

Athens Metro station

Άλιμος Alimos
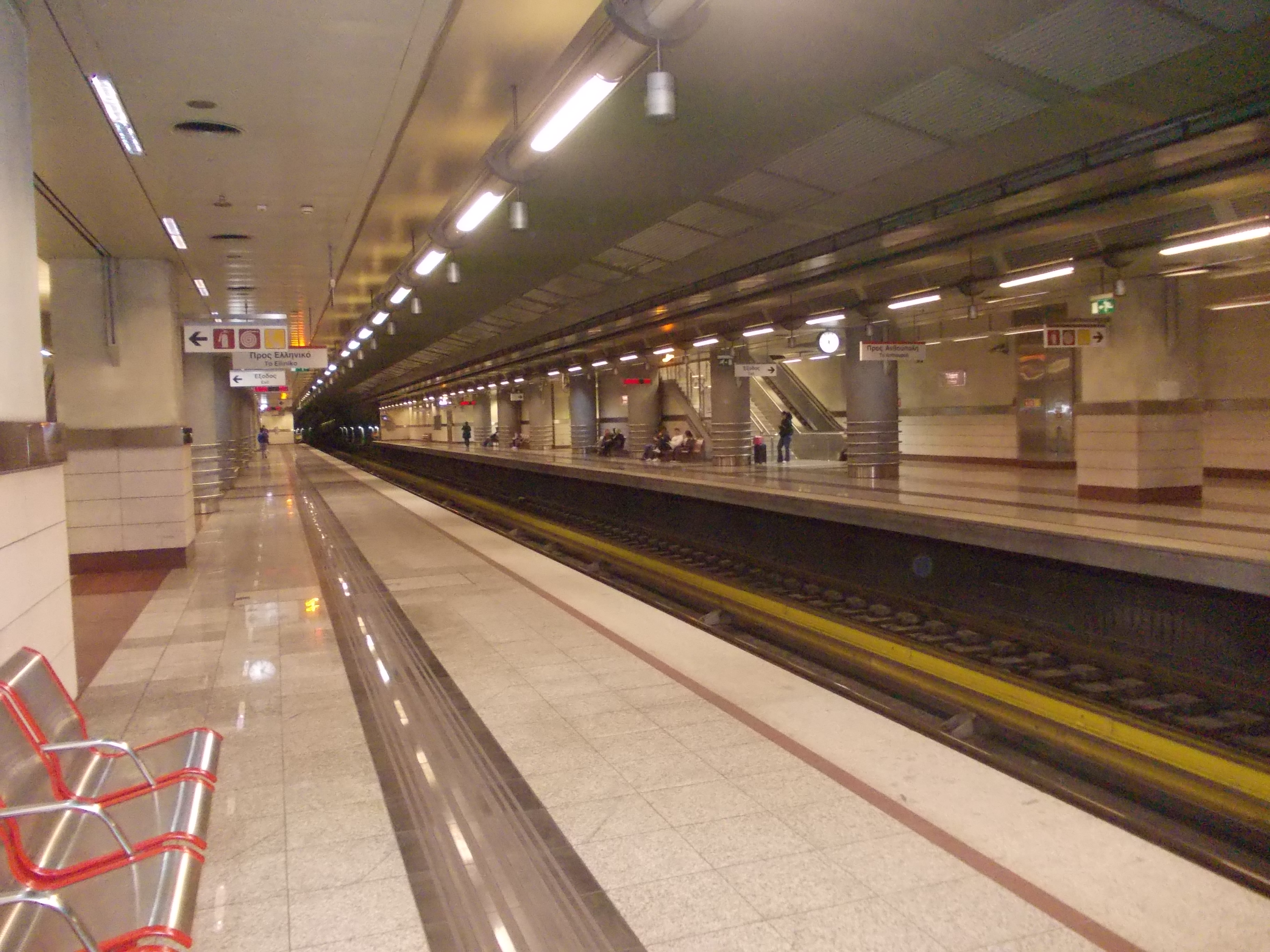
- Station platforms

General information
- Location: Alimos, Athens; Greece
- Coordinates: 37°55′05″N 23°44′40.25″E
- Manager: STASY
- Line: Athens Metro Line 2
- Platforms: 2
- Tracks: 2

Construction
- Structure type: Underground
- Accessible: Yes

Key dates
- 26 July 2013: Opened

Services
Preceding station	Athens Metro	Following station
Ilioupoli towards Anthoupoli	Line 2	Argyroupoli towards Elliniko
Location

Alimos (Greek: Άλιμος) is an intermediate station on Athens Metro Line 2. It opened with the Elliniko extension on 26 July 2013. The station is adjacent to Vouliagmenis Avenue.

== Station layout ==
G Ground	-	Exits
C Concourse	Concourse	Customer Service, Tickets
P Platforms	Side platform, doors will open on the right
P Platforms	Platform 1	← towards Anthoupoli (Ilioupoli)
P Platforms	Platform 2	→ towards Elliniko (Argyroupoli) →
P Platforms	Side platform, doors will open on the right
