= Metaxourgeio metro station =

Athens Metro station

Μεταξουργείο Metaxourghio
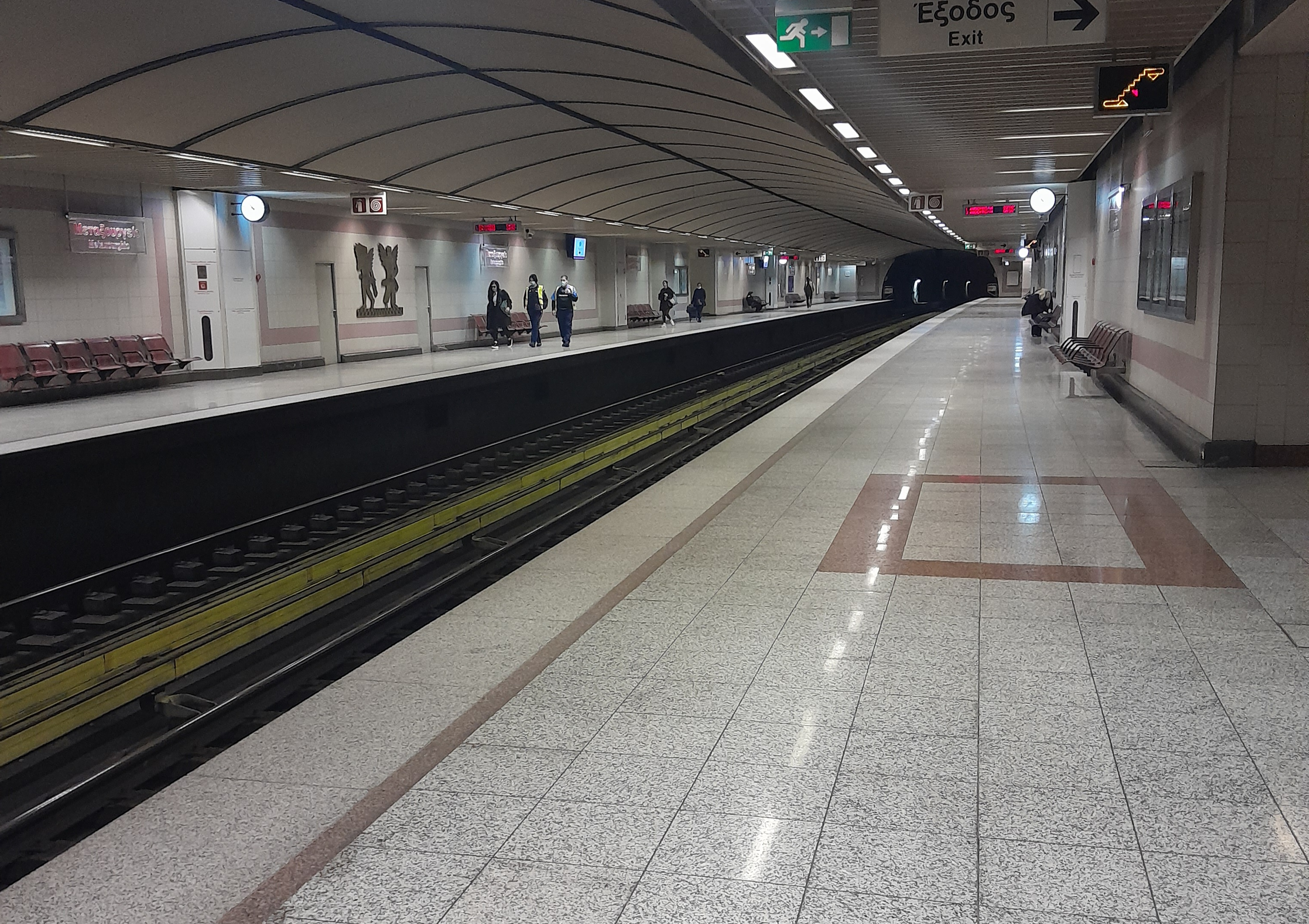
- Metaxourghio station platform

General information
- Location: Athens; Greece
- Coordinates: 37.9858°N 23.7210°E
- Manager: STASY
- Line: Athens Metro Line 2
- Platforms: 2
- Tracks: 2

Construction
- Structure type: Underground
- Accessible: Yes

Key dates
- 28 January 2000: Opened

Services
Preceding station	Athens Metro	Following station
Larissa Station towards Anthoupoli	Line 2	Omonia towards Elliniko
Location

Metaxourgeio (Greek: Μεταξουργείο), also known as Metaxourghio on signage, is a station on Athens Metro Line 2. It opened in January 2000 as one of the 7 first stations of line 2. It is located west of Omonoia Square.

== Station layout ==
G Ground	-	Exits
C Concourse	Concourse	Customer Service, Tickets
P Platforms	Side platform, doors will open on the right
P Platforms	Platform 1	← towards Anthoupoli (Larissa Station)
P Platforms	Platform 2	→ towards Elliniko (Omonia) →
P Platforms	Side platform, doors will open on the right
