= Ilioupoli metro station =

Athens Metro station

Ηλιούπολη-Γρηγόρης Λαμπράκης Ilioupoli-Grigoris Lambrakis
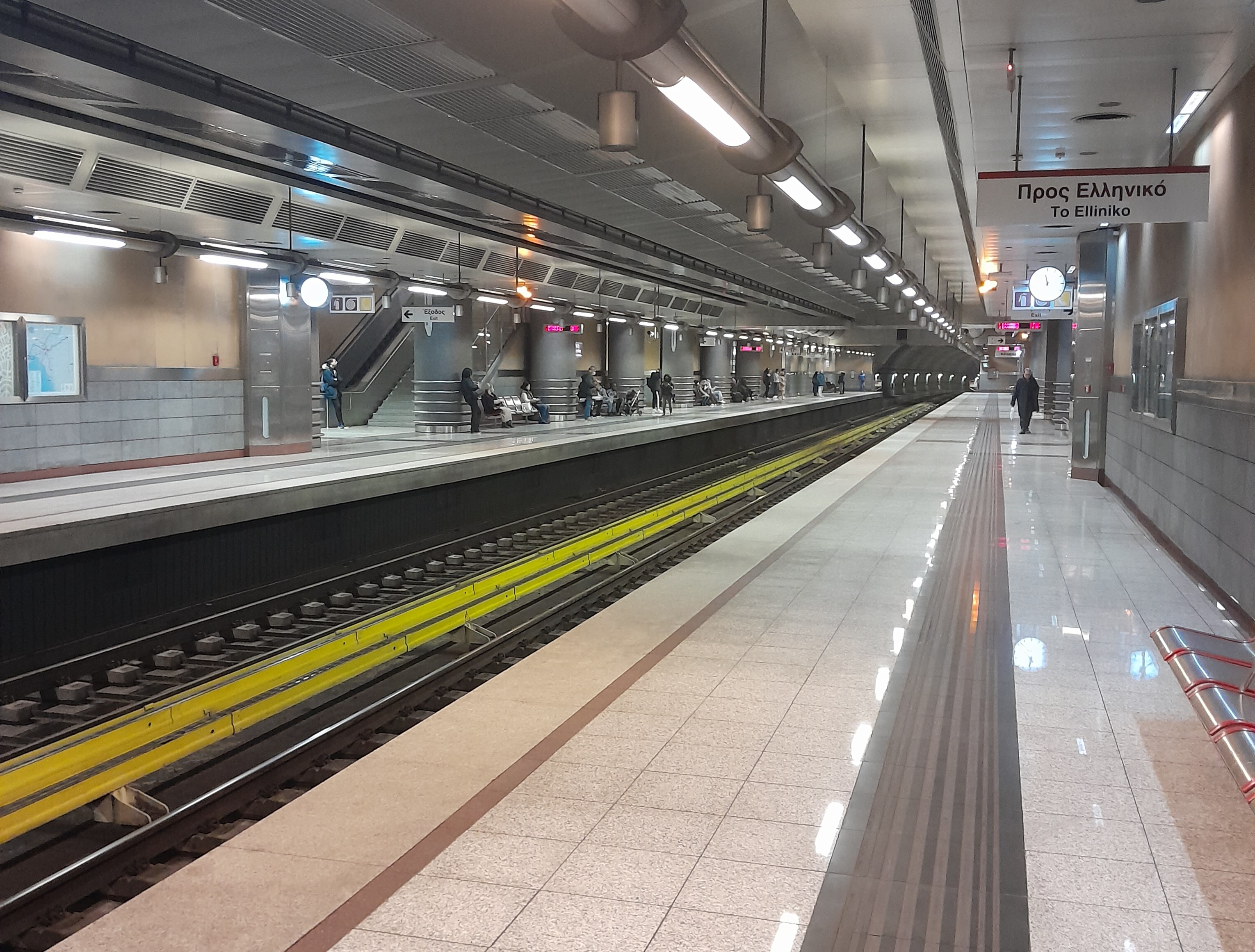
- Station platforms

General information
- Other names: Ilioupoli
- Location: Ilioupoli, Athens; Greece
- Coordinates: 37°55′46.5″N 23°44′40.25″E
- Manager: STASY
- Line: Athens Metro Line 2
- Platforms: 2
- Tracks: 2

Construction
- Structure type: Underground
- Accessible: Yes

Key dates
- 26 July 2013: Opened

Services
Preceding station	Athens Metro	Following station
Agios Dimitrios towards Anthoupoli	Line 2	Alimos towards Elliniko
Location

Ilioupoli, also known as Ilioupoli–Grigoris Lambrakis (Greek: Ηλιούπολη–Γρηγόρης Λαμπράκης), is an intermediate station on Athens Metro Line 2. It opened with the Elliniko extension on 26 July 2013. The station is adjacent to Vouliagmenis Avenue.

== History ==
Ilioupoli originally opened without the Grigoris Lambrakis qualifier, but the Municipality of Ilioupoli had for years requested Attiko Metro (now Elliniko Metro) to name the station after the anti-war activist, who was also a member of the Greek resistance. Elliniko Metro agreed to change the station name to Ilioupoli-Grigoris Lambrakis, which came into effect on 22 May 2015.

== Station layout ==
G Ground	-	Exits
C Concourse	Concourse	Customer Service, Tickets
P Platforms	Side platform, doors will open on the right
P Platforms	Platform 1	← towards Anthoupoli (Agios Dimitrios)
P Platforms	Platform 2	→ towards Elliniko (Alimos) →
P Platforms	Side platform, doors will open on the right
