= Peristeri metro station =

Athens Metro station

Περιστέρι Peristeri
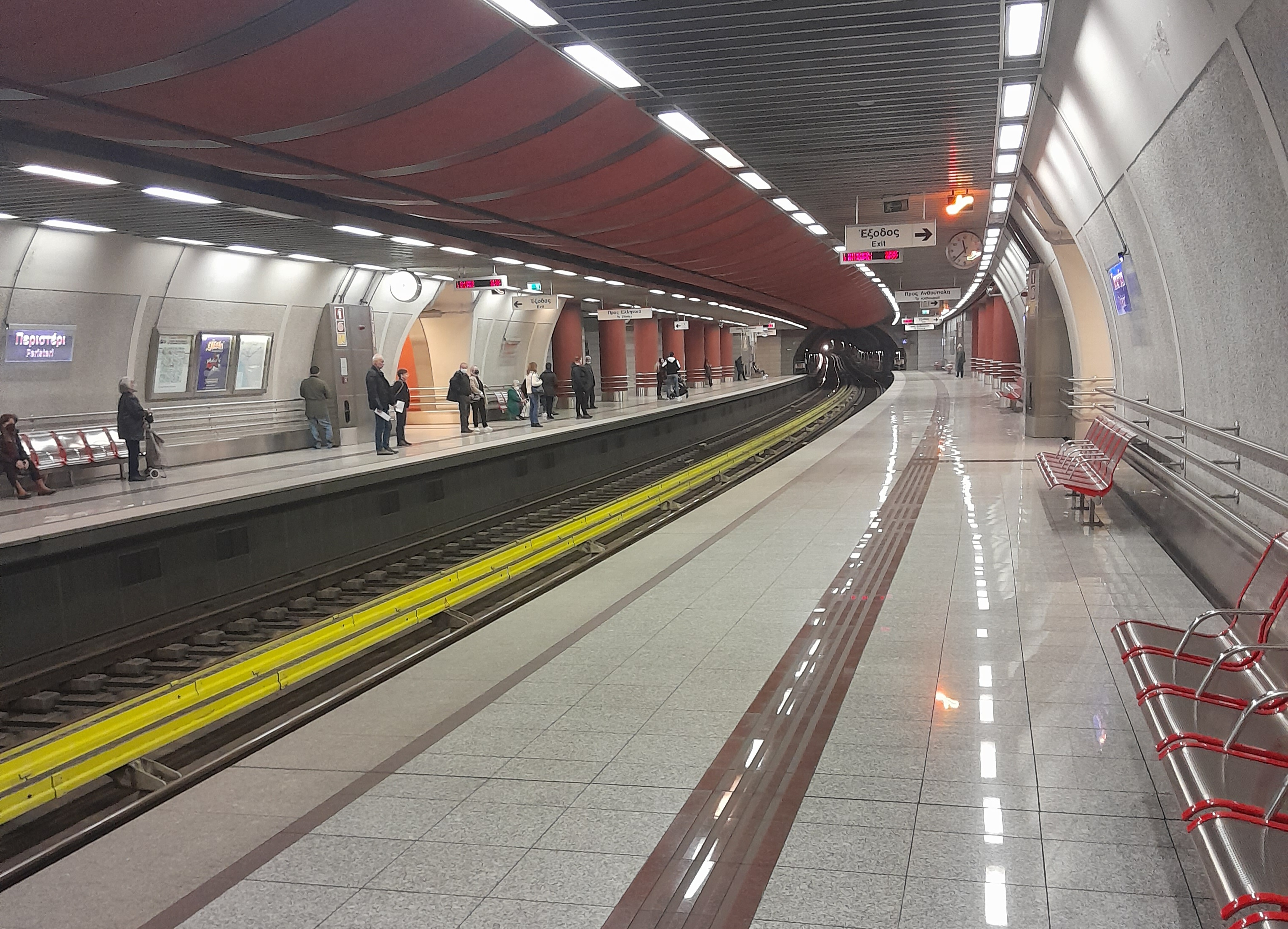
- Station platforms

General information
- Location: Plateia Dimokratias; 121 34 Peristeri; Greece
- Coordinates: 38°00′46.73″N 23°41′44.63″E
- Manager: STASY
- Line: Athens Metro Line 2
- Platforms: 2
- Tracks: 2

Construction
- Structure type: Underground
- Accessible: Yes

Key dates
- 6 April 2013: Opened

Services
Preceding station	Athens Metro	Following station
Anthoupoli Terminus	Line 2	Agios Antonios towards Elliniko
Location

Peristeri (Greek: Περιστέρι) is a station of Athens Metro Line 2 since the Anthoupoli extension opened on 6 April 2013.

== Station layout ==
G Ground	-	Exits
C Concourse	Concourse	Customer Service, Tickets
P Platforms	Side platform, doors will open on the right
P Platforms	Platform 1	← towards Anthoupoli (Terminus)
P Platforms	Platform 2	→ towards Elliniko (Agios Antonios) →
P Platforms	Side platform, doors will open on the right
