= Dafni metro station =

Athens Metro station

Δάφνη Dafni
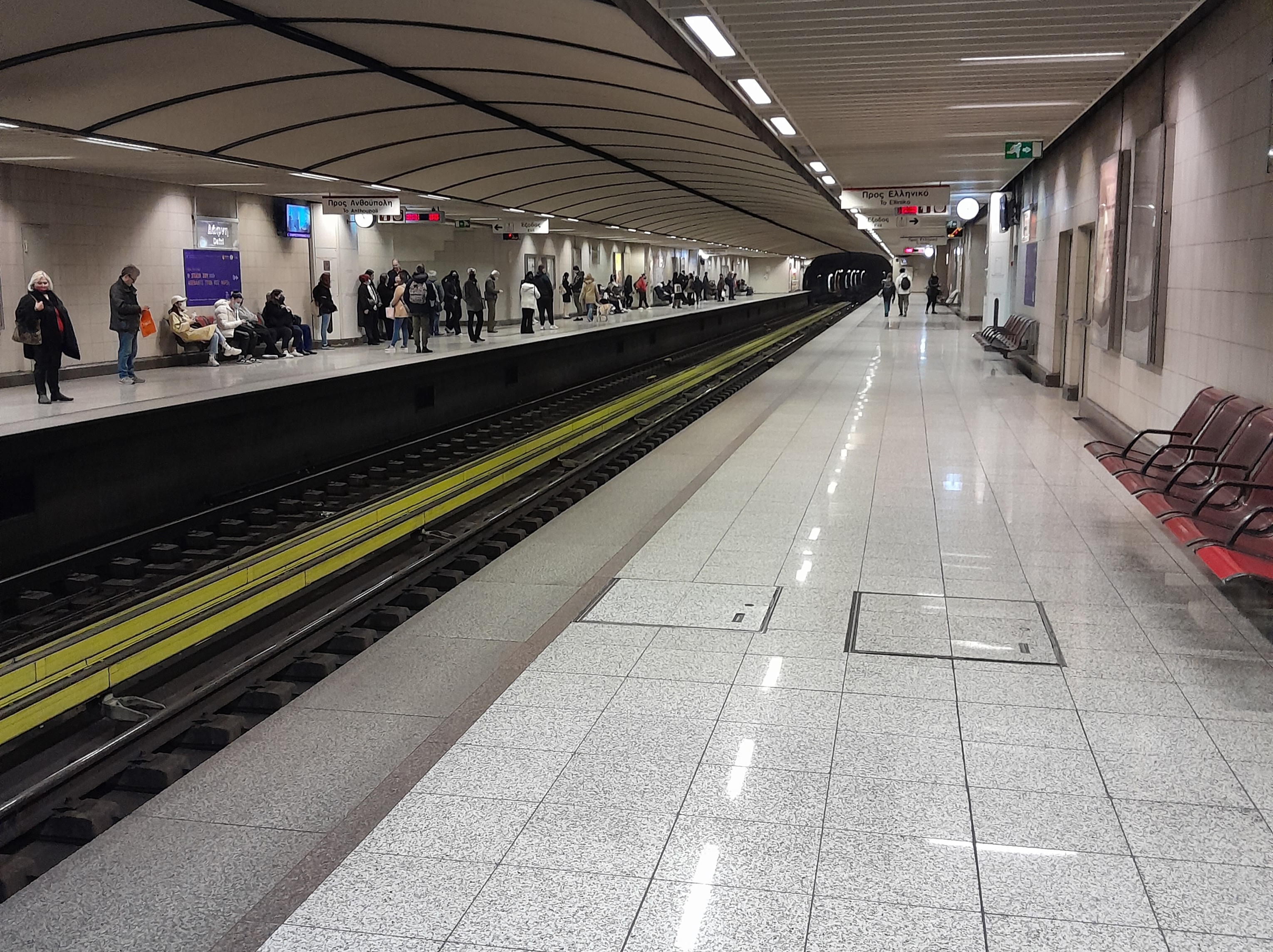
- Station platforms

General information
- Location: Dafni, Athens; Greece
- Coordinates: 37°56′57.25″N 23°44′14.0″E
- Manager: STASY
- Line: Athens Metro Line 2
- Platforms: 2
- Tracks: 2

Construction
- Structure type: Underground
- Accessible: Yes

Key dates
- 15 November 2000: Opened

Services
Preceding station	Athens Metro	Following station
Agios Ioannis towards Anthoupoli	Line 2	Agios Dimitrios towards Elliniko
Location

Dafni (Greek: Δάφνη) is a metro station on Athens Metro Line 2, which opened on 15 November 2000, and was the line's terminus until 5 June 2004, when Agios Dimitrios station opened.

== Art works ==
- Dimitris Mytaras' Dexileos is at the ticket hall level.

== Interchange station with city buses ==
Dafni Station has also platforms in the ground for local buses. The bus station "Dafni Station" (Greek: "Σταθμός Δάφνη") is consisted of three platforms where buses are starting, finishing their route or make a stop.

The following lines start/end at the city bus interchange station located near the metro station:

- 141 (Dafni Station-Kalamaki)
- 212 (Dafni Station-Ymittos-Vironas-Kareas)
- 217 (Piraeus-Dafni Station)
- 218 (Piraeus-Dafni Station)
- 219 (Dafni Station-Kallithea Station)
- 229 (Piraeus-Dafni Station)
- 816 (Taurus-Agios Dimitrios)
- X97 (Dafni Station-Airport) (Routes only after midnight. The rest of the day bus starts from Elliniko Station)

The following circular lines stop at the station:

- 112 (Agios Dimitrios-Dafni Station)
- 131 (Agios Dimitrios Bus Park-Dafni Station)
- 206 (Agia Marina-Dafni Station)
- 237 (Ano Ilioupolis-Dafni Station)

The circular lines make stops in the station. The other buses have start/finish in the station.

== Station layout ==
G Ground	-	Exits
C Concourse	Concourse	Customer Service, Tickets
P Platforms	Side platform, doors will open on the right
P Platforms	Platform 1	← towards Anthoupoli (Agios Ioannis)
P Platforms	Platform 2	→ towards Elliniko (Agios Dimitrios) →
P Platforms	Side platform, doors will open on the right
