= Ilioupoli =

Ilioupoli Ηλιούπολη
- Municipality
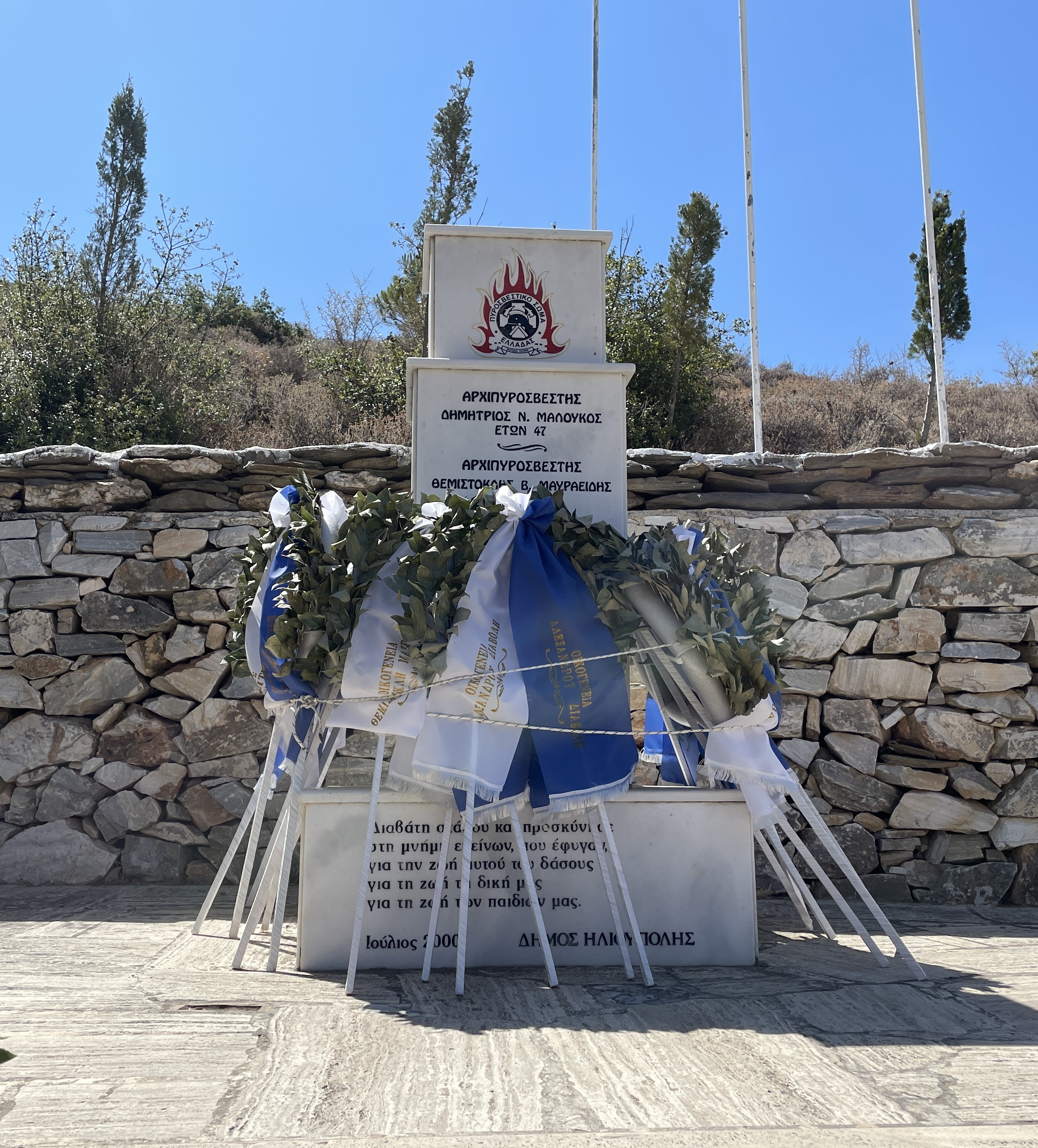
- Firefighter's memorial in Ilioupoli

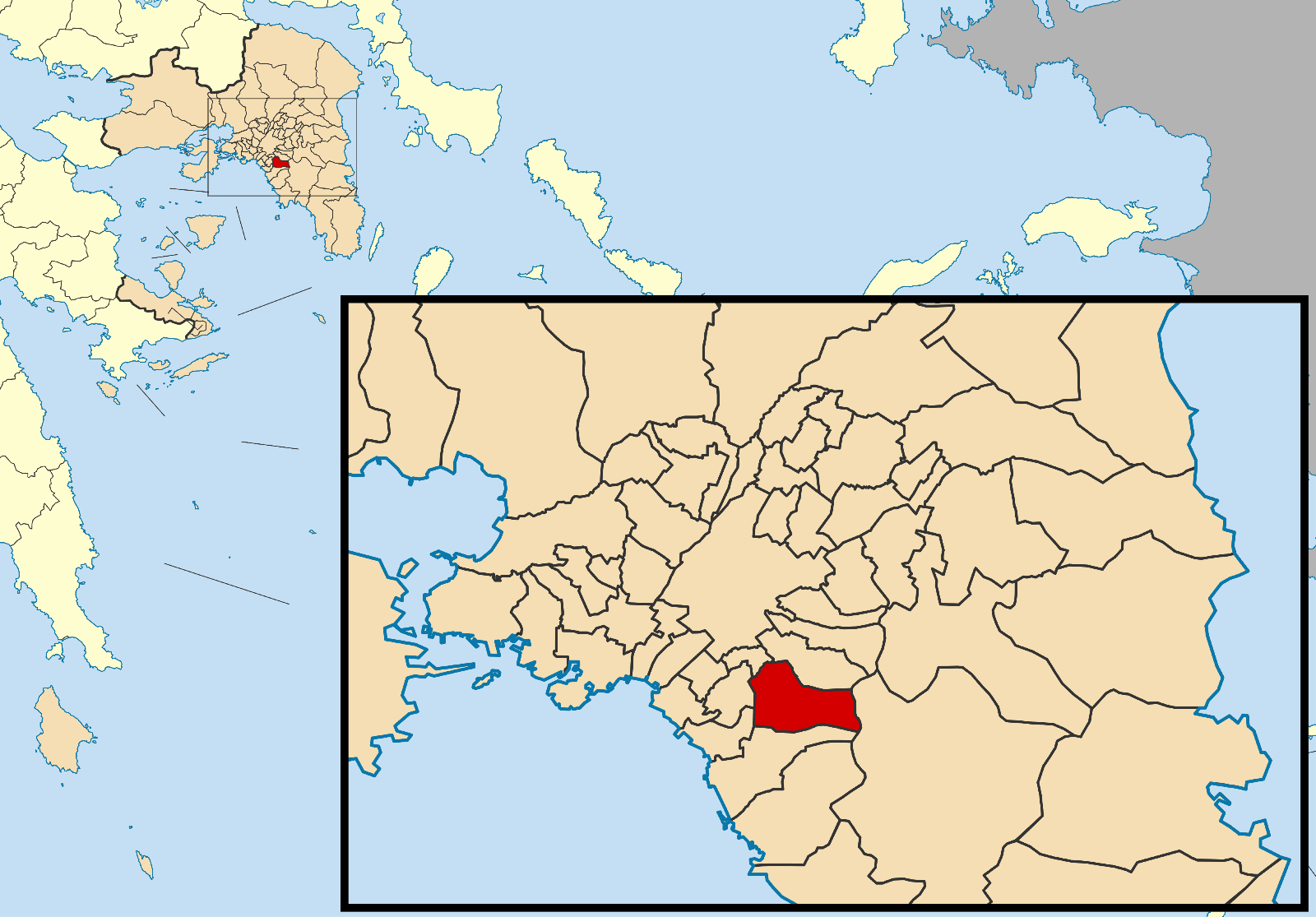

- Location within Greece
- Coordinates: 37°56′N 23°45′E
- Country: Greece
- Administrative region: Attica
- Regional unit: Central Athens

Government
  - Mayor: Efstathios Psyropoulos (since 01-01-2024)

Area
  - Municipality: 12.724 km^{2} (4.913 sq mi)
- Elevation: 150 m (490 ft)

Population (2021)
  - Municipality: 76,730
  - Density: 6,030/km^{2} (15,620/sq mi)
- Time zone: UTC+2 (EET)
  - Summer (DST): UTC+3 (EEST)
- Postal code: 163 xx
- Area code: 210
- Vehicle registration: Z
- Website: ilioupoli.gr

Ilioupoli (Greek: Ηλιούπολη, lit."Sun City") is a suburban municipality and a town in Central Athens regional unit and located in the central-southern part of the Athens agglomeration. Its name is the modern form of the ancient name of Heliopolis in Egypt. Development of Ilioupoli started around 1924, when Greek refugees from Asia Minor settled there.

== Geography ==
Ilioupoli is 6 km (4 mi) southeast of Athens city centre. The municipality has an area of 12.724 km^{2}. It lies at the western foot of the forested Hymettus mountain, which covers the eastern half of the municipality. Its built-up area is continuous with those of neighbouring suburbs Ymittos, Agios Dimitrios, Alimos and Argyroupoli. The main thoroughfares are Vouliagmenis Avenue, which connects Ilioupoli with central Athens, and Venizelou Avenue, which connects with the A62 Hymettus Ring Road (formerly the A64 until 2024). Ilioupoli metro station is served by Line 2 of the Athens Metro. Ilioupoli is also linked by bus to downtown Athens (OASA 237 line) and Glyfada (OASA 140 line).

Ilioupoli is subdivided into 11 quarters: Agia Marina, Agia Mavra, Agia Paraskevi, Agios Konstantinos-Kanaria, Ano Ilioupoli, Astynomika-Panorama, Kato Ilioupoli, Kentro, Nisaki, Typografika and Chalikaki. Ilioupoli has an uncommon street plan, characterised by 5 sets of concentric circular or oval streets.

== Climate ==
Ilioupoli has a hot-summer Mediterranean climate (Köppen climate classification: Csa). Ilioupoli experiences hot, dry summers and mild, wetter winters.

Climate data for Ilioupoli (1971-2000 modelled normals)
Month	Jan	Feb	Mar	Apr	May	Jun	Jul	Aug	Sep	Oct	Nov	Dec	Year
Mean daily maximum °C (°F)	12.48 (54.46)	13.00 (55.40)	15.34 (59.61)	19.89 (67.80)	25.53 (77.95)	32.43 (90.37)	32.15 (89.87)	31.96 (89.53)	28.75 (83.75)	23.23 (73.81)	17.59 (63.66)	13.82 (56.88)	22.08 (71.74)
Daily mean °C (°F)	8.84 (47.91)	9.21 (48.58)	11.19 (52.14)	15.26 (59.47)	20.59 (69.06)	25.72 (78.30)	27.58 (81.64)	27.24 (81.03)	23.60 (74.48)	18.56 (65.41)	13.84 (56.91)	10.75 (51.35)	17.70 (63.86)
Mean daily minimum °C (°F)	5.34 (41.61)	5.47 (41.85)	6.61 (43.90)	9.61 (49.30)	13.86 (56.95)	18.34 (65.01)	21.06 (69.91)	20.87 (69.57)	17.84 (64.11)	13.25 (55.85)	10.34 (50.61)	8.68 (47.62)	12.61 (54.69)
Average precipitation mm (inches)	44.51 (1.75)	43.54 (1.71)	50.20 (1.98)	31.88 (1.26)	18.66 (0.73)	8.26 (0.33)	8.89 (0.35)	10.06 (0.40)	9.66 (0.38)	40.85 (1.61)	60.50 (2.38)	62.75 (2.47)	389.76 (15.34)
Mean monthly sunshine hours	126.28	139.23	175.54	219.10	275.89	328.95	344.30	322.96	261.32	196.50	127.61	100.30	2,605.5
Source: Hellenic National Meteorological Service

== Historical population ==
Year	Population
1981	69,560
1991	75,037
2001	75,904
2011	78,153
2021	76,730

== Landmarks ==
- Anapsiktirio "Demetrios Kintis"
- Plateia Iroon (Iroon Square)
- Koimisi tis Theotokou Church
- Kentriki Plateia (Central Square or Hethnikis Antistaseos Square)
- Plateia Kanaria (Kanaria Square)
- Plateia Flemingk (Fleming Square)
- Chalikaki Athletics Stadium

== Sports ==
Ilioupoli is the seat of the clubs Charavgiakos F.C., club founded in 1949 and Ilioupoli F.C., club founded in 1953.

Sport clubs based in Ilioupoli
Club	Founded	Sports	Achievements
Charavgiakos F.C.	1949	Football, Basketball	Earlier presence in Beta Ethniki, in football
GS Ilioupoli	1953	Football, Basketball, Volleyball, Water Polo, Judo, Athletics and other sports	Earlier presence in Beta Ethniki in football, presence in A1 Ethniki in Women's Volleyball and Men's Water Polo

== International relations ==
- Heliopolis (Cairo), Egypt
- Iași, Romania
- Larnaca, Cyprus
- Novi Sad, Serbia (1994)
