= South Athens (regional unit) =

South Athens Περιφερειακή ενότητα Νοτίου Τομέα Αθηνών
- Regional unit
- Municipalities of South Athens

- South Athens within Greece

- Location within Greece
- Coordinates: 37°54′N 23°44′E
- Country: Greece
- Administrative region: Attica
- Seat: Kallithea

Area
  - Total: 69.4 km^{2} (26.8 sq mi)

Population (2021)
  - Total: 529,455
  - Density: 7,630/km^{2} (19,800/sq mi)
- Time zone: UTC+2 (EET)
  - Summer (DST): UTC+3 (EEST)
- Area code: 210

South Athens (Greek: Νότιος Τομέας Αθηνών) is one of the regional units of Greece. It is part of the region of Attica. The regional unit covers the south-central part of the Athens agglomeration.

== Administration ==
As a part of the 2011 Kallikratis government reform, the regional unit South Athens was created out of part of the former Athens Prefecture. It is subdivided into 8 municipalities. These are (number as in the map in the infobox):

- Agios Dimitrios (2)
- Alimos (3)
- Elliniko-Argyroupoli (4)
- Glyfada (5)
- Kallithea (1)
- Moschato-Tavros (6)
- Nea Smyrni (7)
- Palaio Faliro (8)

== See also ==
- List of settlements in Attica
