= Agios Dimitrios =

Aghios Dimitrios Άγιος Δημήτριος
- Municipality
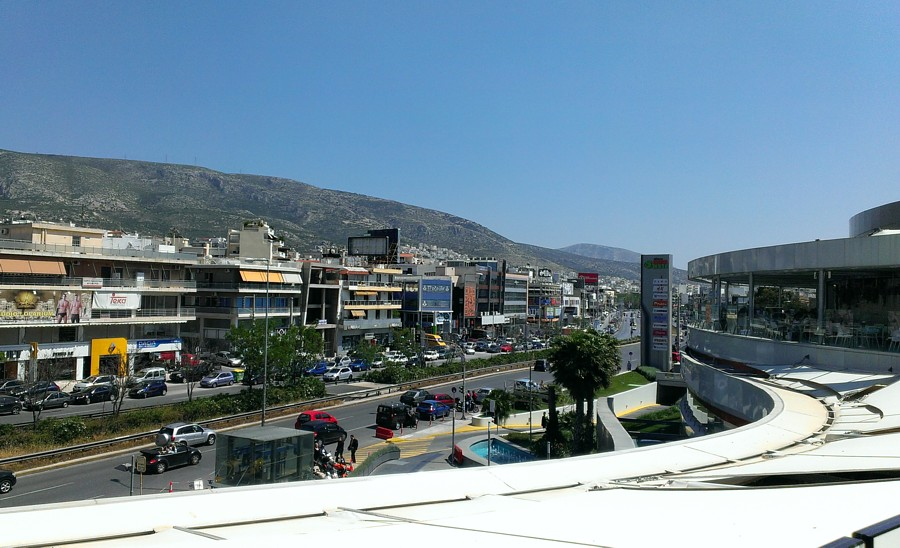

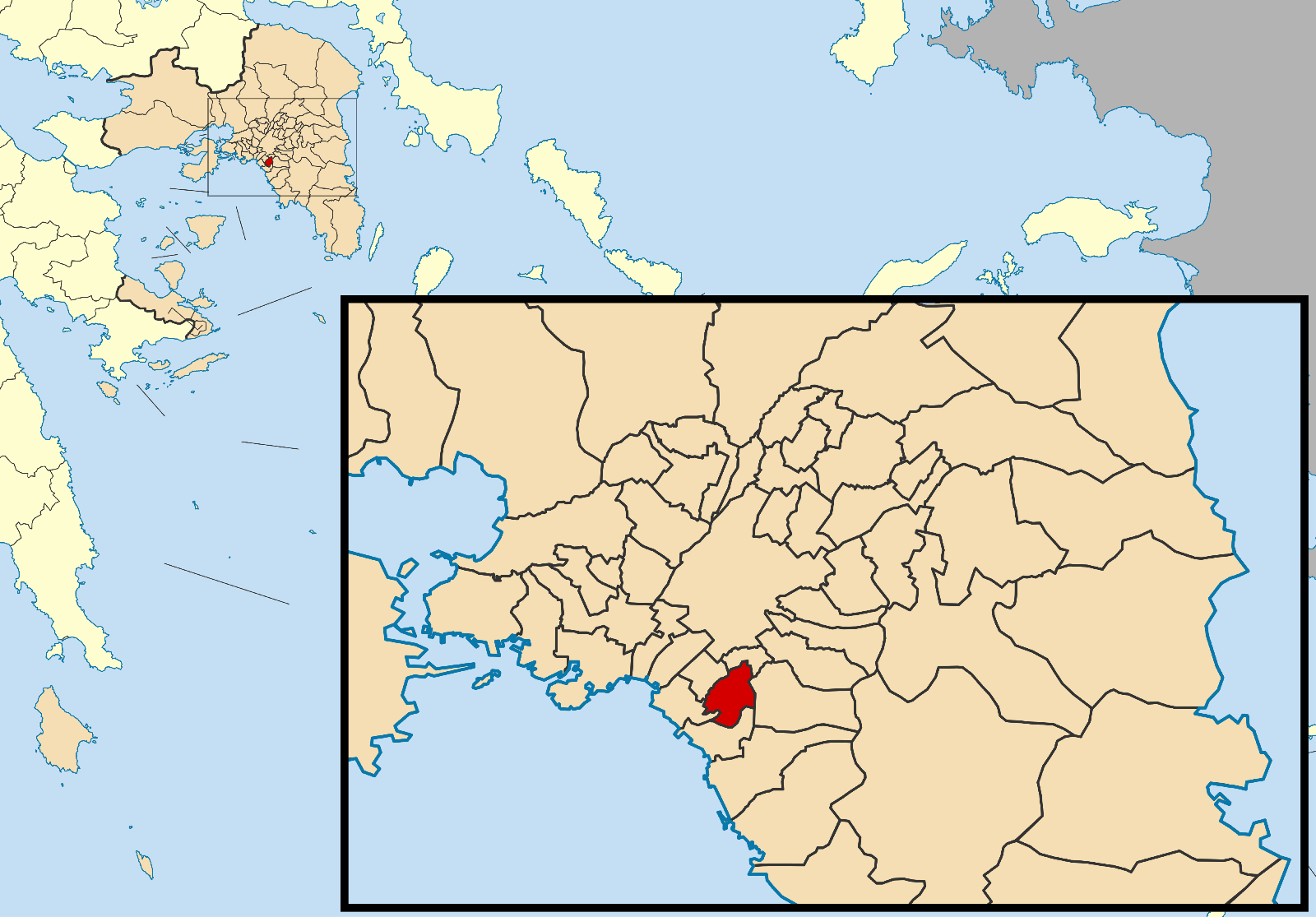

- Location within Greece
- Coordinates: 37°56′N 23°44′E
- Country: Greece
- Administrative region: Attica
- Regional unit: South Athens

Government
  - Mayor: Stelios Mamalakis (since 2023)

Area
  - Municipality: 4.949 km^{2} (1.911 sq mi)
- Elevation: 60 m (200 ft)

Population (2021)
  - Municipality: 71,664
  - Density: 14,480/km^{2} (37,500/sq mi)
- Time zone: UTC+2 (EET)
  - Summer (DST): UTC+3 (EEST)
- Postal code: 173 xx, 17236
- Area code: 210
- Vehicle registration: Z
- Website: www.dad.gr

Agios Dimitrios (Greek: Άγιος Δημήτριος meaning Saint Dimitrios, before 1928: Μπραχάμι - Brahami) is a town in Attica, Greece, and a suburb in the southern part of the Athens agglomeration.

== Geography ==
Agios Dimitrios is situated 5 km south of Athens city centre, and 4 km from the Saronic Gulf coast. The municipality has an area of 4.949 km^{2}. Vouliagmenis Avenue connects it with central Athens and the southern suburbs. The suburb is connected with Line 2 of the Athens Metro through Agios Dimitrios metro station.

== Climate ==
Agios Dimitrios has a hot-summer Mediterranean climate (Köppen climate classification: Csa), bordering on a hot semi-arid climate (Köppen climate classification: BSh). Agios Dimitrios experiences hot, dry summers and mild, wetter winters.

Climate data for Agios Dimitrios
Month	Jan	Feb	Mar	Apr	May	Jun	Jul	Aug	Sep	Oct	Nov	Dec	Year
Mean daily maximum °C (°F)	12.93 (55.27)	13.20 (55.76)	15.43 (59.77)	19.79 (67.62)	25.38 (77.68)	30.50 (86.90)	32.40 (90.32)	32.12 (89.82)	28.77 (83.79)	23.41 (74.14)	18.02 (64.44)	14.41 (57.94)	22.20 (71.95)
Daily mean °C (°F)	9.24 (48.63)	9.48 (49.06)	11.50 (52.70)	15.61 (60.10)	20.74 (69.33)	25.73 (78.31)	27.87 (82.17)	27.44 (81.39)	24.08 (75.34)	19.00 (66.20)	14.42 (57.96)	11.36 (52.45)	18.04 (64.47)
Mean daily minimum °C (°F)	6.28 (43.30)	6.39 (43.50)	7.55 (45.59)	10.58 (51.04)	14.69 (58.44)	19.11 (66.40)	21.82 (71.28)	21.80 (71.24)	18.81 (65.86)	14.56 (58.21)	11.12 (52.02)	8.06 (46.51)	13.40 (56.12)
Average precipitation mm (inches)	43.77 (1.72)	42.84 (1.69)	46.23 (1.82)	28.84 (1.14)	17.13 (0.67)	7.24 (0.29)	7.58 (0.30)	9.17 (0.36)	8.53 (0.34)	38.18 (1.50)	55.14 (2.17)	62.16 (2.45)	366.81 (14.45)
Mean monthly sunshine hours	126.03	138.21	180.03	229.51	280.37	331.73	346.94	327.87	262.84	199.53	133.16	103.93	2,660.15
Source: Hellenic National Meteorological Service

== History ==
The settlement developed around the church of Saint Dimitrios was the original web of the village of Brahami during the interwar period.

In the Turkish occupation, but also after the liberation, all Alimos, and not only, was a vast estate. The beginning was at St. John at Kareas and extended to Kavouri. The area, including the agricultural village, belonged to Braham Pasha - by which Agios Dimitrios is also called Brahami - and to Hassan Pasha, from which came the name Hassani. All this property was divided into parcels, which the municipality of Athens, to which it belonged, donated or sold. This resulted in the creation of various settlements.

The Community of Brahami was founded in 1925. Until then the village of Brahami belonged to the municipality of Athens. By Decree of 1925, Brahami was administered autonomously by the Athenian municipality and was a community comprising the settlements of Brahami, Agia Varvara, Katsipodi (Dafni today), Pikrodafni and Agios Kosmas. In 1928 the community was renamed Agios Dimitrios. It was converted into a municipality of Agios Dimitrios, which was based in Daphne in 1942.

In 1947, with the Decree issued on September 5, 1947, the settlement of Agios Dimitrios was seized by the Municipality of Dafni and formed into a separate homonymous community, which included exclusively Brahami. The final adjustment was made in 1963, when the then Home Secretary G. Rallis on 15 March approved the conversion of the Community of Agios Dimitrios into a homonymous municipality, as it is today.

== Historical population ==
Year	Population
1981	51,421
1991	57,574
2001	65,173
2011	71,294
2021	71,664

== Sports ==
The most important clubs based in Agios Dimitrios is the football club Agios Dimitrios F.C., Thyella Agiou Dimitriou and the basketball club Cronus Agios Dimitrios.

Sport clubs based in Aghios Dimitrios
Club	Founded	Sports	Achievements
Agios Dimitrios F.C.	1928	Football	Presence in Athens B local
Cronus Agios Dimitrios	1976	Basketball	Earlier presence in A1 Ethniki women
Thyella Agiou Dimitriou	1966	Football	Presence in Athens A local

== Twinnings ==
- Pozzuoli, a suburb of Naples in Campania, Italy
