= Elliniko-Argyroupoli =

Municipality in South Athens, Greece

Elliniko-Argyroupoli Ελληνικό-Αργυρούπολη
- Municipality
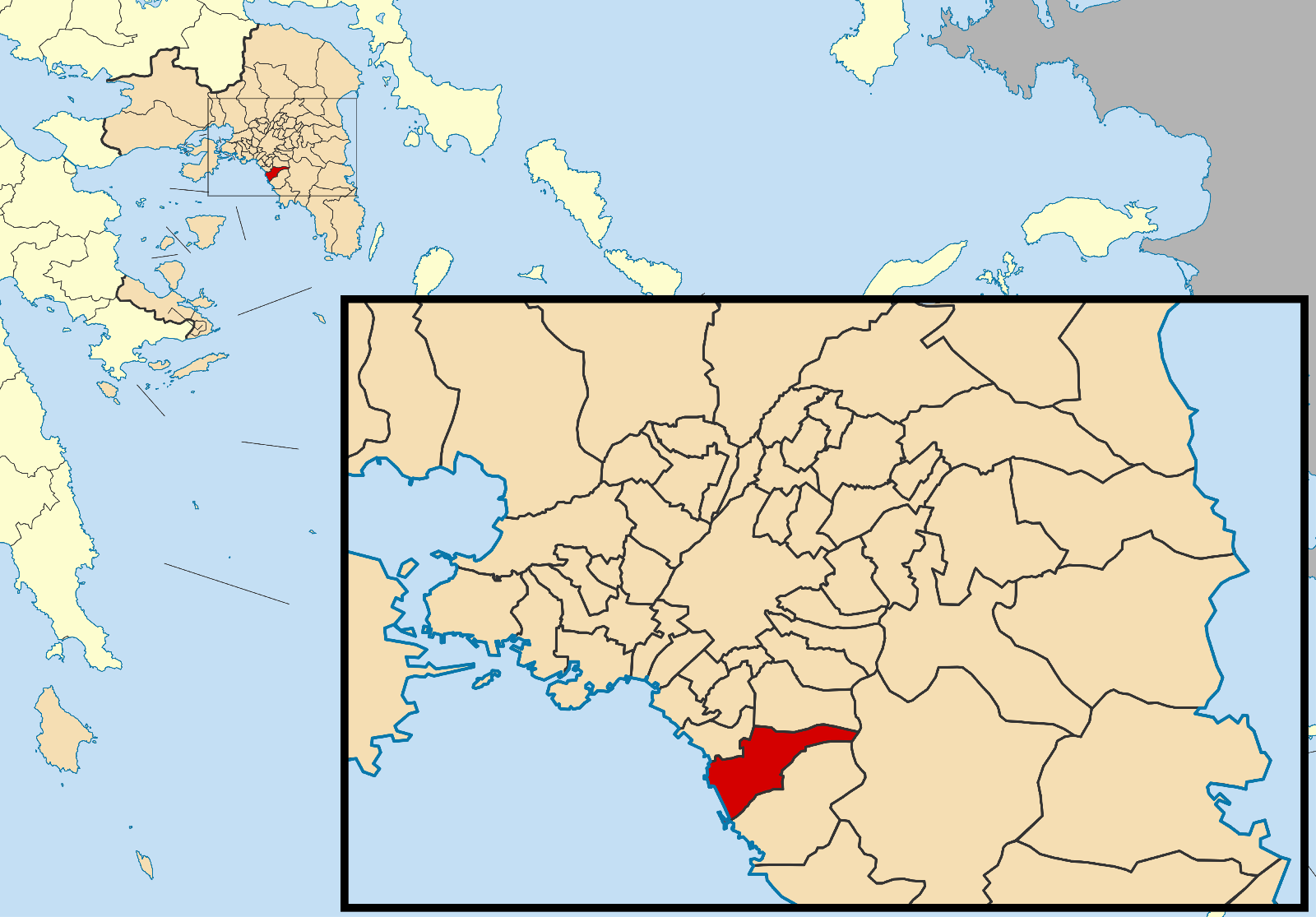

- Location within Greece
- Coordinates: 37°54′N 23°45′E
- Country: Greece
- Administrative region: Attica
- Regional unit: South Athens
- Seat: Argyroupoli

Area
  - Municipality: 15.355 km^{2} (5.929 sq mi)

Population (2021)
  - Municipality: 50,027
  - Density: 3,258.0/km^{2} (8,438.3/sq mi)
- Time zone: UTC+2 (EET)
  - Summer (DST): UTC+3 (EEST)
- Website: elliniko-argyroupoli.gr

Elliniko-Argyroupoli (Greek: Ελληνικό-Αργυρούπολη) is a municipality in the South Athens regional unit, Attica, Greece. The seat of the municipality is the town Argyroupoli. The municipality has an area of 15.355 km^{2}.

== Municipality ==
The municipality Elliniko–Argyroupoli was formed at the 2011 local government reform by the merger of the following 2 former municipalities, that became municipal units:

- Argyroupoli
- Elliniko
