= Alimos =

Alimos Άλιμος
- Municipality
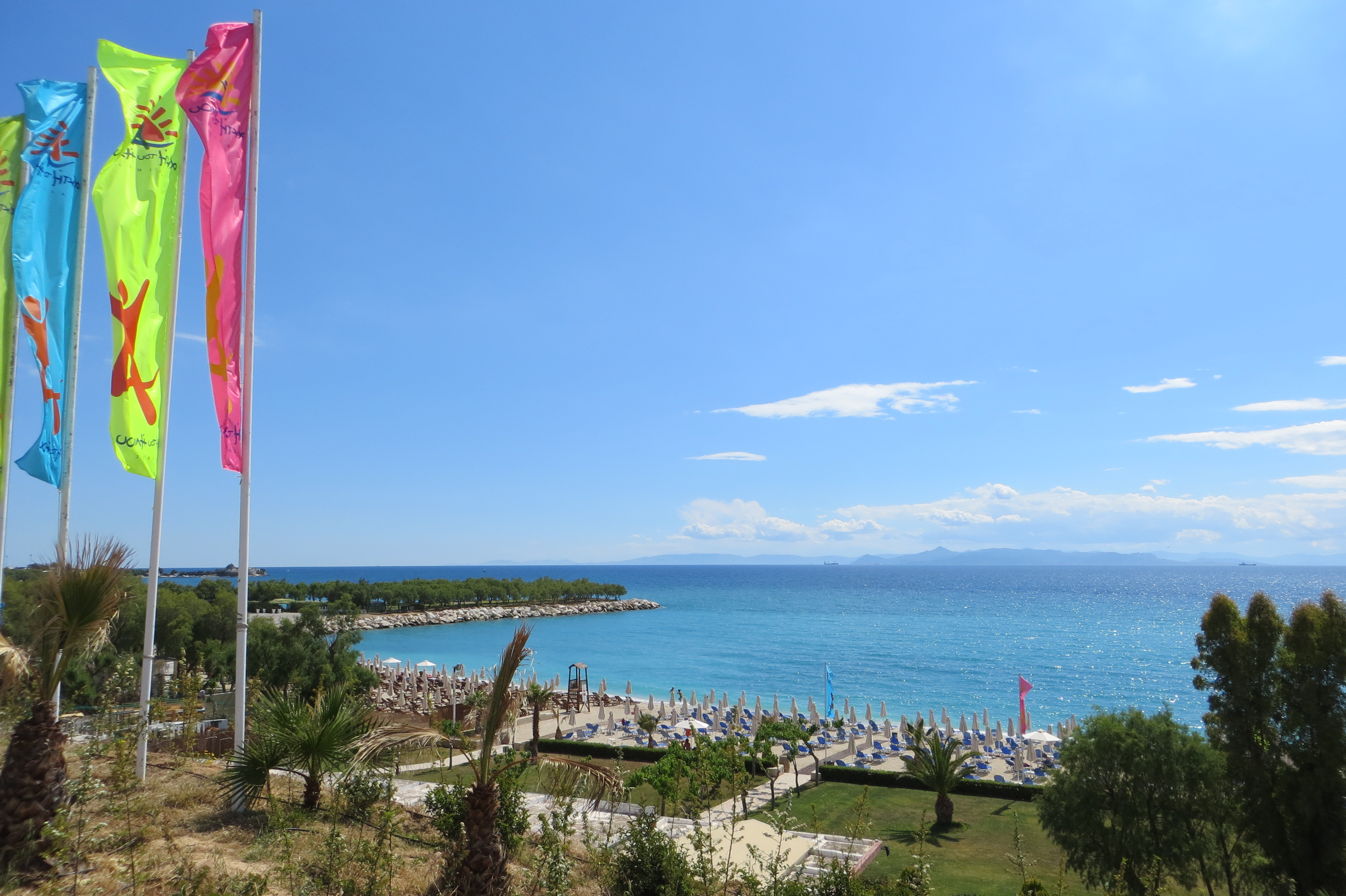
- Alimos

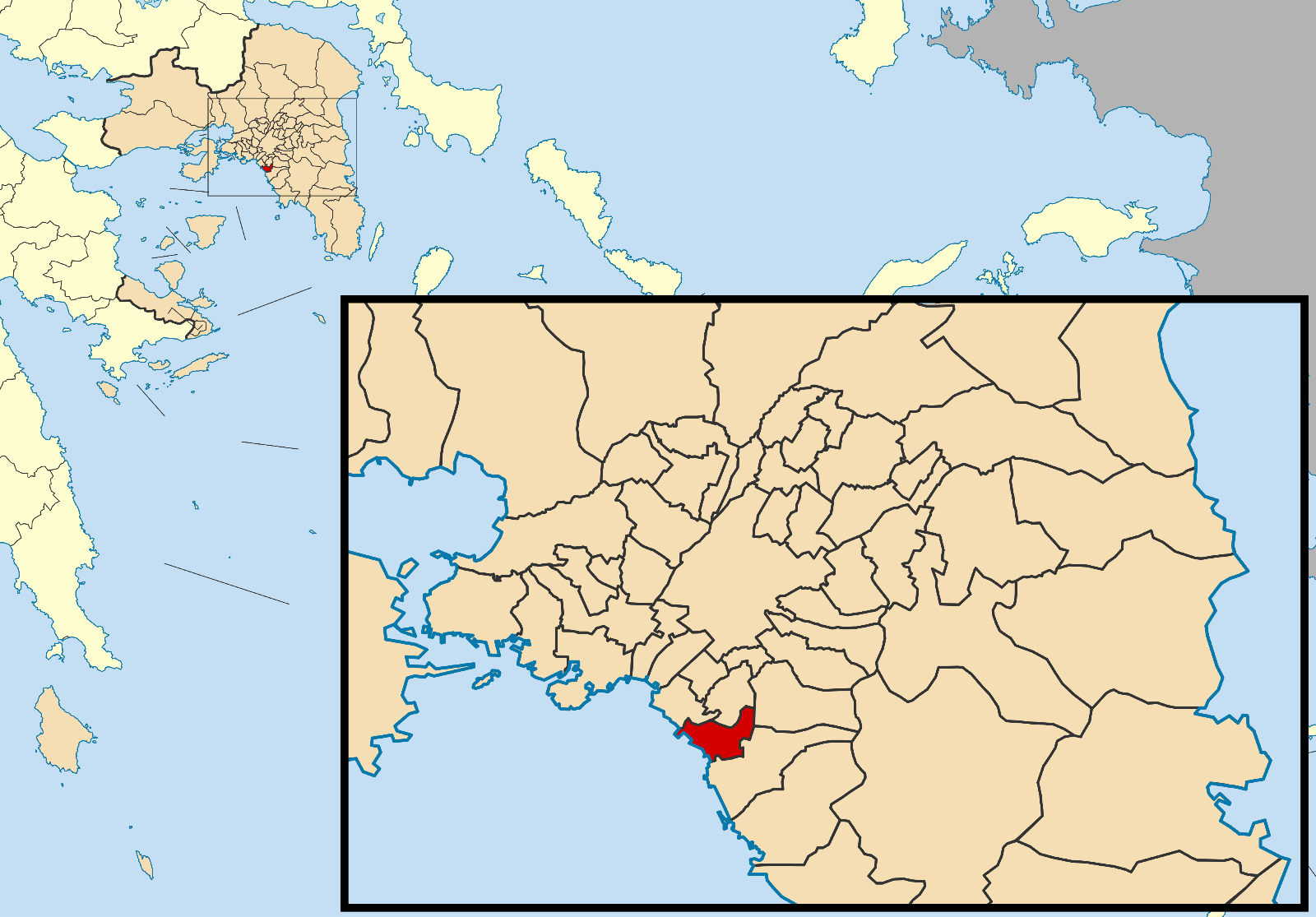

- Location within Greece
- Coordinates: 37°55′N 23°43′E
- Country: Greece
- Administrative region: Attica
- Regional unit: South Athens

Government
  - Mayor: Andreas Kondylis (since 2014)

Area
  - Municipality: 5.909 km^{2} (2.281 sq mi)
- Elevation: 10 m (33 ft)

Population (2021)
  - Municipality: 43,174
  - Density: 7,306/km^{2} (18,920/sq mi)
- Time zone: UTC+2 (EET)
  - Summer (DST): UTC+3 (EEST)
- Postal code: 174 xx
- Area code: 210
- Vehicle registration: Z
- Website: www.alimos.gov.gr

Alimos (Greek: Άλιμος) is a town on the Saronic Gulf coast, a suburb of the Athens agglomeration, and a municipality in South Athens regional unit, Greece. It was formed in 1968 comprising two settlements, the suburban seaside town of Kalamaki (Greek: Καλαμάκι), and the inland community of Trachones (Greek: Τράχωνες). Alimos had 43,174 inhabitants in the 2021 census.

== History ==
The first settlements uncovered by archaeologists in Alimos date back to the Neolithic period, and the excavation site can be found in the region of Euonymeia (Ano Kalamaki), immediately by the Vouliagmenis Avenue.

In classical antiquity, Halimous (Ancient Greek: Ἁλιμοῦς; also Alimous, Ἀλιμοῦς) was a fishing town on the outskirts of the city-state of Athens and constituted one of the demes of Attica. The area of Ano Kalamaki, known as Euonymeia, constituted a distinct settlement, which in classical antiquity became the urban (asty) Deme of Euonymos. Testament to its development during this period are the ruins of the amphitheatre of Euonymos, quite unusual in the ancient world in its rectangular design. The site can be found on Archaiou Theatrou Street in Ano Kalamaki (just a few blocks away from the Neolithic site).

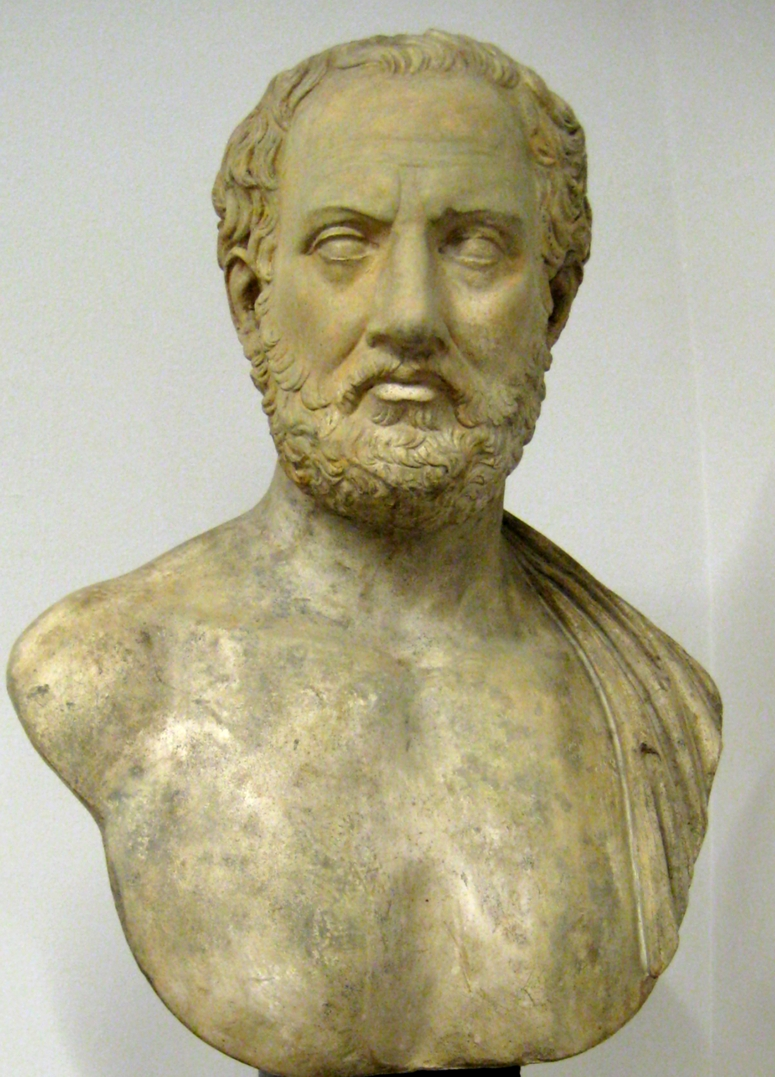
The historian Thucydides (Θουκυδίδης Ολόρου Αλιμούσιος) came from the deme of Alimos.

The most significant historical affiliation of Alimos is that with Thucydides. Thucydides was born in Halimous, and is often referred to as "Thucydides the Halimousian" (Greek: Θουκυδίδης ο Αλιμούσιος). The bust of Thucydides is the emblem of Alimos, which is commonly used between schools in the area. Furthermore, the First High School of Alimos is called Thoukydideio (Greek: Θουκυδίδειο), after him.

Kalamaki was part of the community of Brachami until 1927, when it became a separate community. The community Kalamaki was abolished in 1968, when the municipality Alimos was founded.

== Culture ==
=== Education ===
Alimos has public and private schools of grades, apart from higher education, in several places throughout the city. The city has 12 public kindergartens, 8 public elementary schools, 6 public Junior High Schools (including a Music School) and 5 High Schools (including one Technical High School). Furthermore, there are several private schools, where tuition fees are needed.

== Geography ==
Alimos is situated on the Saronic Gulf coast, 8 km south of Athens city centre along the Athens coast. The municipality has an area of 5,909 km^{2}. The Hellinikon Olympic Complex, built on the grounds of the former Ellinikon International Airport for the 2004 Summer Olympics, lies south of Alimos. The built-up area of Alimos is continuous with those of the neighbouring suburbs Palaio Faliro, Agios Dimitrios, Ilioupoli, Argyroupoli and Elliniko. Alimos has a large marina and several beaches.

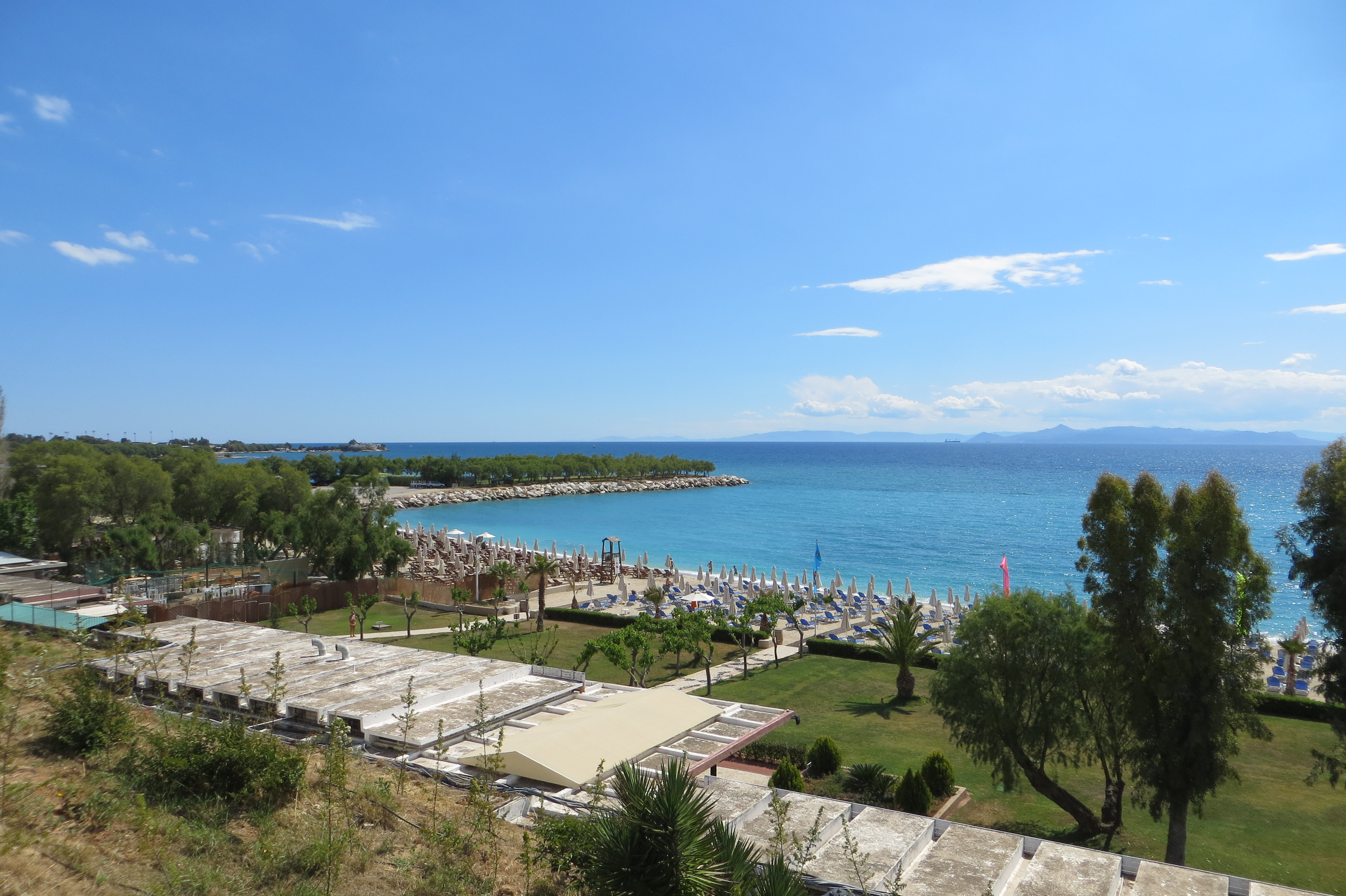
One of the beaches of Alimos.

The main roads of Alimos are Poseidonos Avenue along the coast, Kalamakiou Avenue and Alimou Avenue. The nearest subway station is at Alimos metro station, in the eastern part of the municipality. The western, coastal part of the municipality is connected with downtown Athens by the Tram.

=== Climate ===
Alimos has a hot-summer Mediterranean climate (Köppen climate classification: Csa), bordering on a hot semi-arid climate (Köppen climate classification: BSh). Alimos experiences hot, dry summers and mild, wetter winters.

Climate data for Alimos (1971-2000 modeled normals)
Month	Jan	Feb	Mar	Apr	May	Jun	Jul	Aug	Sep	Oct	Nov	Dec	Year
Mean daily maximum °C (°F)	13.18 (55.72)	13.48 (56.26)	15.56 (60.01)	19.66 (67.39)	25.01 (77.02)	29.99 (85.98)	32.16 (89.89)	31.96 (89.53)	28.53 (83.35)	23.38 (74.08)	18.25 (64.85)	14.77 (58.59)	22.16 (71.89)
Daily mean °C (°F)	9.80 (49.64)	9.99 (49.98)	11.89 (53.40)	15.79 (60.42)	20.70 (69.26)	25.53 (77.95)	27.89 (82.20)	27.56 (81.61)	24.32 (75.78)	19.33 (66.79)	14.88 (58.78)	11.82 (53.28)	18.29 (64.92)
Mean daily minimum °C (°F)	7.00 (44.60)	7.09 (44.76)	8.24 (46.83)	11.25 (52.25)	15.31 (59.56)	19.67 (67.41)	22.38 (72.28)	22.48 (72.46)	19.59 (67.26)	15.54 (59.97)	11.76 (53.17)	8.68 (47.62)	14.08 (57.35)
Average precipitation mm (inches)	43.34 (1.71)	42.43 (1.67)	45.58 (1.79)	26.82 (1.06)	15.13 (0.60)	6.11 (0.24)	6.78 (0.27)	8.33 (0.33)	7.54 (0.30)	36.35 (1.43)	52.46 (2.07)	61.43 (2.42)	352.3 (13.89)
Mean monthly sunshine hours	125.63	139.90	181.96	230.08	282.18	334.34	350.68	333.10	263.88	200.54	135.13	106.91	2,684.33
Source: Hellenic National Meteorological Service

=== Current Weather (2021-) ===
Weather records for 2021- in Alimos (as of 1st November, 2026) are given below:

Climate data for Alimos (2021- normals as of 1st November, 2026, elevation: 25m asl)
Month	Jan	Feb	Mar	Apr	May	Jun	Jul	Aug	Sep	Oct	Nov	Dec	Year
Record high °C (°F)	20.9 (69.6)	20.9 (69.6)	23.2 (73.8)	28.3 (82.9)	33.7 (92.7)	39.3 (102.7)	40.9 (105.6)	42.5 (108.5)	36.7 (98.1)	30.9 (87.6)	26.1 (79.0)	21.1 (70.0)	42.5 (108.5)
Mean daily maximum °C (°F)	14.8 (58.6)	15.1 (59.2)	16.6 (61.9)	20.2 (68.4)	24.3 (75.7)	30.8 (87.4)	34.1 (93.4)	33.3 (91.9)	28.9 (84.0)	23.6 (74.5)	20.4 (68.7)	16.7 (62.1)	23.2 (73.8)
Daily mean °C (°F)	12.0 (53.6)	12.1 (53.8)	13.3 (55.9)	16.9 (62.4)	20.7 (69.3)	27.0 (80.6)	30.1 (86.2)	29.4 (84.9)	25.2 (77.4)	20.2 (68.4)	17.3 (63.1)	13.8 (56.8)	19.8 (67.6)
Mean daily minimum °C (°F)	9.3 (48.7)	9.3 (48.7)	10.2 (50.4)	13.9 (57.0)	17.6 (63.7)	23.3 (73.9)	26.5 (79.7)	26.2 (79.2)	22.0 (71.6)	17.2 (63.0)	14.5 (58.1)	10.1 (50.2)	16.7 (62.1)
Record low °C (°F)	−0.1 (31.8)	−0.7 (30.7)	1.1 (34.0)	7.2 (45.0)	8.1 (46.6)	15.7 (60.3)	18.5 (65.3)	20.3 (68.5)	14.7 (58.5)	10.5 (50.9)	6.9 (44.4)	4.1 (39.4)	−0.7 (30.7)
Average precipitation mm (inches)	60.3 (2.37)	30.6 (1.20)	15.1 (0.59)	18.9 (0.74)	7.7 (0.30)	9.0 (0.35)	3.2 (0.13)	3.4 (0.13)	25.6 (1.01)	55.4 (2.18)	46.9 (1.85)	79.5 (3.13)	306.7 (12.07)
Source: National Observatory of Athens

=== Sports ===
Alimos has two clubs with presence in panhellenic championships, the water polo club N.O. Kalamaki with presence in A1 Ethniki and the football club Trachones F.C. with presence in Gamma Ethniki. In Alimos is located the Byzantine Sport Centre that is used by the two sport clubs come from Constantinople, A.O. Tataula and A.S. Pera. These clubs settled in Alimos in 1973 and have many honours in Greek Table Tennis Championship.

Sport clubs based in Alimos
Club	Founded	Sports	Achievements
N.O. Kalamaki	1947	Water Polo	presence in A1 Ethniki water polo
Trachones F.C.	1957	Football	Presence in Beta Ethniki
A.L.F.A. B.C.	1985	Basketball	presence in A2
A.O. Kalamaki	1948	Football	
Niki Alimou	1926	Football	
Enosi Trachonon - Dia Alimou	2004	Basketball	

== Commercial activity ==
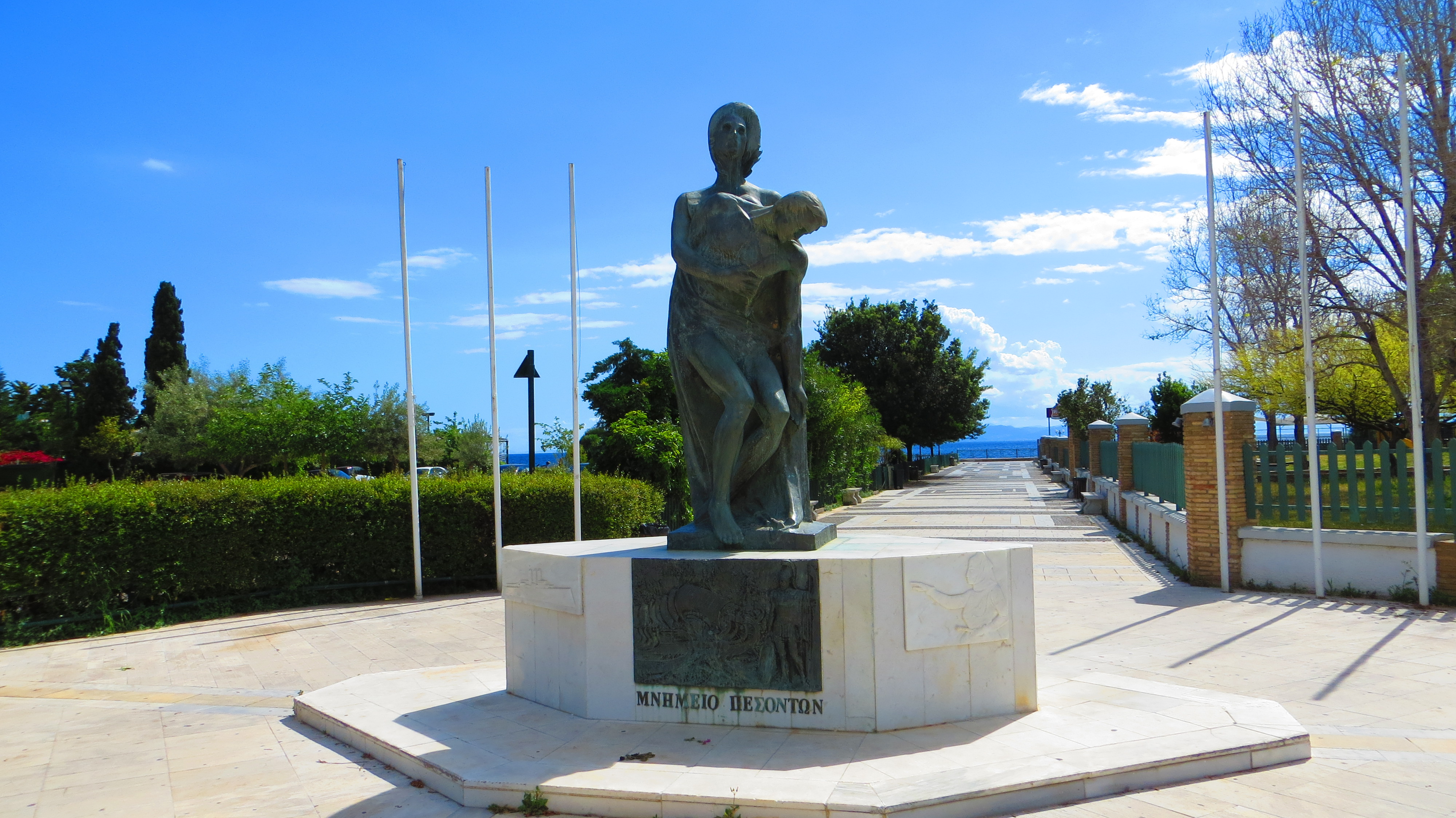
Monument on the coast of the city.

The commercial activity in Kalamaki or Alimos is concentrated in the major avenues that cross the city regional (Amfitheas-Poseidonos-Alimou) and the streets that are inside the city links (Thukididou-Kalamakiou-Theomitoros-Ionias-Dodekanisou).

== Historical population ==
Year	Population
1981	27,036
1991	32,024
2001	38,047
2011	41,720
2021	43,174

Many people here are the descendants of refugees from Kalkan Turkey, arriving in the Greek genocide

== International relations ==
Alimos is twinned with:

- Niš, Serbia
