= Vouliagmenis Avenue =

Avenue in Athens, Greece

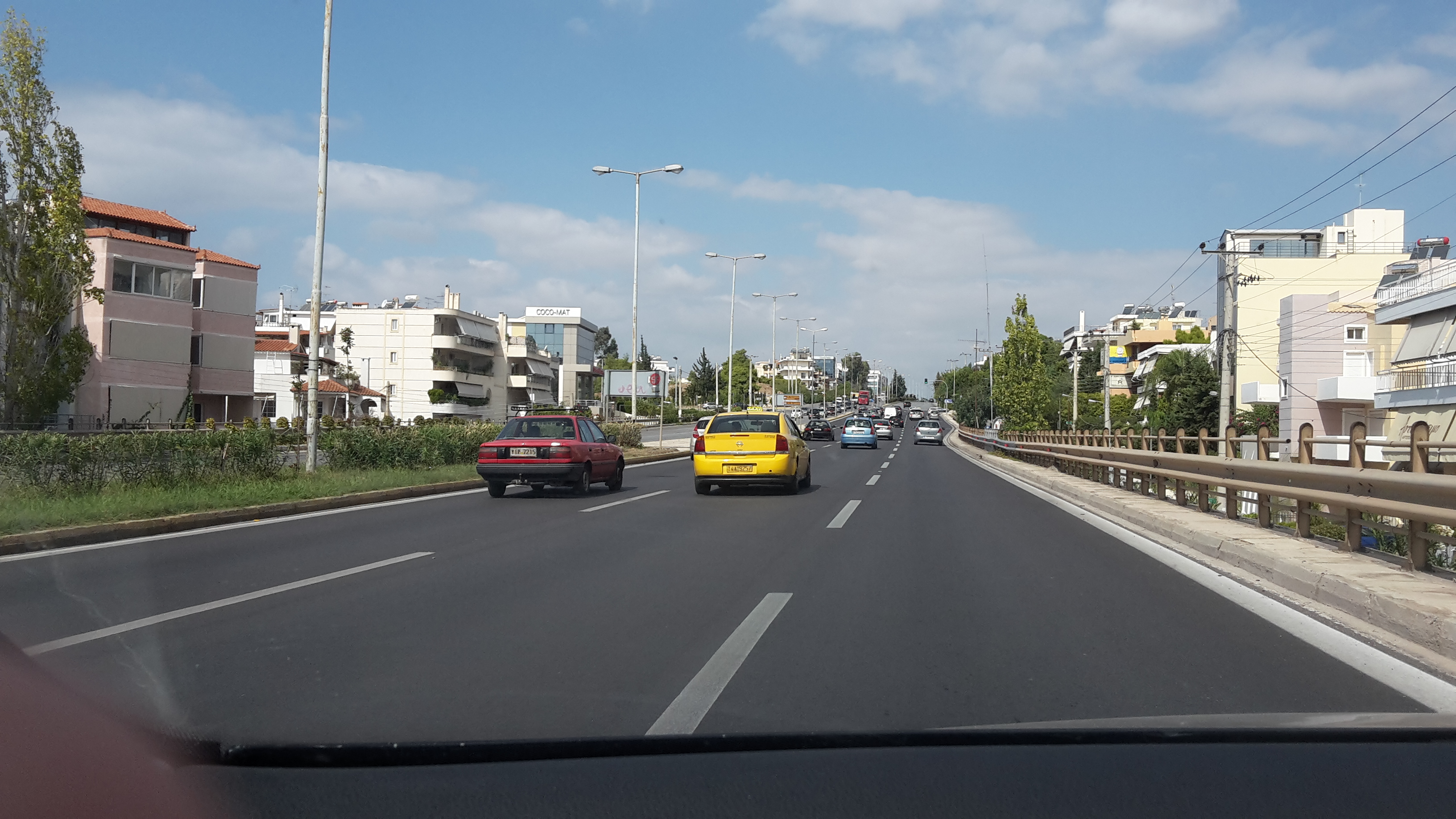
Vouliagmenis Avenue, Athens, Greece

Vouliagmenis Avenue (Greek: Λεωφόρος Βουλιαγμένης, romanized: Leofóros Vouliagménis) is one of the longest avenues in the Greater Athens area, stretching from central Athens to the seaside resort of Vouliagmeni.https://www.athens24.com/guide/vouliagmenis-avenue.html The total length is 21 km. The avenue begins at Athanasios Diakos Street and Michalakopoulou Street and the southbound portion of the avenue runs with three lanes to the southern portion of municipality of Athens and eastern Dafni. Seven Athens Metro subway stations lie underneath or next to the avenue: Agios Ioannis, Dafni, Agios Dimitrios, Ilioupoli station, Alimos station, Argyroupoli station and Elliniko station, all part of the southern section of the Red Line. It has an intersection with the road linking with the Hymettus Ring of the Attiki Odos motorway and Katechaki Avenue. It also has several intersections in Glyfada and with the Vari-Koropi Avenue.

== Athanasiou Diakou Street ==
Athanasiou Diakou Street (Greek: Οδός Αθανάσιου Διάκου, Odos Athanasiou Diakou), named after the Greek War of Independence hero Athanasios Diakos, is a short but wide central street in Athens linking Vasilissis Amalias Avenue and Andrea Syngrou Avenue, it is a small branch linking with Vouliagmenis Avenue where it ends along with Kallirois and Arditou Streets which links with Vasileos Konstantinou Avenue. It also contains a small intersection with Iosif Rogou Street which is used for local traffic. Its total length is only nearly 200 m. Residential buildings lie on the southwest side and forests lie to the northeast side.

== National and provincial road designation ==
Vouliagmenis Avenue carries an unnumbered national road between Athens and Voula, with both ends connecting with the EO91: the national road is numbered the EO80 for statistical purposes by National Statistical Service of Greece (ESYE), reusing the number allocated in July 1963 for an airport road to Triodos Airport. The avenue also carries Attica Provincial Road 13, between Athens and Glyfada.

Attica Provincial Road 13 was created by a Royal Decree of 6 February 1956: Ministerial Decision DMEO/e/O/1308 of 15 December 1995 then upgraded the southern half of the avenue (from Argyroupoli to Voula) a national road, with the Register of National Roads (1998) doing the same to the other half.

== Places ==
- southern Athens (Municipality)
- eastern Dafni
- Agios Dimitrios
- near Ilioupoli
- eastern Alimos
- Elliniko
- Glyfada
- Voula
- Vouliagmeni

== Attractions ==
- Nana Cinemax
- Athens Metro Mall

== Major intersections ==
- Alimos Avenue
