= Elliniko metro station =

Metro station in Athens, Greece

Ελληνικό Elliniko
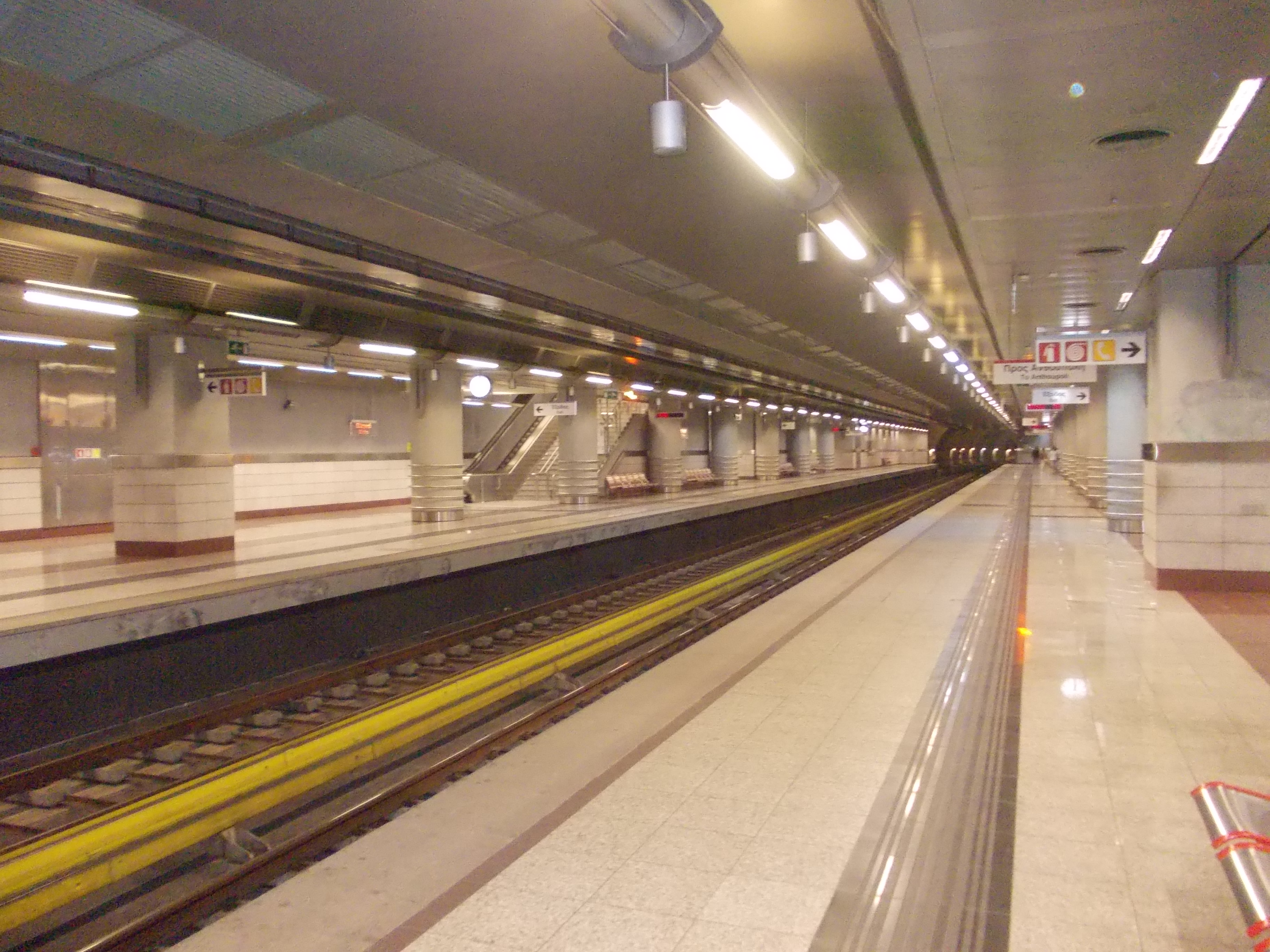
- Station platforms

General information
- Other names: Helliniko
- Location: 167 77 Elliniko; Greece
- Coordinates: 37°53′33.25″N 23°44′49.75″E
- Manager: STASY
- Line: Athens Metro Line 2
- Platforms: 2
- Tracks: 2

Construction
- Structure type: Underground
- Accessible: Yes

Key dates
- 26 July 2013: Opened

Services
Preceding station	Athens Metro	Following station
Argyroupoli towards Anthoupoli	Line 2	Terminus
Location

Elliniko (Greek: Ελληνικό) is the current southern terminus on Athens Metro Line 2 since the Elliniko extension opened on 26 July 2013. With the opening of the station, travel time from Elliniko to Syntagma Square was reduced from 45 minutes (by car) to 20 minutes.

== Location ==
The station is adjacent to Vouliagmenis Avenue, at its section north of the closed Ellinikon International Airport which is being transformed into Hellinikon Metropolitan Park. It has two exits to the ground level, one on each side of Vouliagmenis Avenue, with the southern exit to have a metallic oval shaped roof, as well as a square.

== Construction ==
Construction works of the station started in 2007. While initially being planned to be delivered by 2009, and later 2010, it was finally inaugurated in July 2013, after three and a half years of delays, because of the Siemens Greek bribery scandal.

== Bus connections ==
Several bus lines of OSY operate from the station, so as to provide connections with Athens International Airport and several southern suburbs of Athens.

- 171 & 122Θ Argyroupoli metro station - Varkiza (122Θ οperates between June and July)
- 122 Argyroupoli metro station - Saronida
- A3 Academy - Glyfada via Vouliagmenis Avenue
- X97 Elliniko metro station - Athens International Airport
- 790 Glyfada - Peristeri (operating from 00:30 to 04:30)
- 124 Glyfada - Agia Triada - Argyroupoli metro station
- 154 Panorama Voulas - Ano Glyfada - Argyroupoli metro station
- 205 Glyfada - Sourmena - Terpsithea

== Station layout ==
G Ground	-	Exits
C Concourse	Concourse	Customer Service, Tickets
P Platforms	Side platform, doors will open on the right
P Platforms	Platform 1	← towards Anthoupoli (Argyroupoli)
P Platforms	Platform 2	→ For use by inbound trains
P Platforms	Side platform, doors will open on the right

== Gallery ==
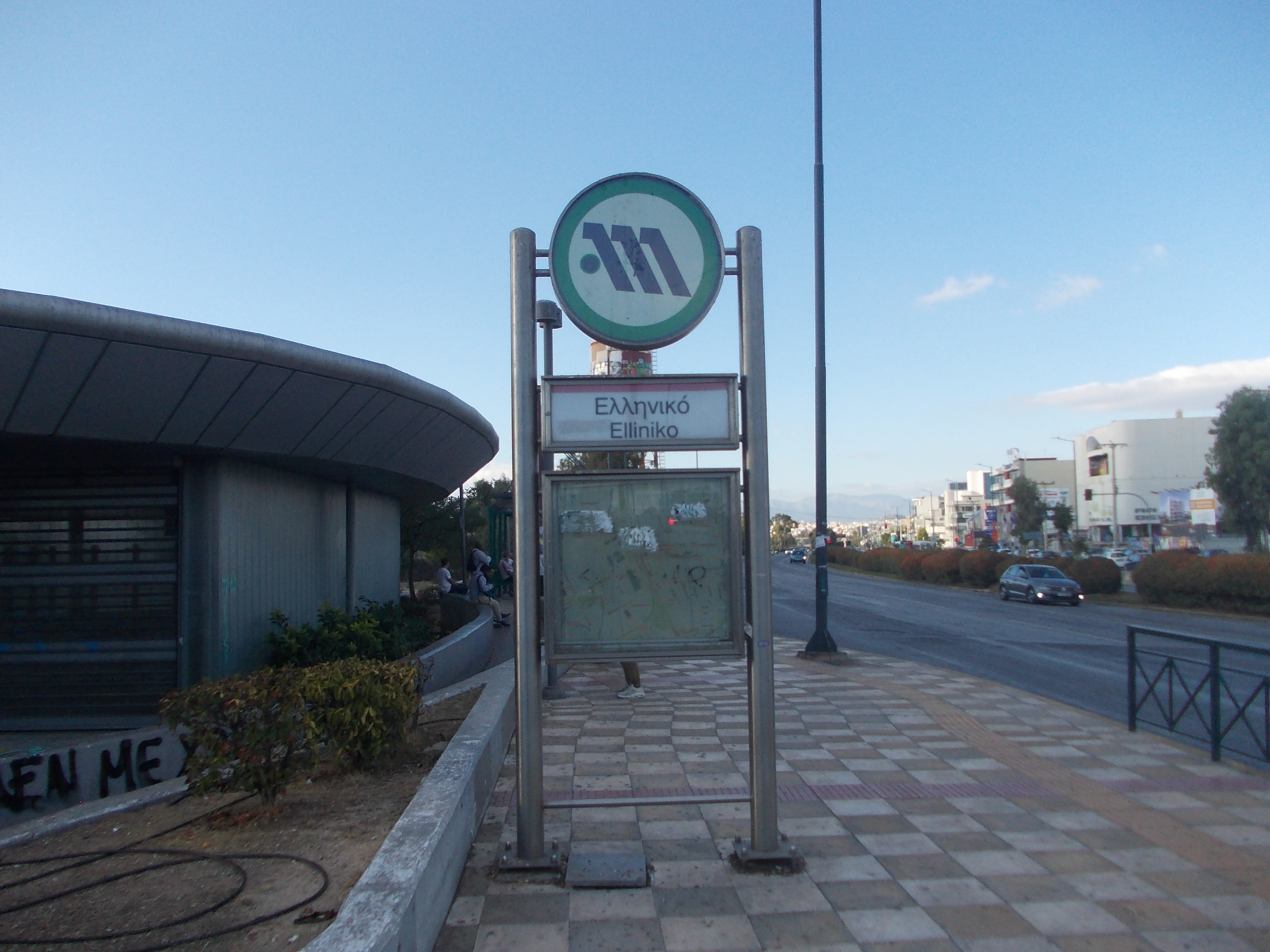
Sign on Vouliagmenis Avenue

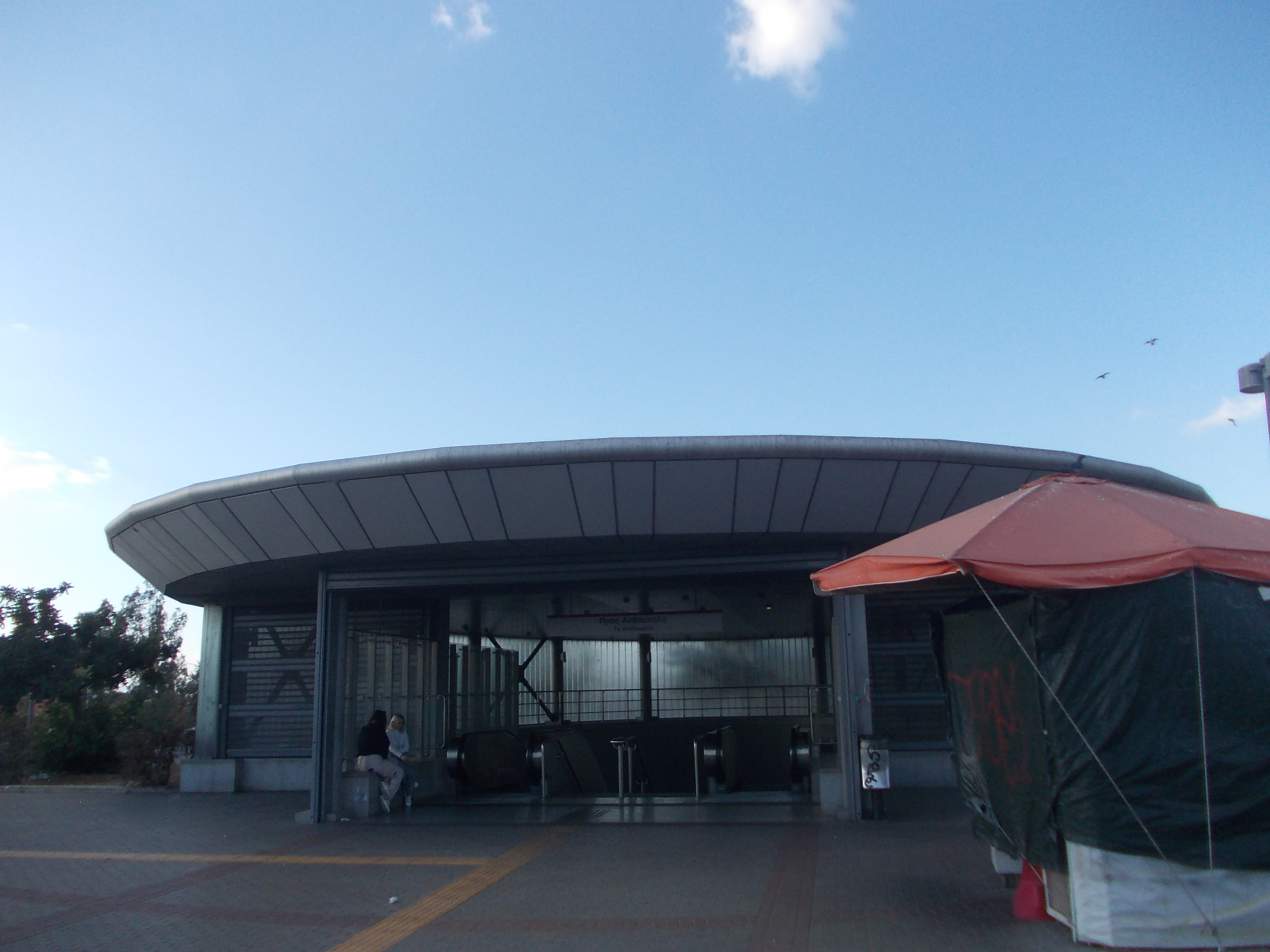
Entrance on the west of Vouliagmenis Avenue

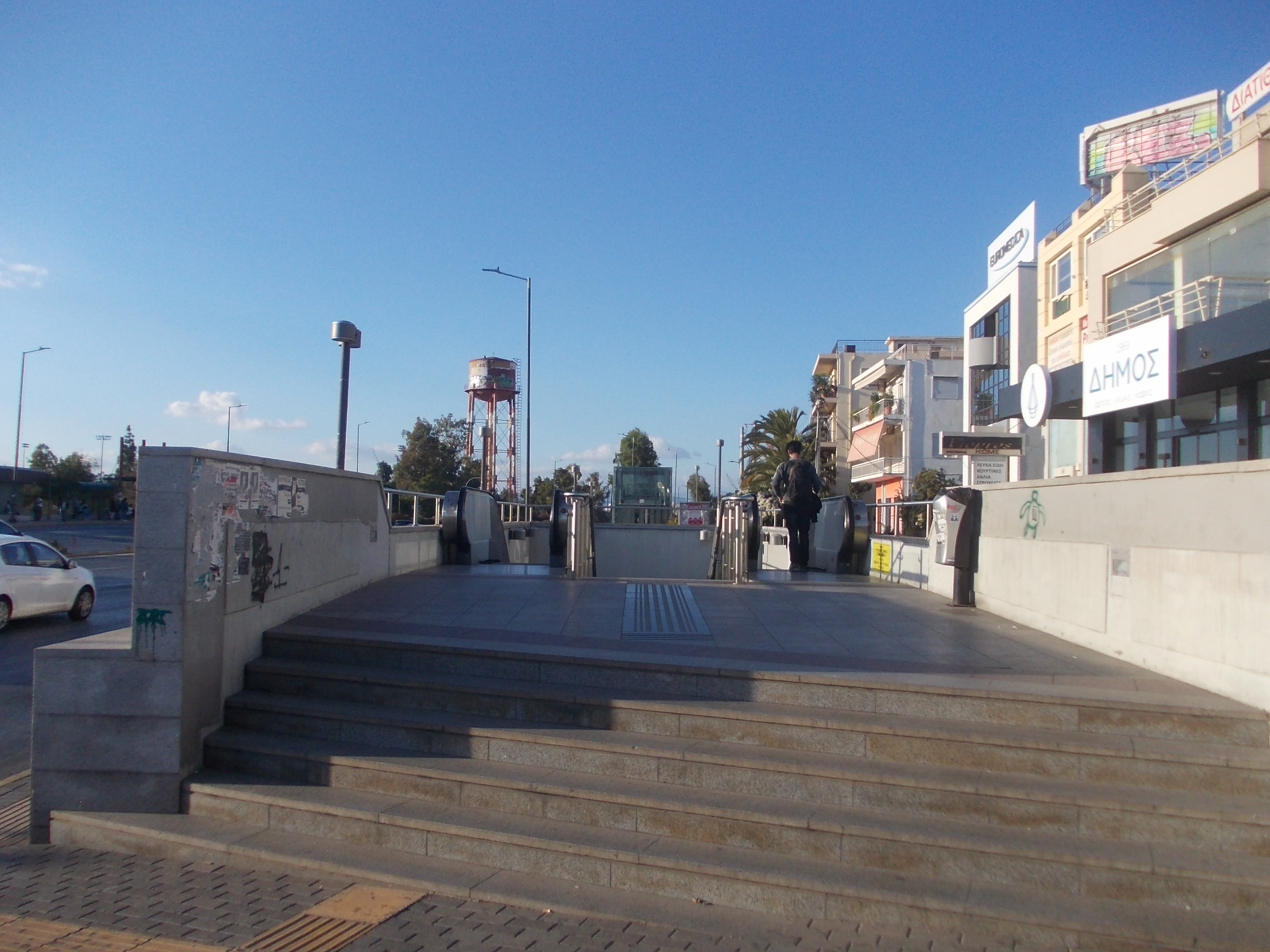
Entrance on the east of Vouliagmenis Avenue, on the corner with Iasonidou street

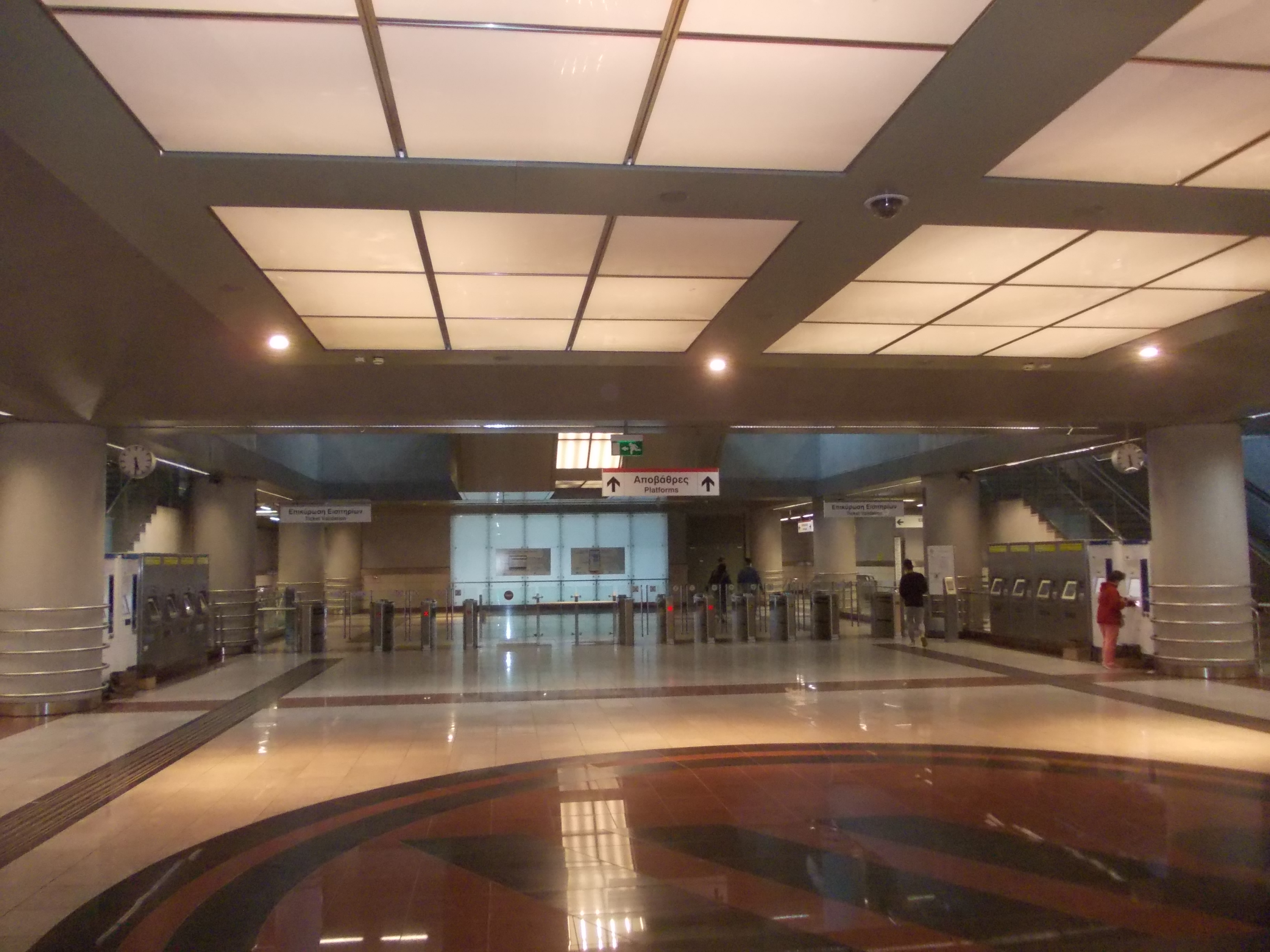
The station's concourse level

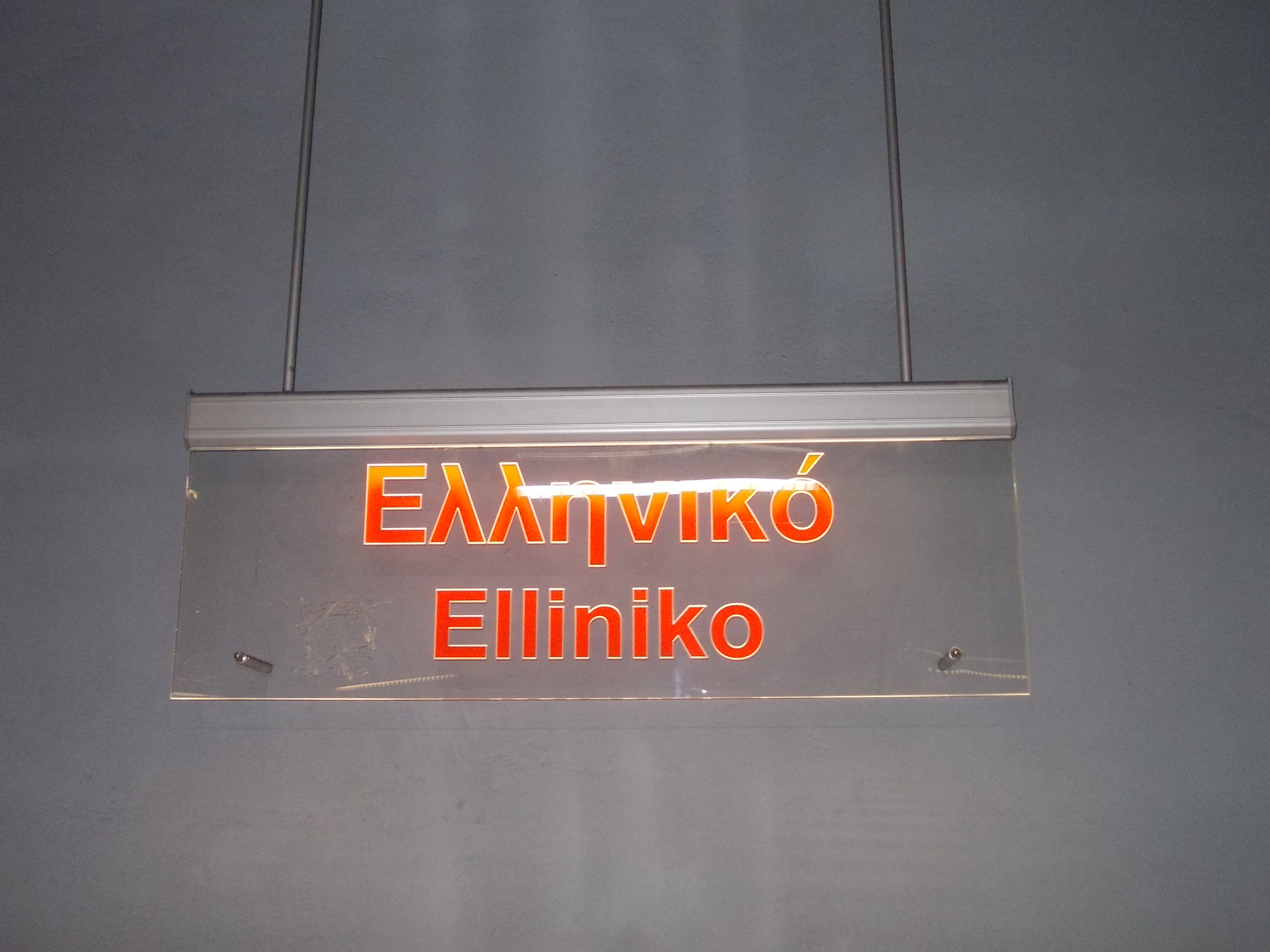
Station's sign on the platforms
