= Anthoupoli metro station =

Athens Metro station

Ανθούπολη Anthoupoli
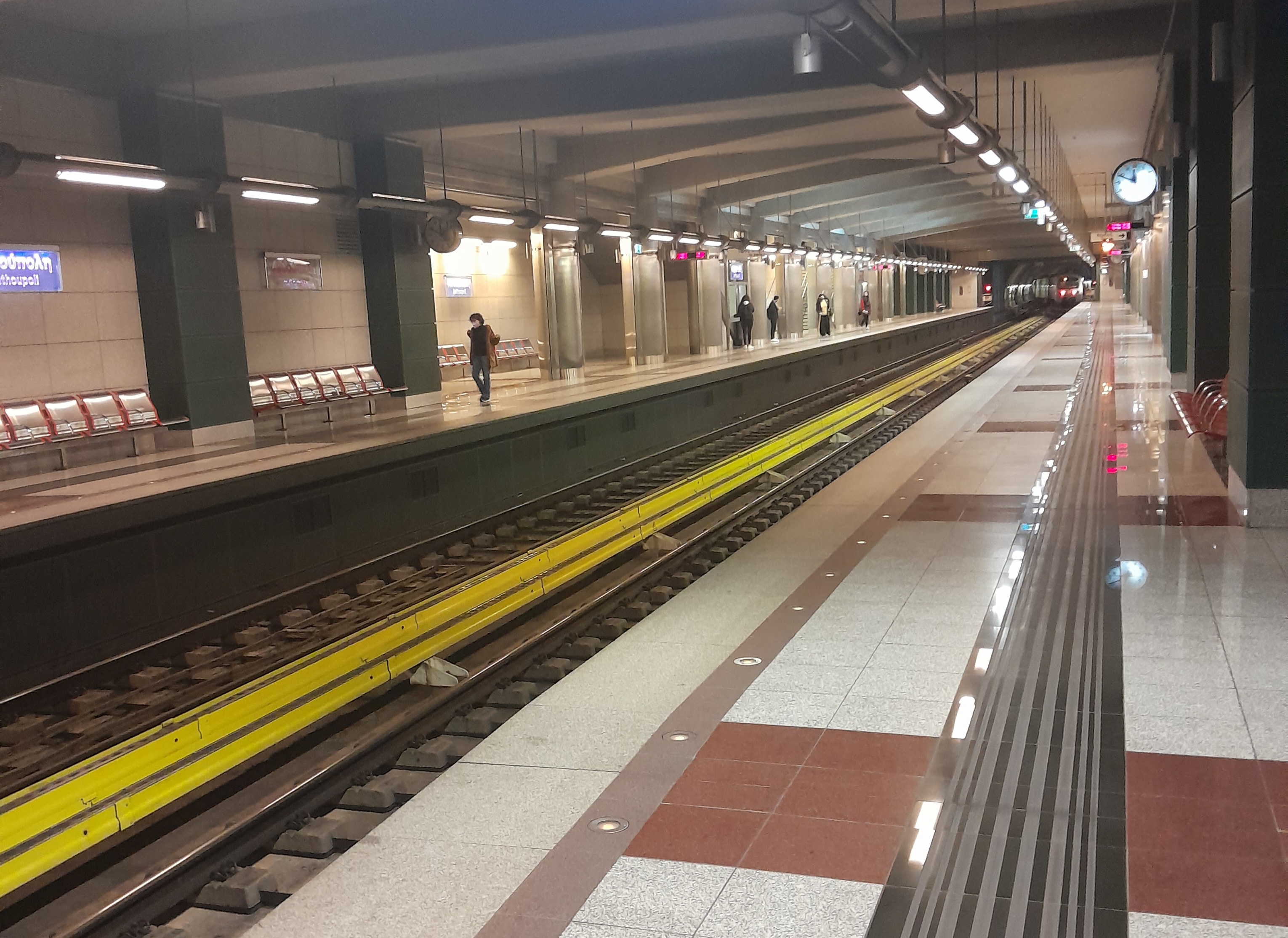
- Station platforms

General information
- Location: Thivon Street; 121 34 Peristeri; Greece
- Coordinates: 38°01′01″N 23°41′30″E
- Manager: STASY
- Line: Athens Metro Line 2
- Platforms: 2
- Tracks: 2

Construction
- Structure type: Underground
- Accessible: Yes

Key dates
- 6 April 2013: Opened

Services
Preceding station	Athens Metro	Following station
Terminus	Line 2	Peristeri towards Elliniko
Location

Anthoupoli (Greek: Ανθούπολη) is the northern terminal station of Athens Metro Line 2 since the Peristeri extension in April 2013.

During planning in the late-1990s, the station was known as "Thivon" (Θηβών), after a nearby major north-south road between Ilion and Piraeus.

== Station layout ==
G Ground	-	Exits
C Concourse	Concourse	Customer Service, Tickets
P Platforms	Side platform, doors will open on the right
P Platforms	Platform 1	→ For use by inbound trains
P Platforms	Platform 2	→ towards Elliniko (Peristeri) →
P Platforms	Side platform, doors will open on the right
