= Koukaki =

Koukaki Κουκάκι
- Neighborhood
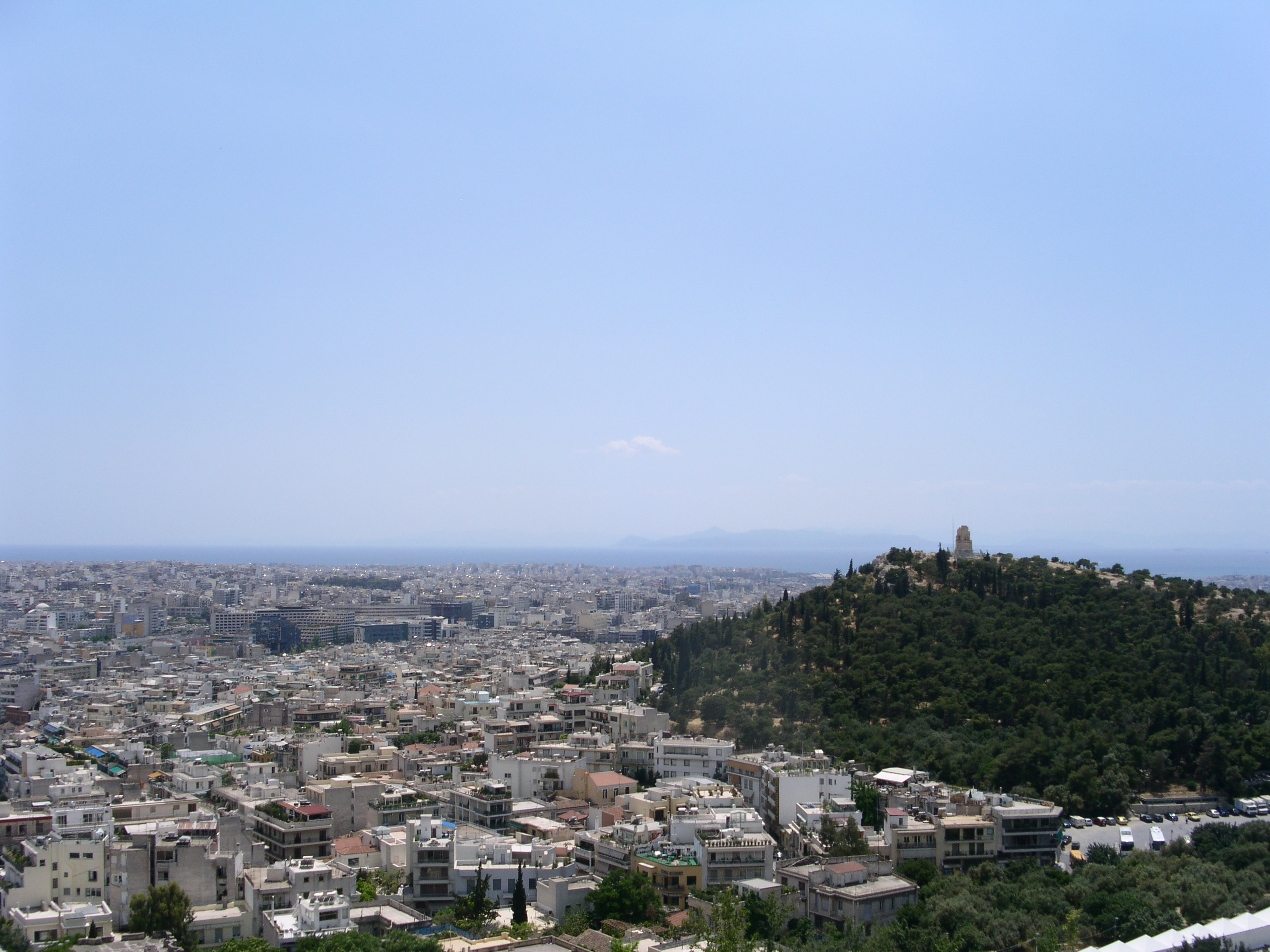
- Koukaki from the Acropolis

- Location within Athens
- Coordinates: 37°57′45″N 23°43′15″E
- Country: Greece
- Region: Attica
- City: Athens
- Postal code: 117 41, 117 42
- Area code: 210
- Website: www.cityofathens.gr

Koukaki (Greek: Κουκάκι or Κουκάκη, pronounced [kuˈkaci]) is a southeast neighbourhood of Athens, Greece.

== Location ==
The general area of Koukaki borders from the north with Makrygianni neighbourhood and the historical district of Plaka (the historical neighbourhood of Athens), the Municipality of Kallithea and Petralona neighbourhood from the south, Neos Kosmos neighbourhood from the east, and Filopappou and Thisio neighbourhoods from the west. The two largest streets that cross Koukaki are Veikou Street (north-to-south) and Dimitrakopoulou Street (south-to-north). On the borderline between Koukaki and Neos Kosmos stands Andrea Syngrou Avenue, an important avenue in Athens that connects its center with Poseidonos Avenue to the south.

=== Amenities ===
It has a large weekly vegetable market every Friday.

== Transportation ==
Koukaki is served by two Athens Metro stations, Akropoli (near the Acropolis) and Syngrou–Fix (on Andrea Syngrou Avenue). The nearest overground station is Petralona.

Koukaki is served by both lines (Syntagma-SEF and Syntagma-Kolimvitirio) of the Athens Tram (L. Vouliagmenis and Fix stops).

Koukaki is served by a large number of bus routes along Andrea Syngrou Avenue, including 040, 106, 126, 136, 137, 230, A2, B2. In terms of trolley bus, Routes 1, 5, and 15 have stops along Veikou and Dimitrakopoulou streets.

== Points of interest ==
- The Agios Ioannis (St. John's Church)
- The ruins of the Fix (beer) brewery on Andrea Syngrou Avenue which are today's National Museum of Contemporary Art, Athens
- The cafe and restaurant-filled Drakou pedestrian zone from Gargaretta Square
- The cafe and restaurant-filled G. Olympiou pedestrian zone from Koukaki Square
- The 14th and 33rd high-schools of Athens
- The John Palaiologos neoclassical residence (1900s), Veikou 6, Today open to visitors as Generation 6

== Famous current and former residents ==
- Koula Agagiotou (1915–2006), Greek actress
- Nikolaos Kaklamanakis (1968- ), Greek Olympic gold medalist
- Sapfo Notara (1907–1985), Greek actress
- Ekaterini Thanou (1975– ), Greek athlete
- Mikis Theodorakis (1925–2021), composer
- Viky Vanita (1948?–2007), Greek actress
- Dimosthenis Voutyras (1871?–1958), Greek writer
- Nana Mouskouri (1934– ), Greek singer
