= Antiparochí =

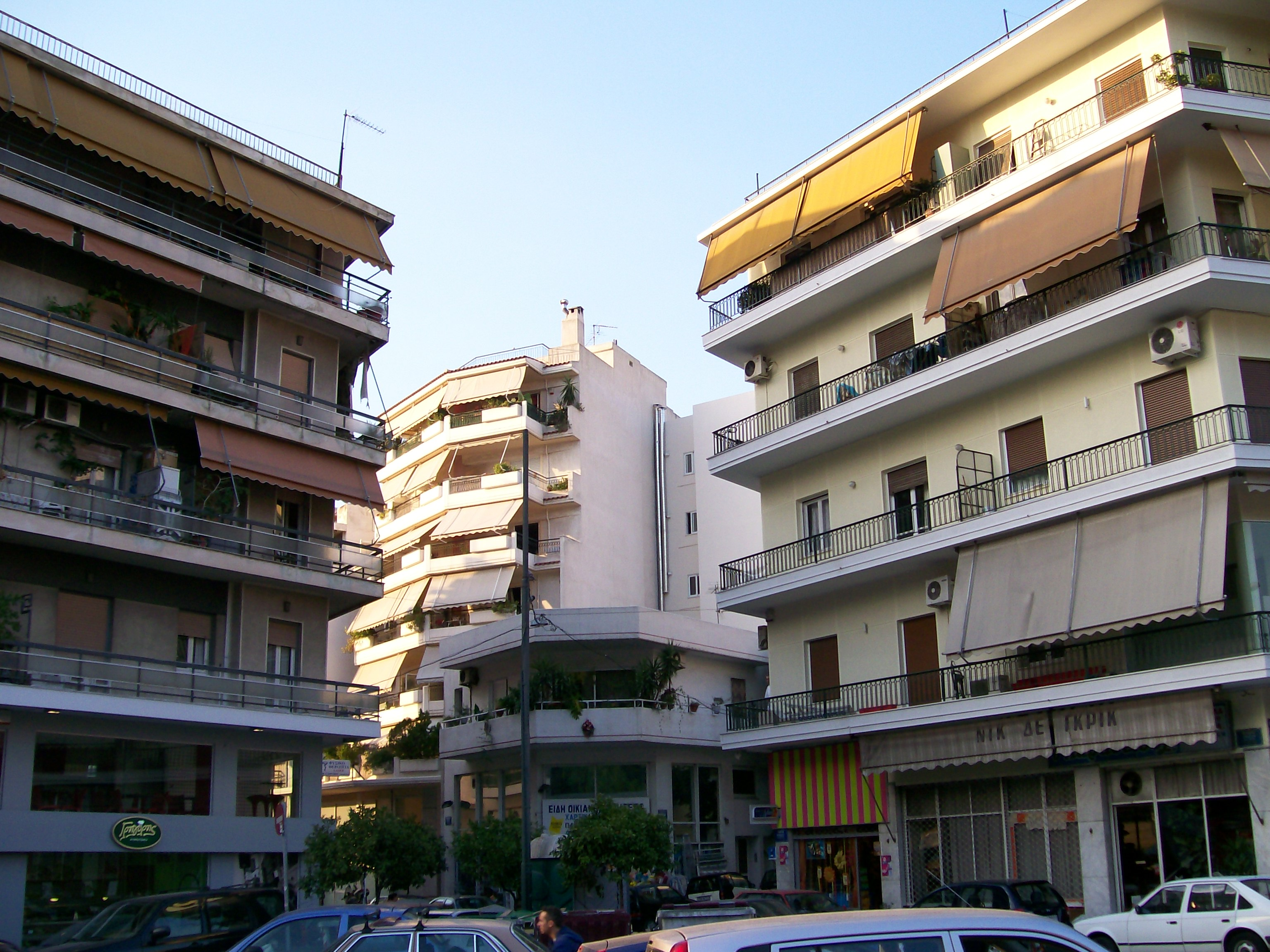
Typical buildings in Neos Kosmos, Athens

Antiparochí (Greek: αντιπαροχή, lit. 'property swap') is an equity financing mechanism, common in Greece and Cyprus during the postwar period, which entails the conclusion of an agreement between a real estate developer and a landowner, in terms of which the landowner contributes immovable property to be used for residential property development, in exchange for a portion of the real estate unit or units upon completion of the development. The mechanism was facilitated in Greece by the passage, in 1929, of the Law of Property Division, and the General Building Regulation, which provided the legal framework for collective ownership of a property unit, and prescribed technical rules for the construction of apartments, respectively.

The system is credited with increasing access to low-cost housing and contributing to economic growth in Greece during the postwar period. It has also, however, been criticised for precipitating the demolition of much of Greece's 19th-century neoclassical architecture, transforming Greek cities, particularly Athens, into what have been referred to as "form-less, border-less and placeless urban landscape[s]".
