= Agios Ioannis metro station =

Athens Metro station

Άγιος Ιωάννης Aghios Ioannis
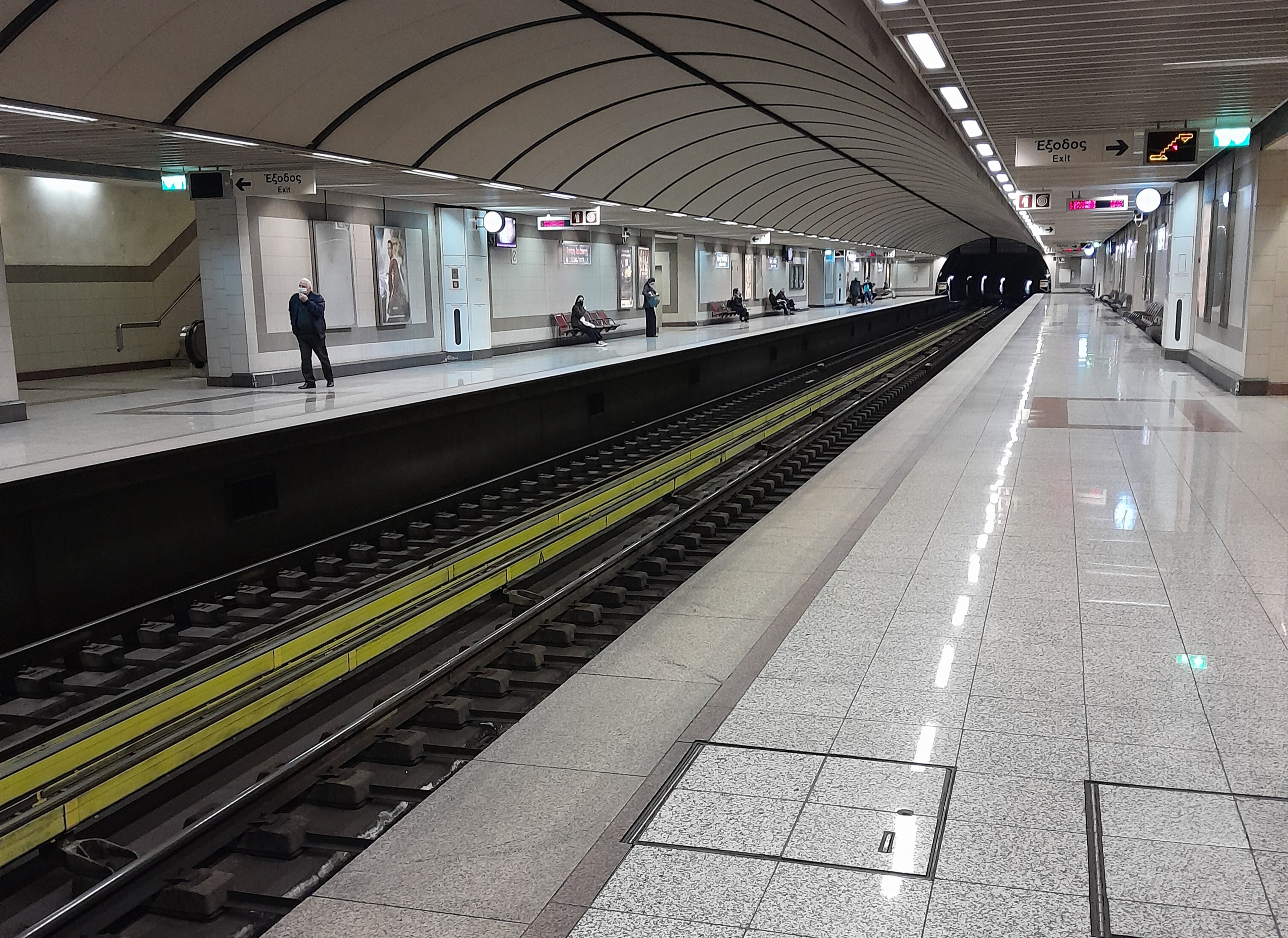
- Station platforms

General information
- Location: Neos Kosmos; Athens; Greece
- Coordinates: 37.9565°N 23.7342°E
- Manager: STASY
- Line: Athens Metro Line 2
- Platforms: 2
- Tracks: 2

Construction
- Structure type: Underground
- Accessible: Yes

Key dates
- 15 November 2000: Opened

Services
Preceding station	Athens Metro	Following station
Neos Kosmos towards Anthoupoli	Line 2	Dafni towards Elliniko
Location

Agios Ioannis (Greek: Άγιος Ιωάννης, lit. 'St. John's'), also known as Aghios Ioannis on signage, is a station on Athens Metro Line 2. The station opened on 15 November 2000, as part of the extension from Syntagma to Dafni.

== History ==
The station was part of the original Athens Metro plan that was approved in 1991. It opened on 15 November 2000 along with the Syntagma-Dafni extension, 10 months after the first section of the system opened.

== Station layout ==
G Ground	-	Exits
C Concourse	Concourse	Customer Service, Tickets
P Platforms	Side platform, doors will open on the right
P Platforms	Platform 1	← towards Anthoupoli (Neos Kosmos)
P Platforms	Platform 2	→ towards Elliniko (Dafni) →
P Platforms	Side platform, doors will open on the right

== Entrances ==
The station can be reached by two entrances, both on Agios Ioannis Square. The one is located near Kasomouli street and the other near Pytheou street. There is also an elevator located on the square.

== Gallery ==
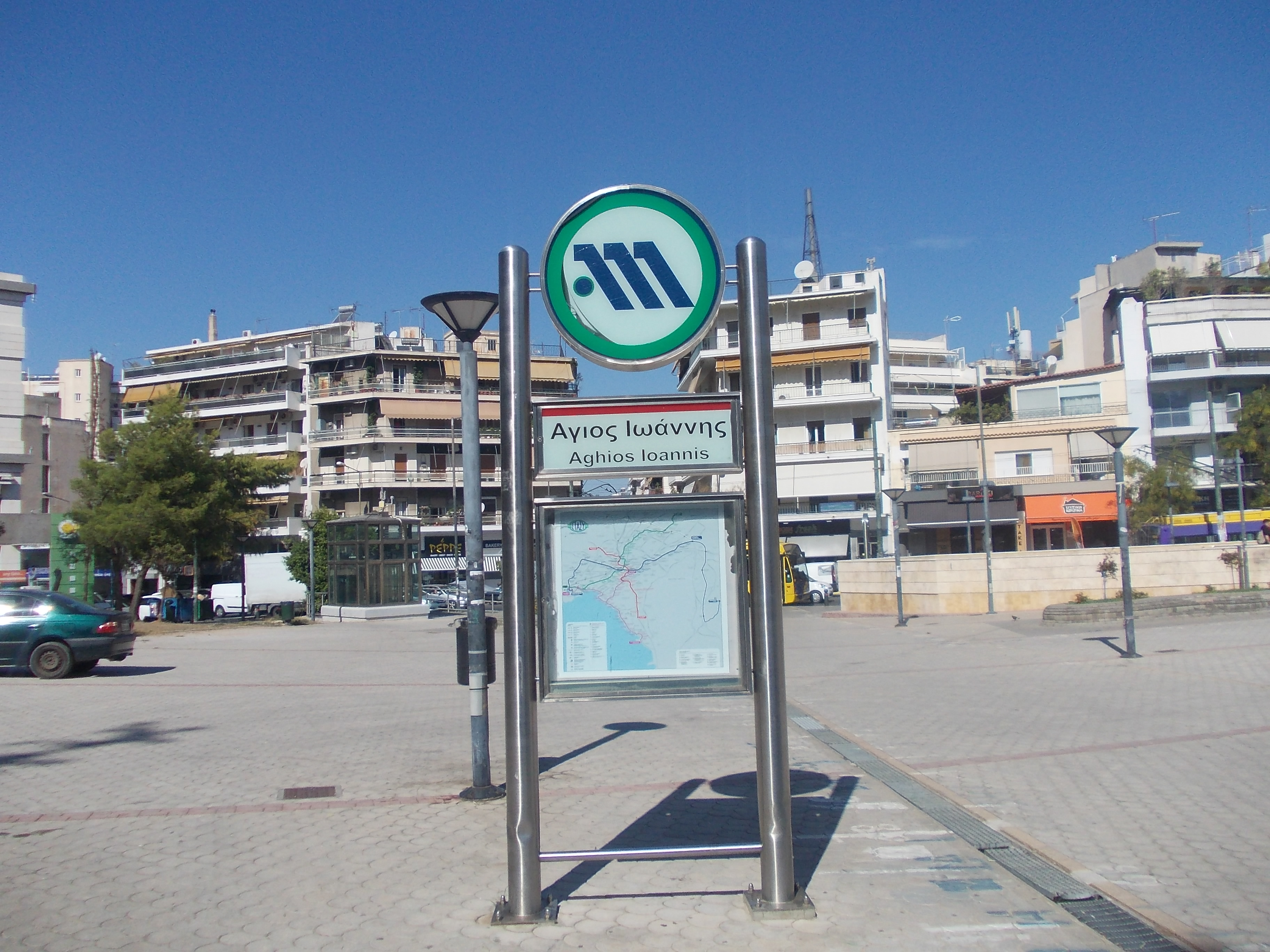
Sign on Agios Ioannis Square

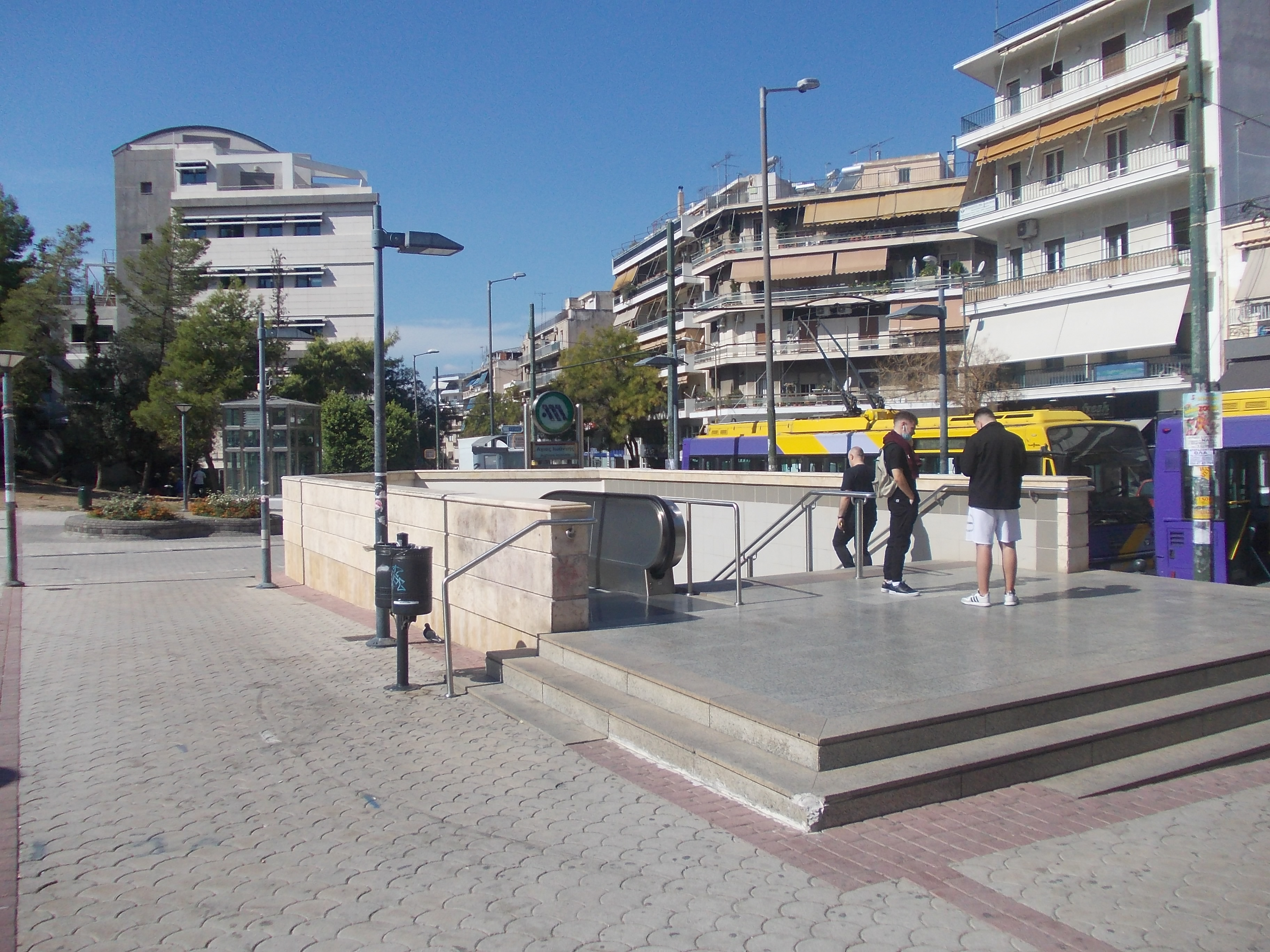
Entrance at Kasomouli street

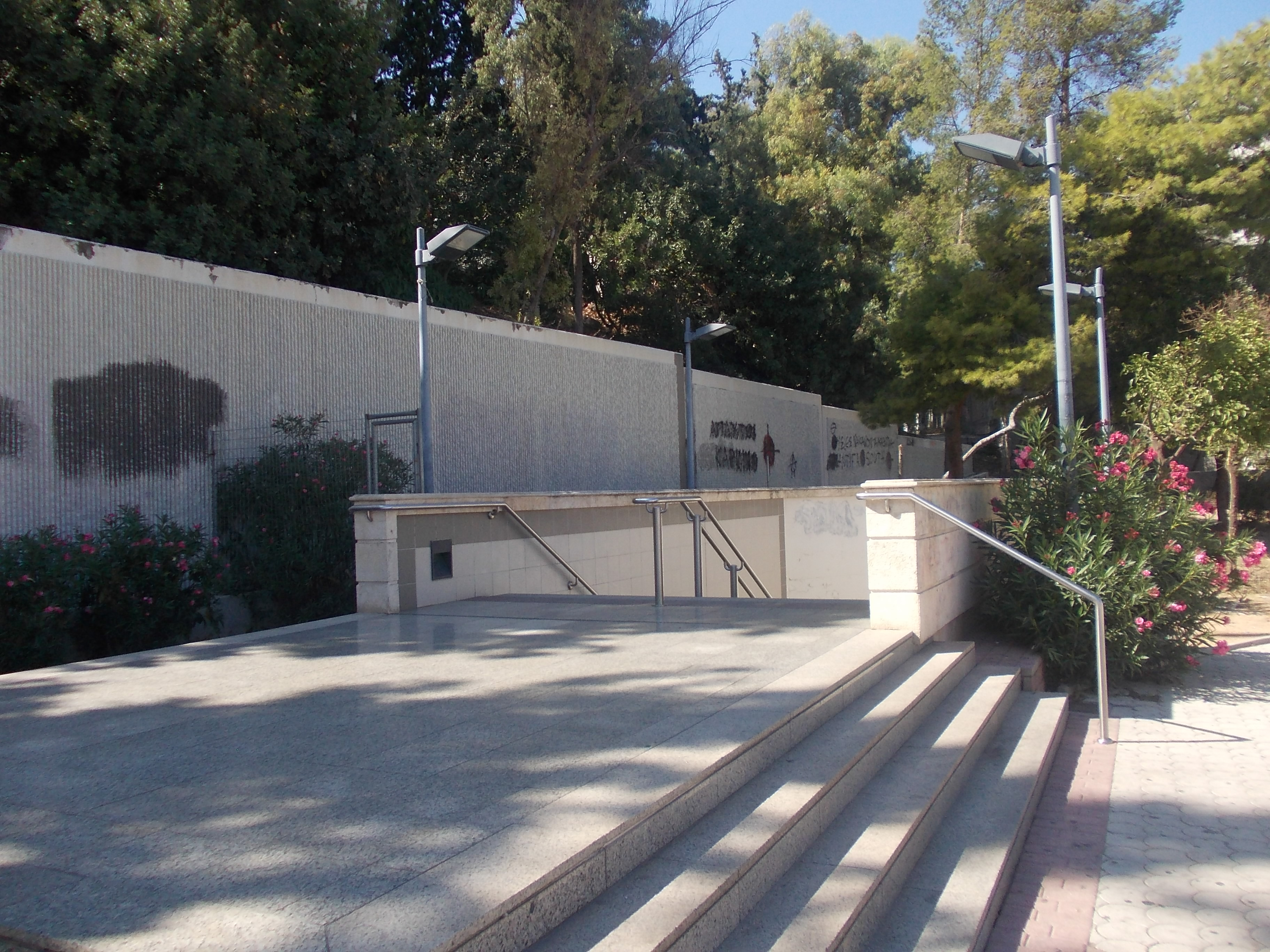
Entrance at Pytheou street

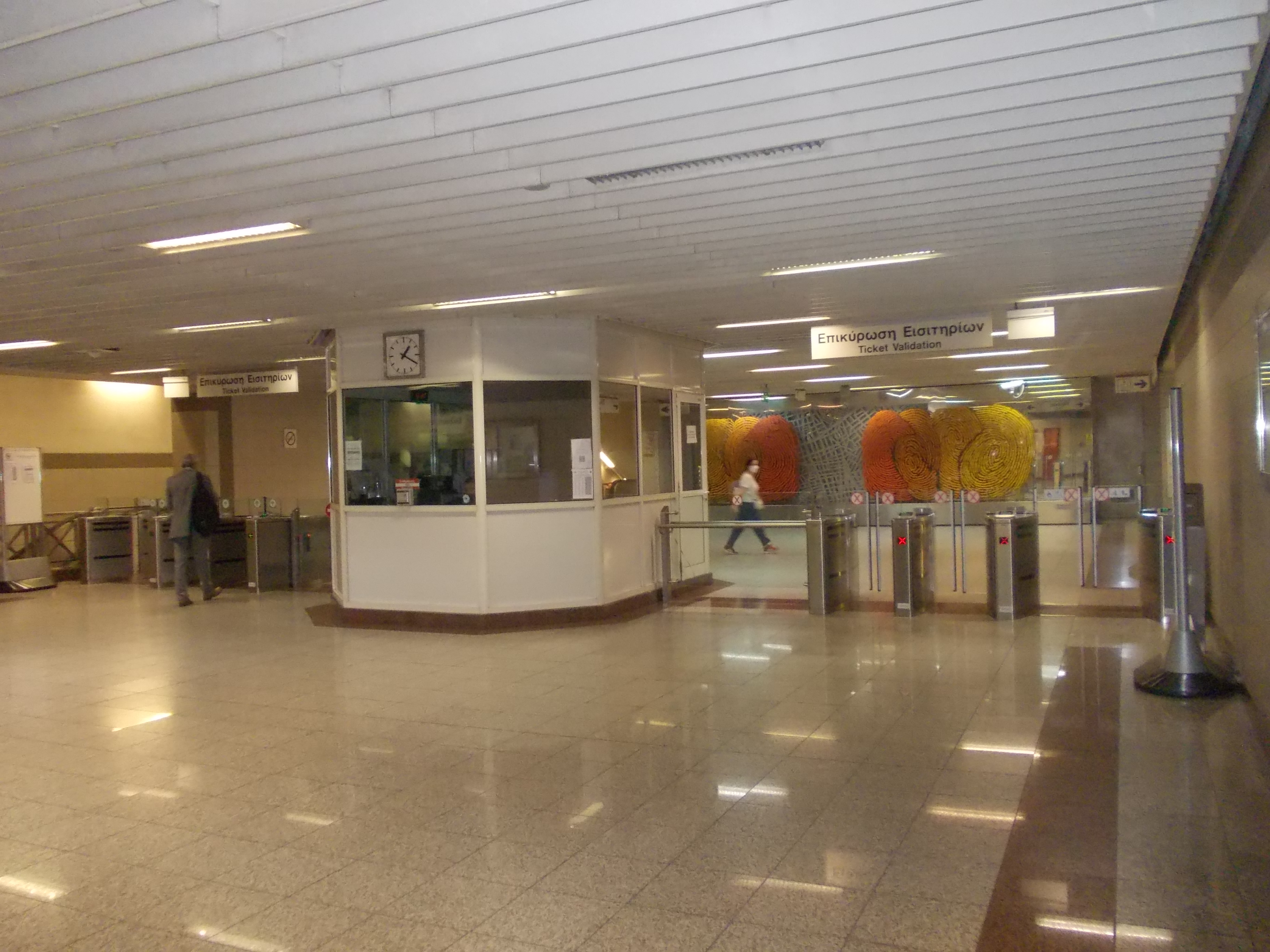
The station's concourse level

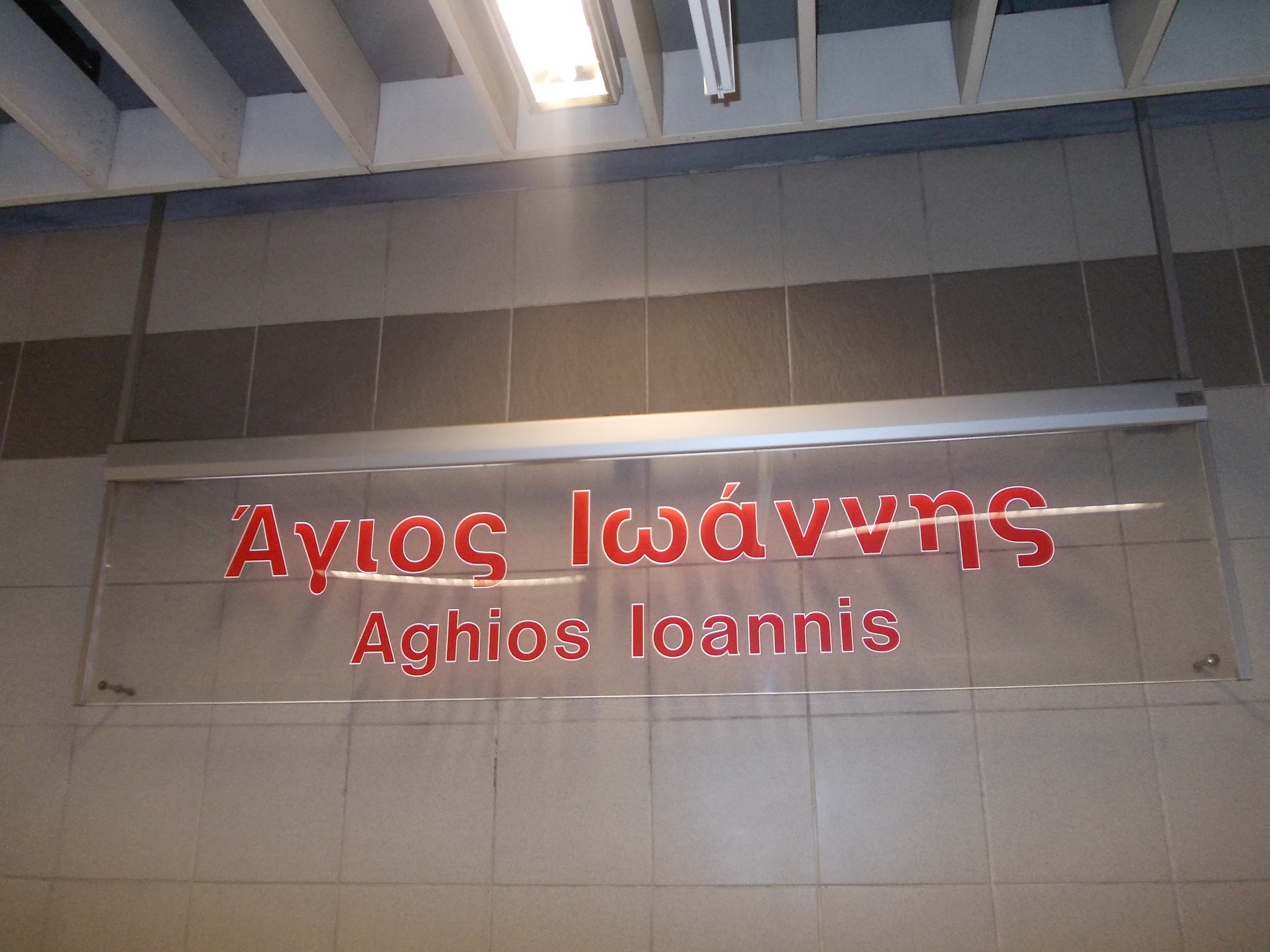
Station's sign on the platforms
