= Neos Kosmos, Athens =

Neos Kosmos Νέος Κόσμος
- Neighborhood
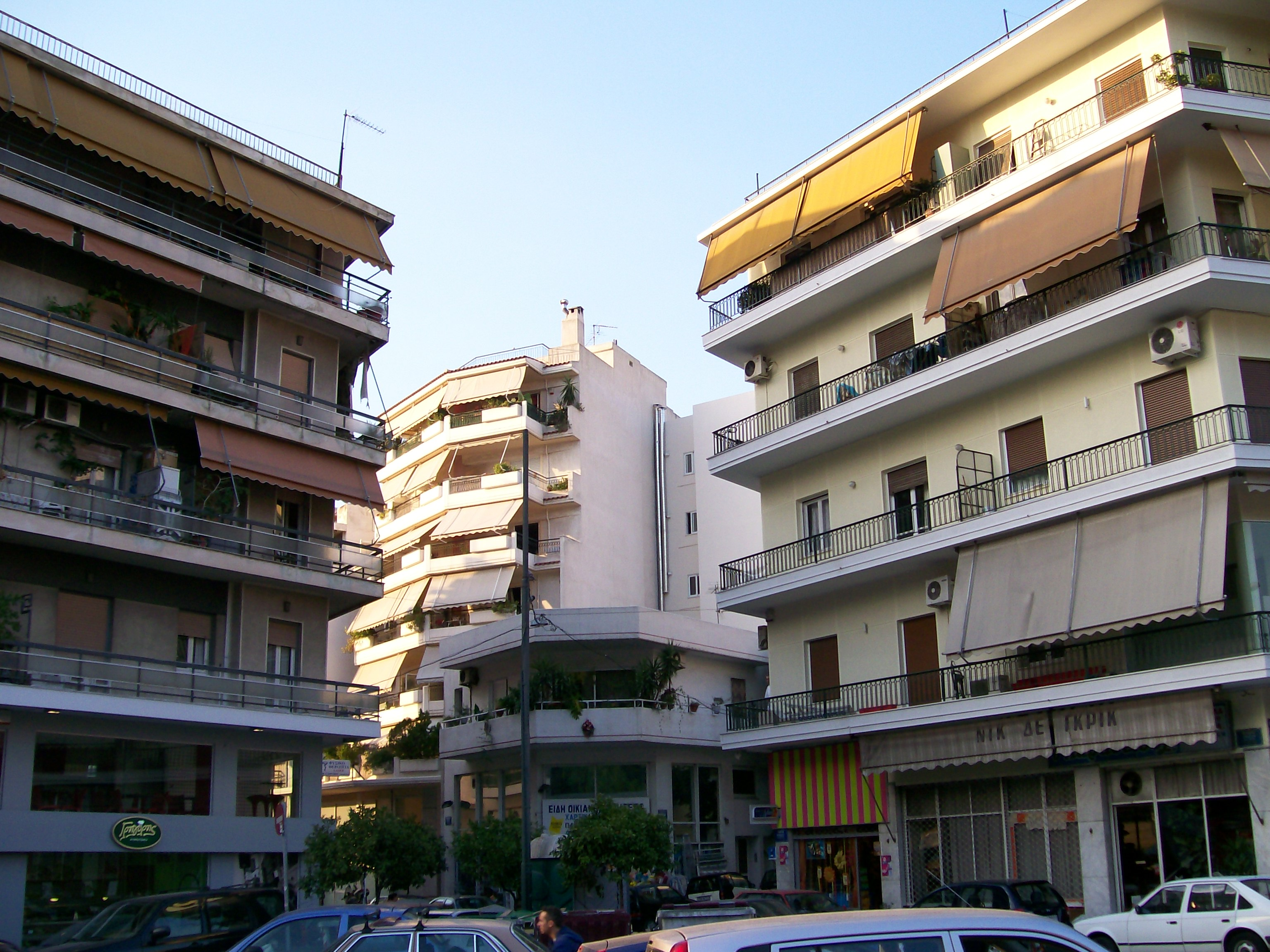
- Scene of Neos Kosmos, Athens, Greece

- Location within Athens municipality
- Coordinates: 37°57′32″N 23°43′57″E
- Country: Greece
- Region: Attica
- City: Athens
- Postal code: 117 43, 117 44, 117 45,
- Area code: 210
- Website: www.cityofathens.gr

Neos Kosmos (Greek: Νέος Κόσμος [ˈneos ˈkosmos]; meaning "New World") is a neighborhood in downtown Athens, Greece. It was named third coolest neighborhood in the world.

== History ==
In classical antiquity, the area of Neos Kosmos may have been the location of the gymnasium Cynosarges.

== Geography ==
Neos Kosmos is south of the historic centre of the city. Andrea Syngrou Avenue is one of the main roads of Neos Kosmos.

== Climate ==
Neos Kosmos has a hot-summer mediterranean (Csa) closely bordering a hot semi-arid climate (Köppen climate classification: BSh) climate. It has mild winters and hot summers. It is the warmest area of Downtown Athens with an average annual temperature of 20.2°C. The highest temperature in Neos Kosmos was 42.8°C and it was recorded on August 3, 2021 while the minimum temperature that day was a stunning 32.2°C. In July 2024 Neos Kosmos recorded 11 days with a minimum temperature over 30.0°C.

Climate data for Neos Kosmos, downtown Athens 85 m a.s.l.
Month	Jan	Feb	Mar	Apr	May	Jun	Jul	Aug	Sep	Oct	Nov	Dec	Year
Record high °C (°F)	22.8 (73.0)	25.0 (77.0)	25.4 (77.7)	31.2 (88.2)	36.4 (97.5)	41.2 (106.2)	42.6 (108.7)	42.8 (109.0)	38.1 (100.6)	32.6 (90.7)	27.5 (81.5)	23.4 (74.1)	42.8 (109.0)
Mean daily maximum °C (°F)	14.1 (57.4)	15.2 (59.4)	17.6 (63.7)	21.6 (70.9)	25.8 (78.4)	31.1 (88.0)	34.1 (93.4)	33.6 (92.5)	29.6 (85.3)	24.1 (75.4)	19.8 (67.6)	15.6 (60.1)	23.5 (74.3)
Daily mean °C (°F)	11.3 (52.3)	12.3 (54.1)	14.4 (57.9)	18.0 (64.4)	22.1 (71.8)	27.2 (81.0)	30.3 (86.5)	30.0 (86.0)	26.1 (79.0)	20.8 (69.4)	16.9 (62.4)	13.0 (55.4)	20.2 (68.4)
Mean daily minimum °C (°F)	8.6 (47.5)	9.4 (48.9)	11.1 (52.0)	14.3 (57.7)	18.4 (65.1)	23.4 (74.1)	26.6 (79.9)	26.4 (79.5)	22.6 (72.7)	17.6 (63.7)	14.0 (57.2)	10.4 (50.7)	16.9 (62.4)
Record low °C (°F)	−1.2 (29.8)	−0.5 (31.1)	0.0 (32.0)	5.2 (41.4)	12.6 (54.7)	15.8 (60.4)	19.6 (67.3)	20.8 (69.4)	15.7 (60.3)	9.3 (48.7)	6.7 (44.1)	0.9 (33.6)	−1.2 (29.8)
Average rainfall mm (inches)	52.1 (2.05)	47.0 (1.85)	31.9 (1.26)	19.0 (0.75)	17.0 (0.67)	21.0 (0.83)	5.9 (0.23)	6.0 (0.24)	21.2 (0.83)	40.6 (1.60)	60.0 (2.36)	69.6 (2.74)	391.3 (15.41)
Source 1: National Observatory of Athens Monthly Bulletins (Oct 2010 - Sep 2025)
Source 2: Neos Kosmos N.O.A station, World Meteorological Organization

== Public Transportation ==
=== Subway ===
Neos Kosmos has three Athens Metro subway stations: Syngrou–Fix, Neos Kosmos and Agios Ioannis.

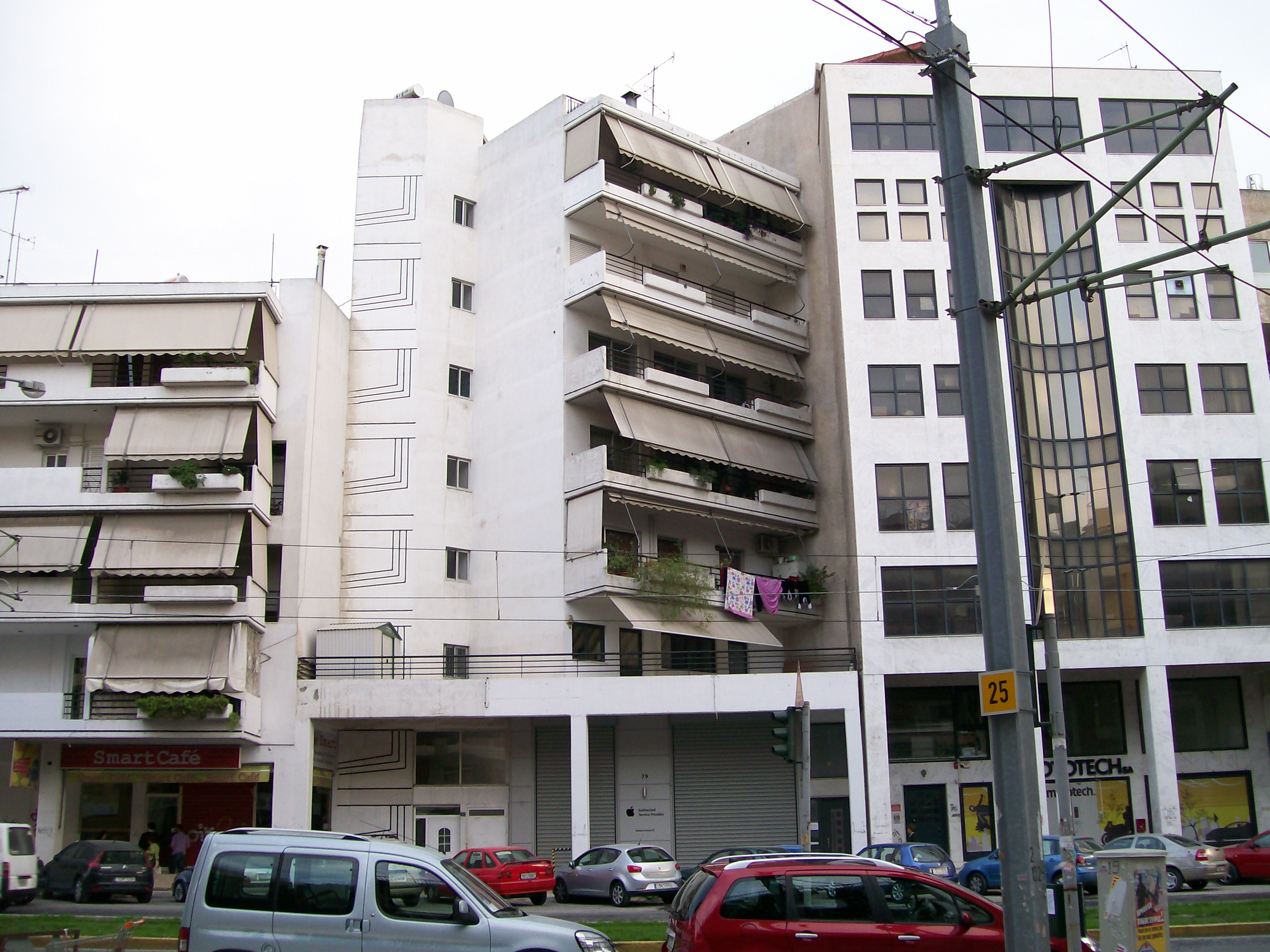
Buildings along Kasomouli Street in Neos Kosmos

=== Tram ===
Neos Kosmos is also served by the Athens Tram.

== Sports ==
Thriamvos Athens, a multisport club founded in 1930, is based in Neos Kosmos. The club has won a panhellenic title in women's basketball and competes in various sports such as football, basketball, and volleyball.
