= Thodoros Papadimitriou =

Greek sculptor (1931–2018)

- Θεόδωρος Παπαδημητρίου
- Born: 1931; Agrinio, Greece
- Died: 8 June 2018 (aged 87)
- Education: École des Beaux-Arts
- Known for: Sculpture

Theodoros Papadimitriou (Greek: Θεόδωρος Παπαδημητρίου; 1931 – 8 June 2018), also known simply as Theodoros (Θόδωρος), was a Greek sculptor who achieved international recognition.

== Biography ==
He was born in Agrinio in 1931 where he passed his childhood years and came into the years. His family descended from the mountainous village of Agios Vlassios. He fininsed the gymnasium at Agrinio in 1949 and left for Athens where in 1951 he entered the arts school. After his studies in Athens and his years in the military, he moved for Paris where he spend three years at the Εcole S. Des Beaux-Arts. He remained for several years in Paris where he became famous as a sculptor. When the dictatorship known as the Regime of the Colonels, he fled and left for San Francisco in the United States nearly the other side of Greece and taught at the California State University. After several years in France and the United States, he returned to Greece where he lives since after the fall of the dictatorship and in 1980 he became a professor of plastic in the architect school.

== Works ==
He made dozens of sculptures in Greece and worldwide, and won several awards. One of his most popular works include the sculptures at the Syntagma of the Athens Metro.
