= Syntagma Metro Station Archaeological Collection =

Coordinates: 37°58′31.75″N 23°44′6.45″E

The Syntagma Metro Station Archaeological Collection
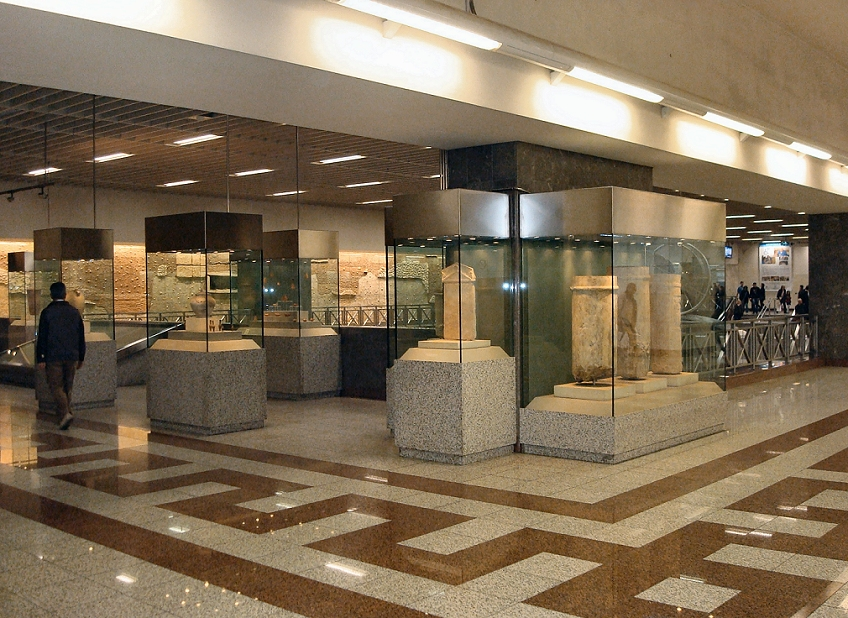
- Location: Syntagma Square, Athens, Greece
- Type: Archaeological museum
- Public transit access: Syntagma station Syntagma

The Syntagma Metro Station Archeological Collection is a museum in Athens, Greece. It is located at the Syntagma station of the Athens metro and it features a variety of historical items unearthed during the process of building the metro.
