= Acropolis metro station =

Athens Metro station

Ακρόπολη Acropolis
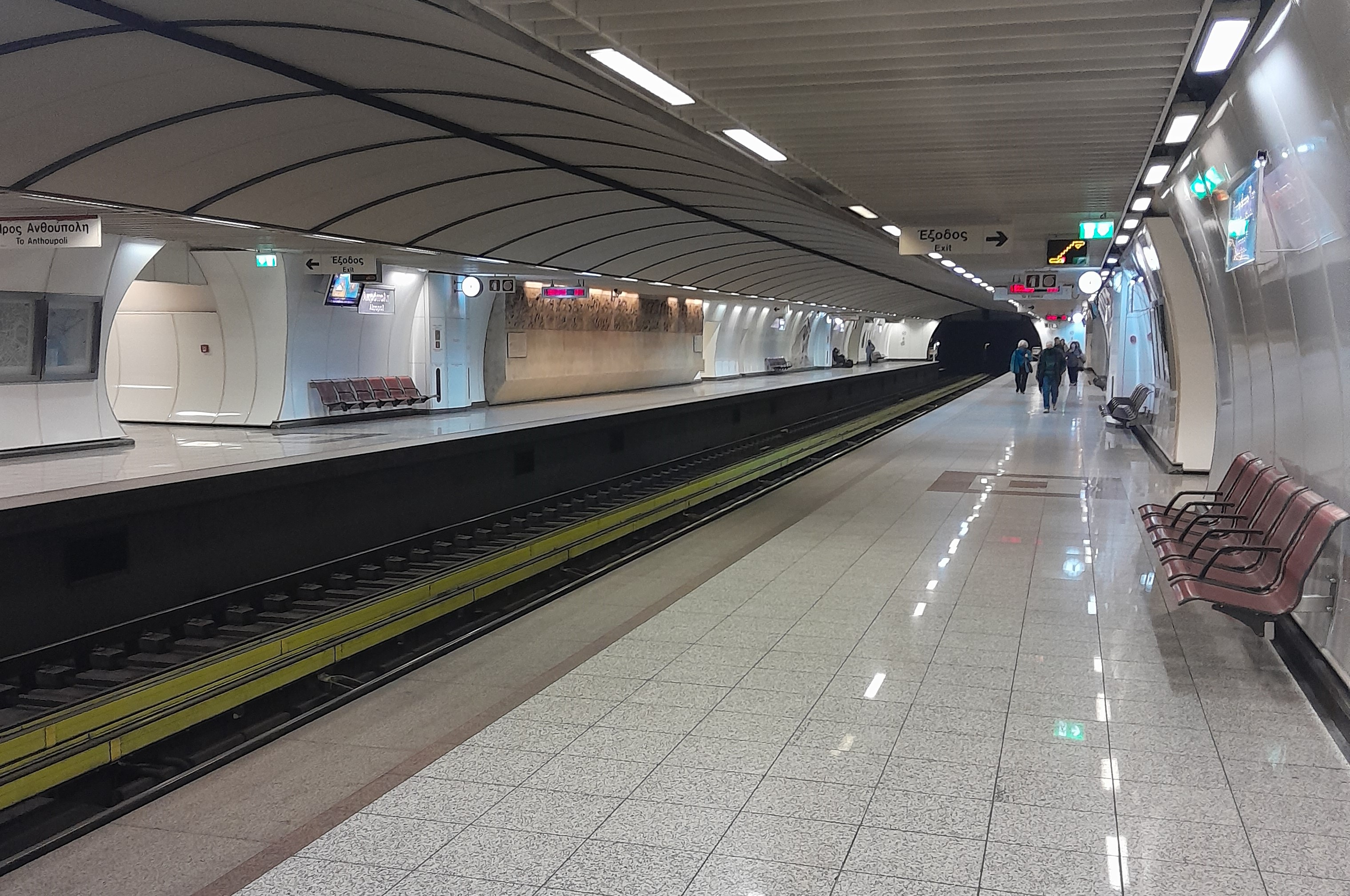
- Station platforms in February 2023

General information
- Other names: Akropoli; Olympieion
- Location: Acropolis; Athens; Greece
- Coordinates: 37.968679°N 23.729600°E
- Manager: STASY
- Line: Athens Metro Line 2
- Platforms: 2
- Tracks: 2

Construction
- Structure type: Underground
- Accessible: Yes

Key dates
- 15 November 2000: Opened

Services
Preceding station	Athens Metro	Following station
Syntagma towards Anthoupoli	Line 2	Syngrou–Fix towards Elliniko
Location

Acropolis (Greek: Ακρόπολη) is a station on Athens Metro Line 2. The station serves Plaka, Koukaki and Makrygianni.

== Location ==
The station is located under Makrygianni street in the Makrygianni neighbourhood of Athens. It is located on the east side of the Acropolis Museum and south of Dionysiou Areopagitou Street.

== History ==
The station appeared in the original Athens Metro plan which was funded in 1991 and when construction began it was to be named Olympieion after the Temple of Olympian Zeus. During construction the name was changed to its current name. The station opened on 15 November 2000 along with the Syntagma-Dafni extension, 10 months after the first section of the system opened. In 2025, the station's name in English was changed from the transliteration 'Akropoli' to Acropolis.

== Station Description ==
The station can be accessed by three ground-level entrances. Two are located on the eastern wall of the Acropolis Museum, one of which is elevator-only, while the third entrance is located on the other side of Makrygianni Str., at the finishing point of Athanasiou Diakou Str. Both entrances lead to the concourse level, which is decorated with antiquities. A big diagonal escalator leads from the concourse level to an intermediate level from which other escalators lead to the platforms. Both the concourse and intermediate levels' walls are covered with polished marble tiles. The platforms' walls are decorated with a curved-plastic-panel pattern, the same that can be found at Line 2's Omonoia and Panepistimio and Line 3's Syntagma and Ambelokipi stations. Parts of the platforms are covered by posters of Melina Merkouri and reproductions of the Elgin Marbles of Parthenon. The station is among the deepest of the system and is one of the very few that have three underground levels.

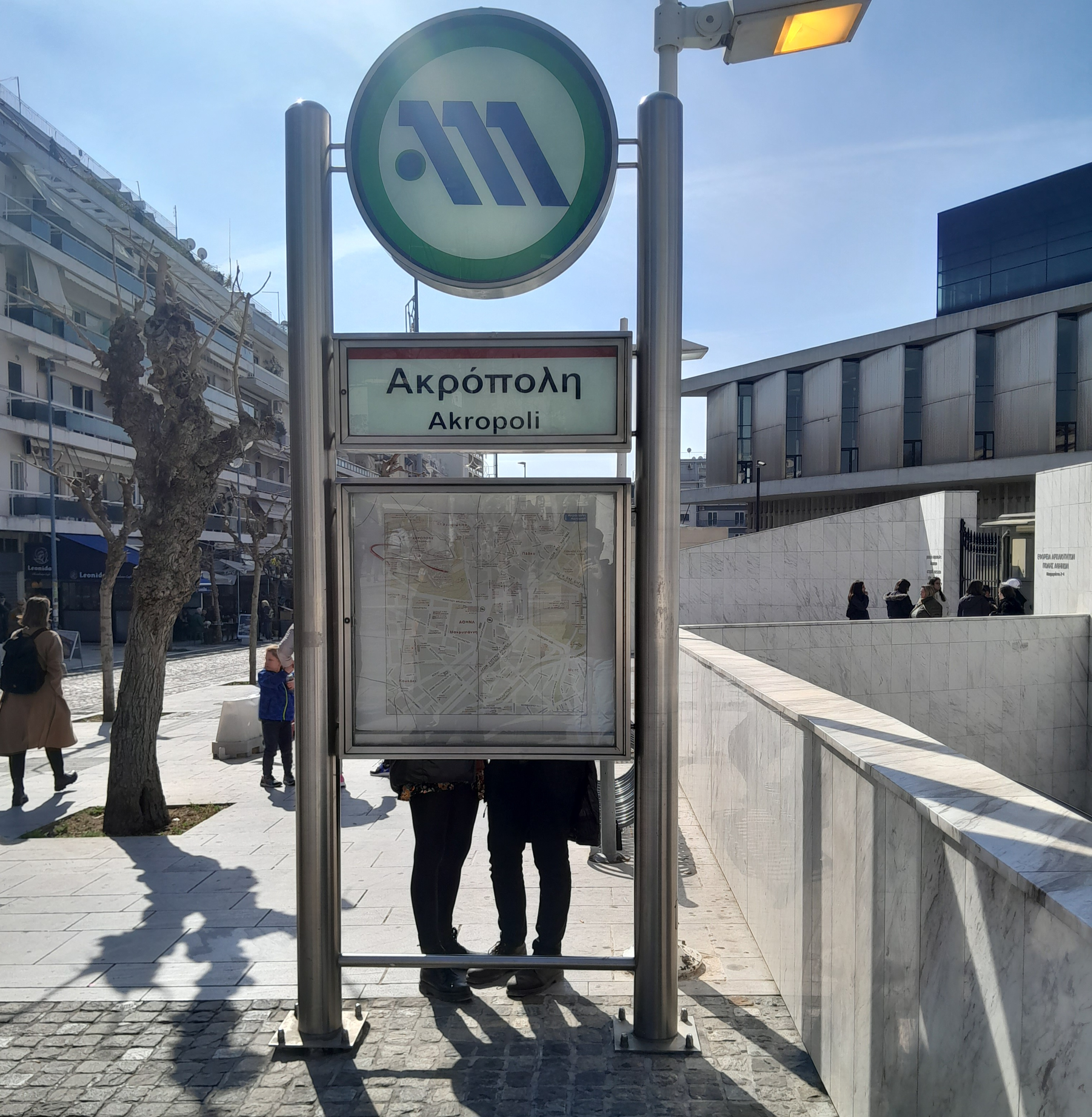
Sign on Makrygianni street

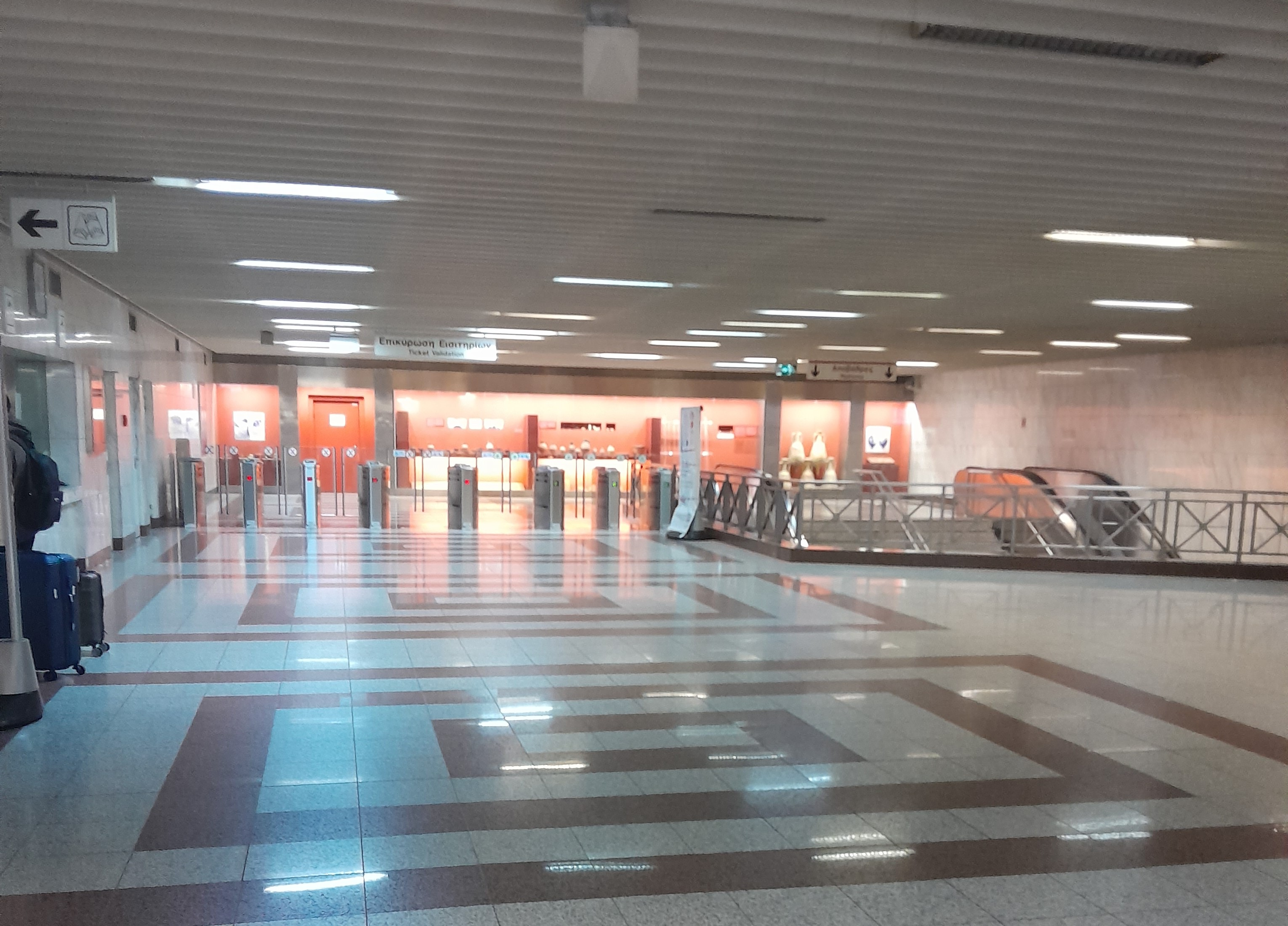
The station's concourse level

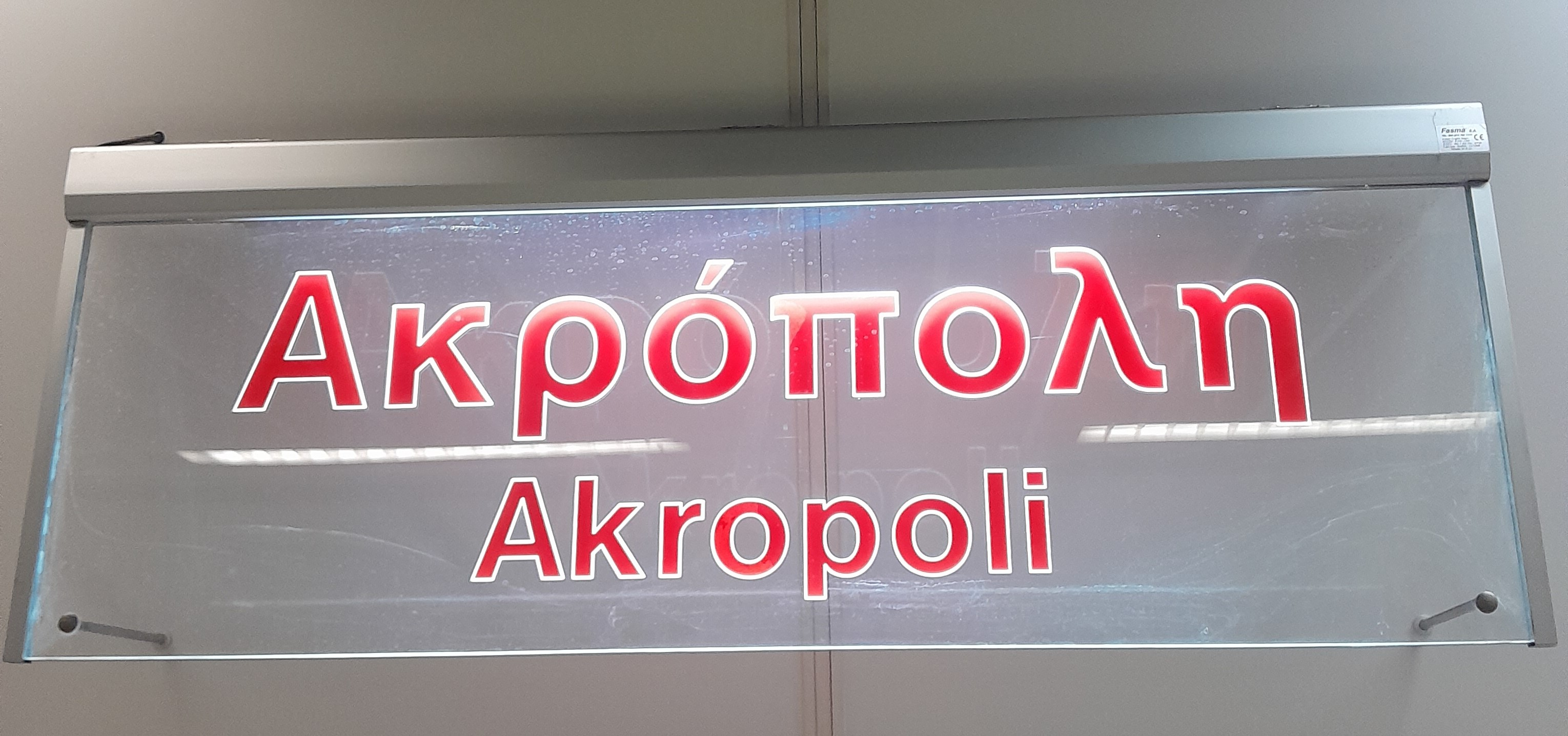
Station's sign on the platforms

== Exits ==
Exit	Location	Image	Accessibility	Coordinates
	Makrygianni Str.			37.968983°N 23.729536°E
	Makrygianni Str.			37.968592°N 23.729386°E
	Ath. Diakou Str.			37.968645°N 23.729821°E

== Station layout ==
G Ground	-	Exits
C Concourse	Concourse	Customer Service, Tickets
P Platforms	Side platform, doors will open on the right
P Platforms	Platform 1	← towards Anthoupoli (Syntagma)
P Platforms	Platform 2	→ towards Elliniko (Syngrou–Fix) →
P Platforms	Side platform, doors will open on the right

== Exhibits ==
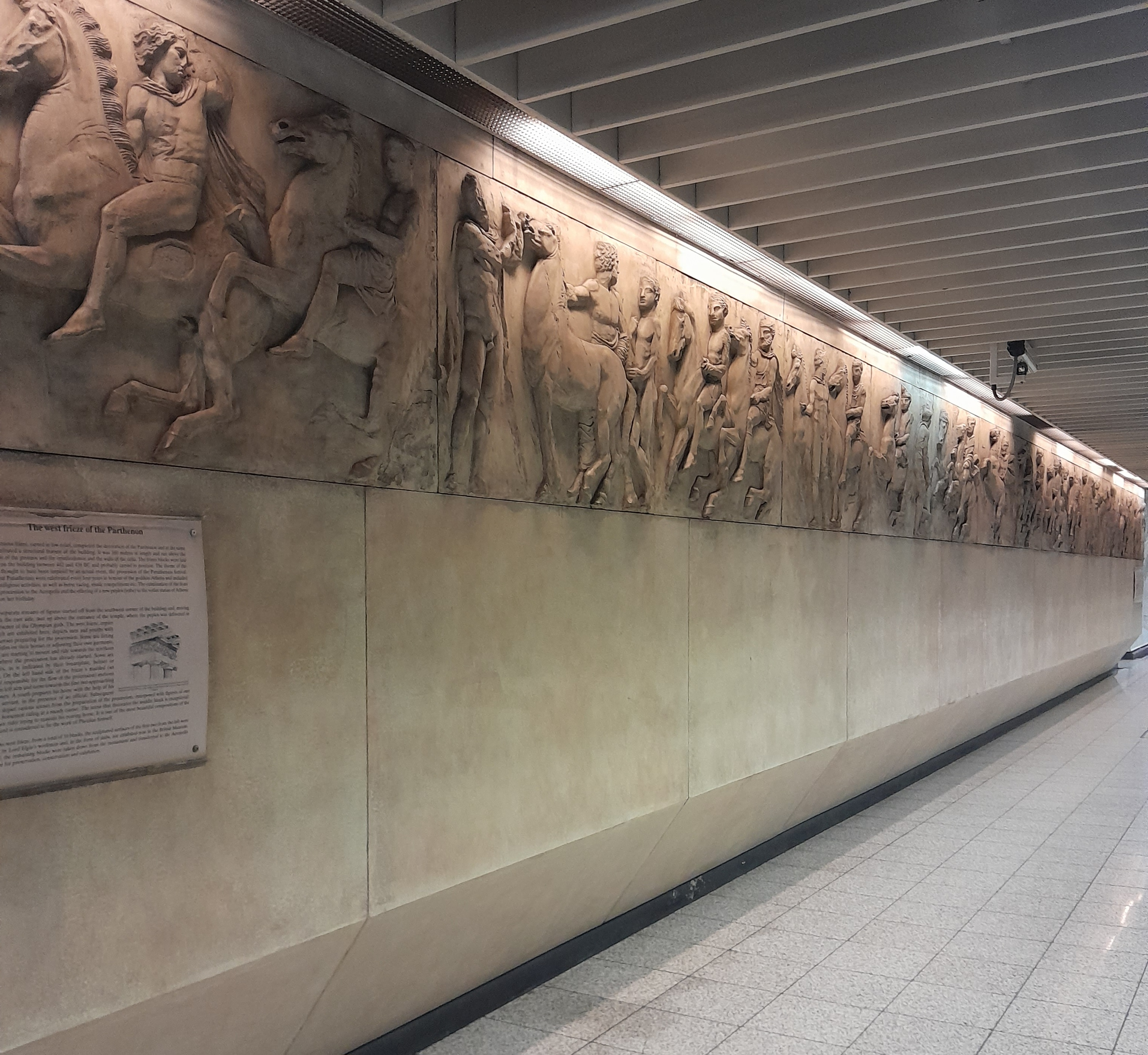
Reproduction of a part of the Parthenon's frieze, exhibited on the platforms. The original part of the frieze is exhibited at the British Museum as part of the Elgin Marbles.

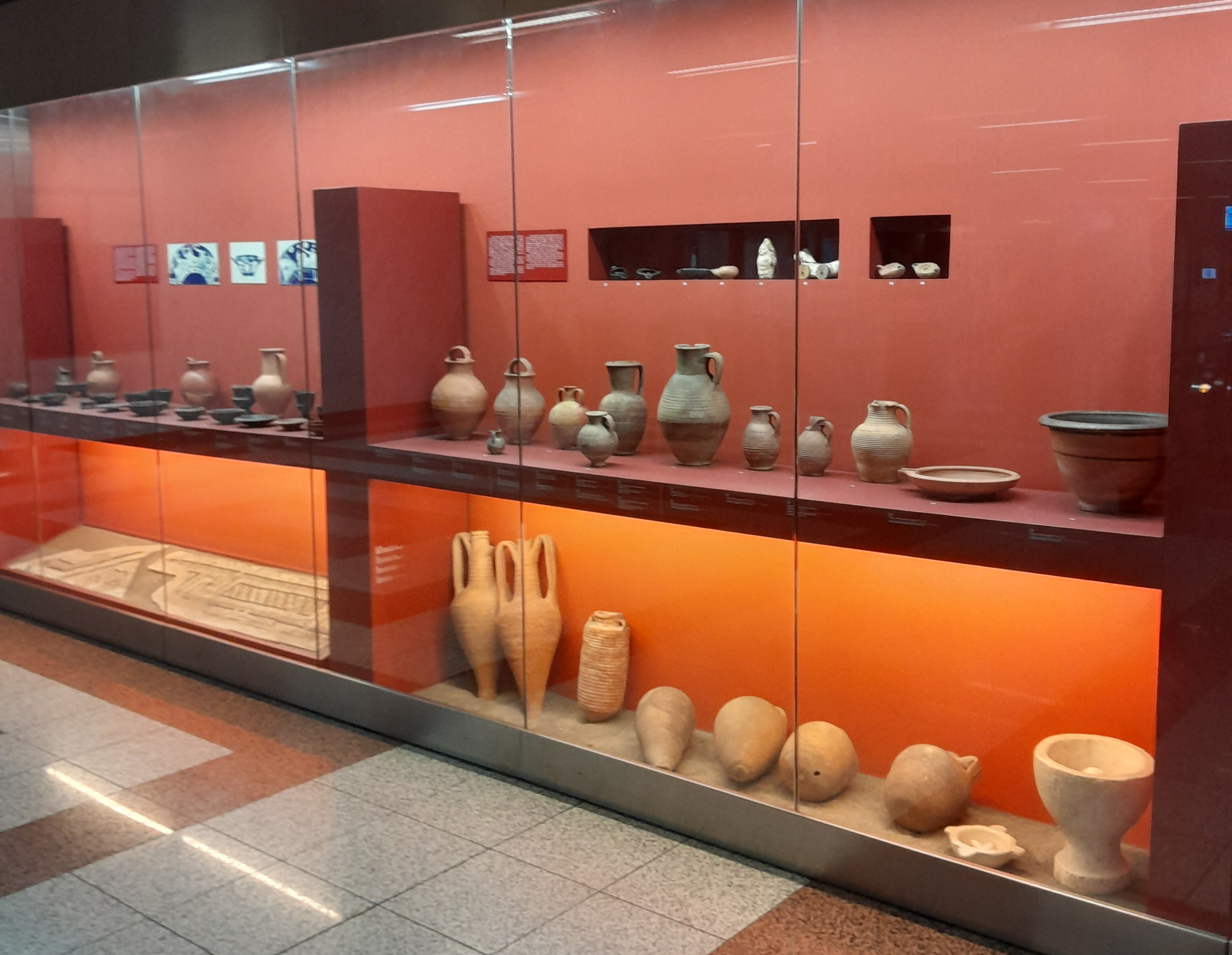
Ancient pottery discovered during construction, exhibited on the concourse level.

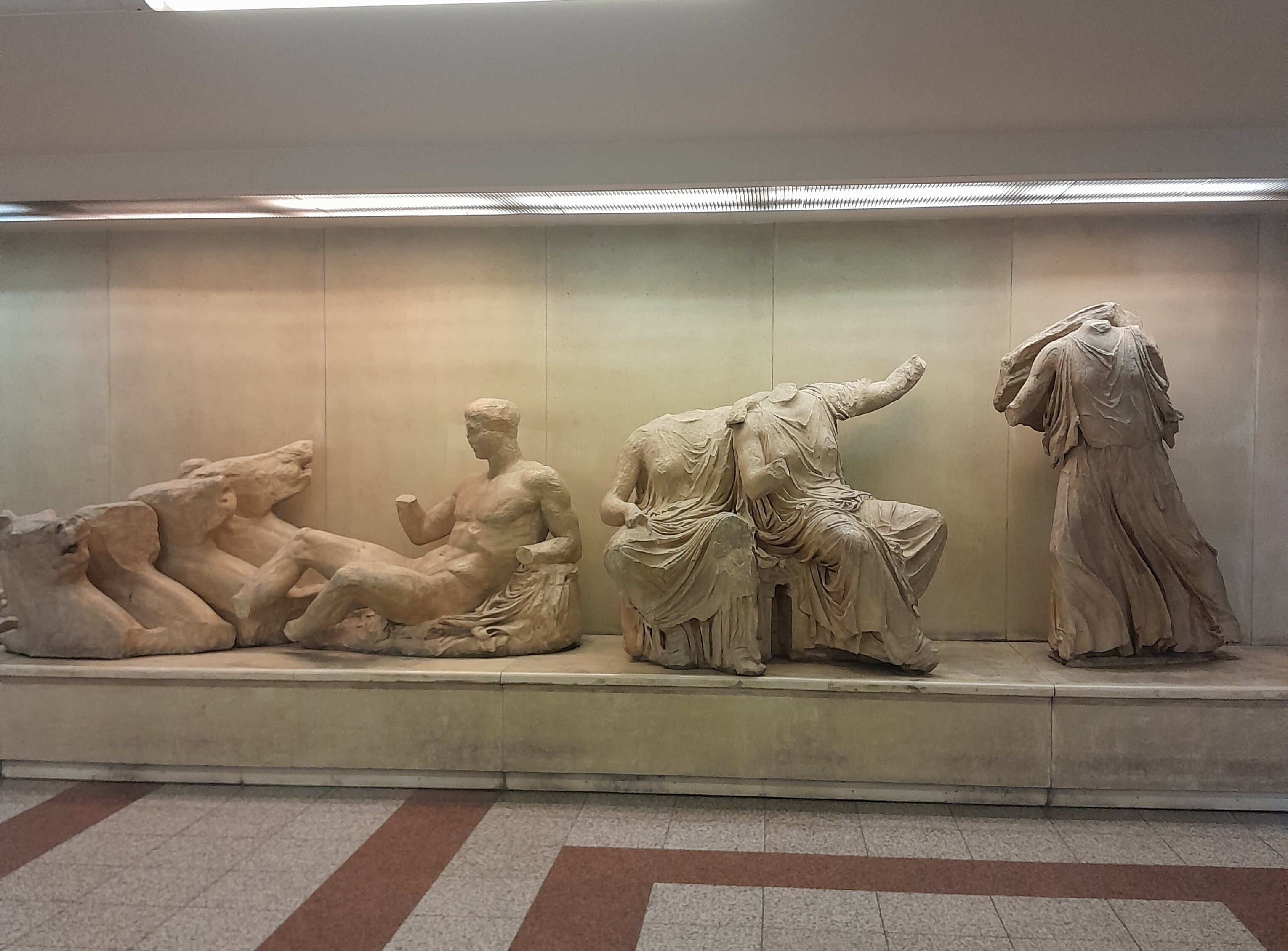
Sculptures exhibited on the concourse level. The sculptures depict Helios' chariot, Dionysus, Demeter, Persephone and Hebe or Artemis.

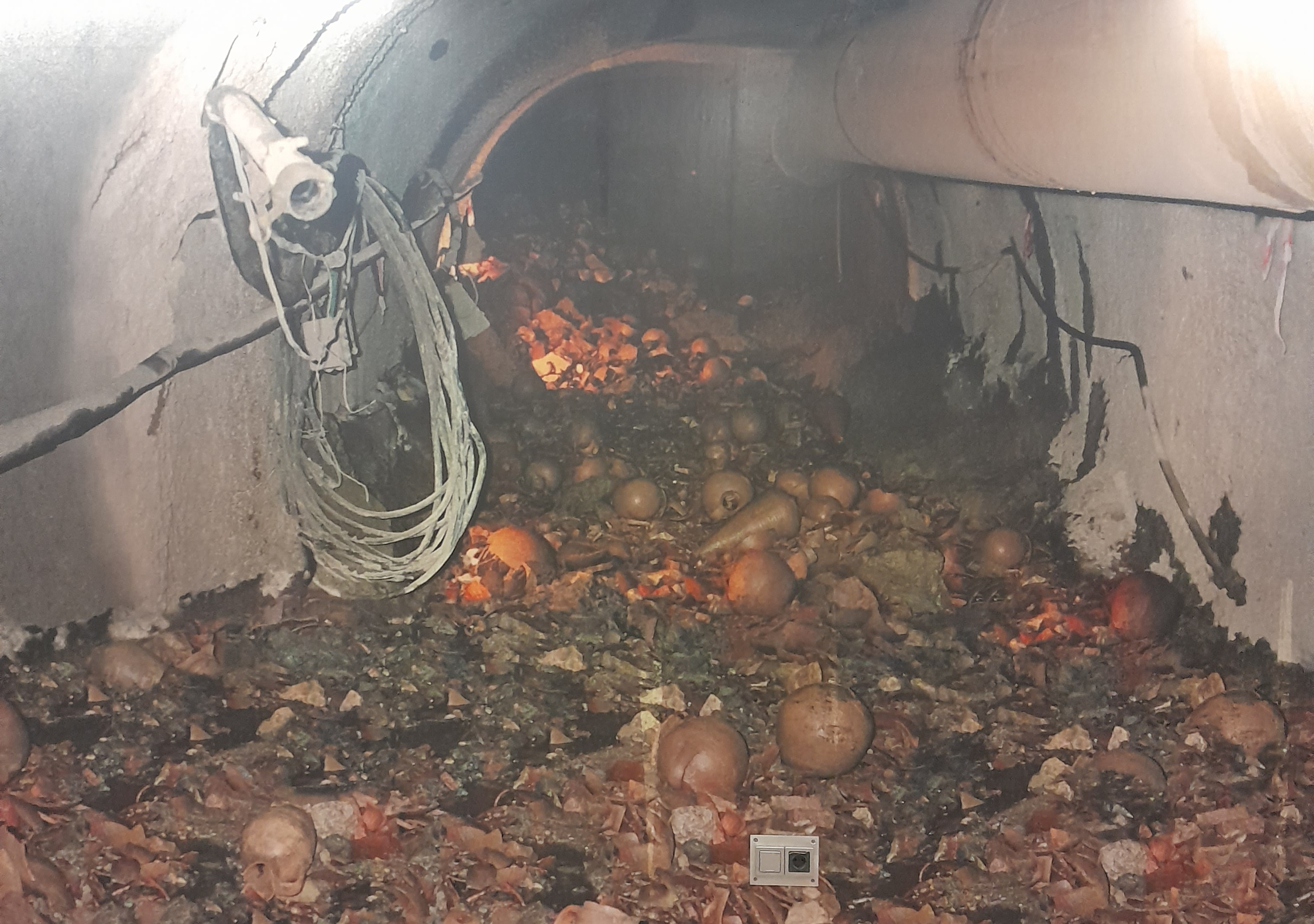
Picture from the building process of the station depicting several antiquities found during construction works, exhibited on the level that links the concourse and the platforms.

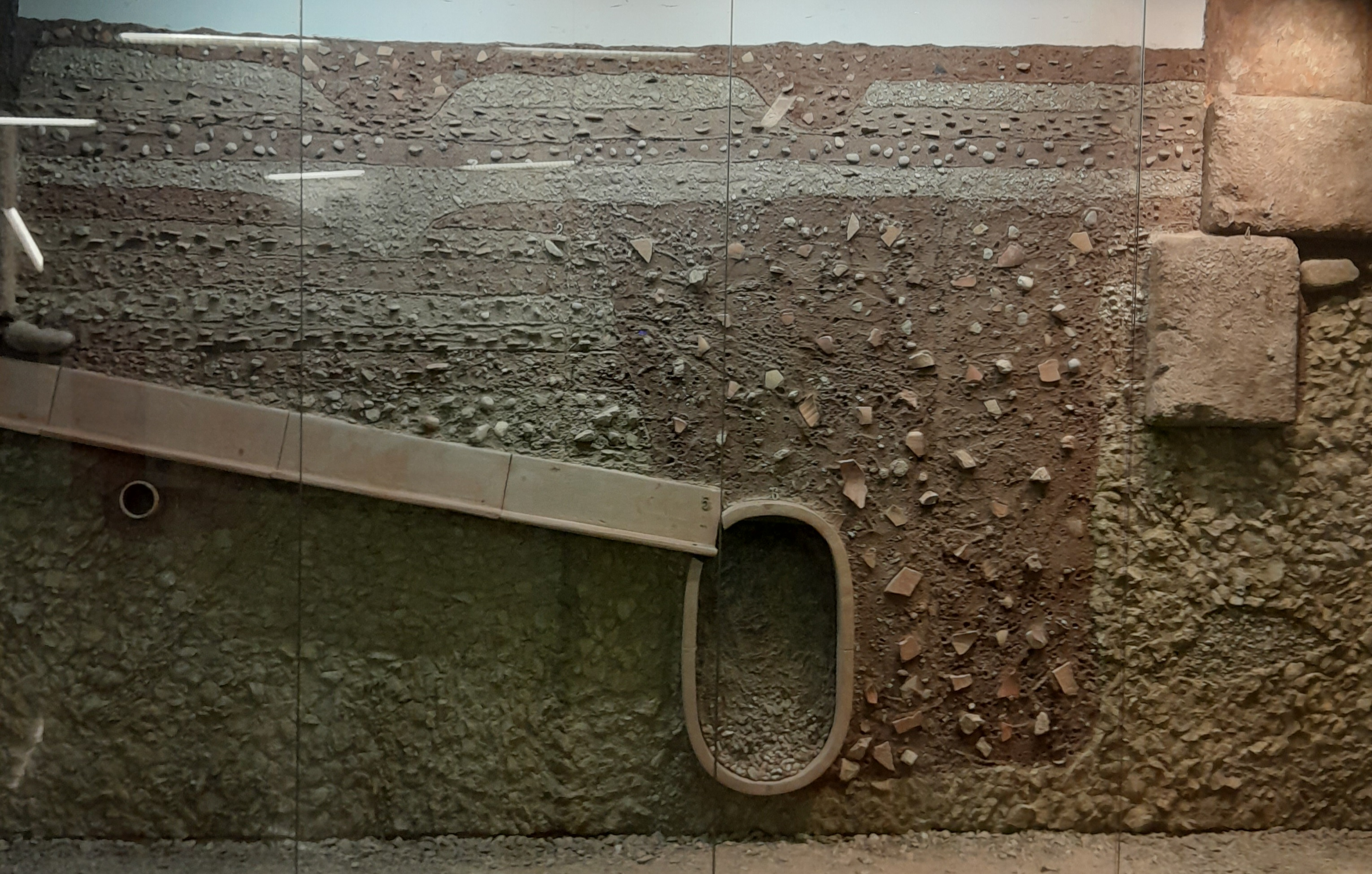
Archaeological section exhibited on the level that links the concourse and the platforms.

== Bus Connections ==
Only stops that are within 200m from any of the station's exits are listed. Special bus routes are not included.

Stop	Route		Coordinates
Stop	Number	Destination	Coordinates
Makrygianni	1	Moschato	37.968005°N 23.730982°E
Makrygianni	5	Tzitzifies	37.968005°N 23.730982°E
Makrygianni	15	Petralona	37.968005°N 23.730982°E
Makrygianni	A2	Voula	37.968005°N 23.730982°E
Makrygianni	040	Piraeus	37.968005°N 23.730982°E
Makrygianni	230	Acropolis	37.968005°N 23.730982°E
Makrygianni	1	Attiki	37.967794°N 23.731065°E
Makrygianni	5	Lambrini	37.967794°N 23.731065°E
Makrygianni	15	El. Venizelou	37.967794°N 23.731065°E
Makrygianni	A2	Akadimia	37.967794°N 23.731065°E
Makrygianni	040	Syntagma	37.967794°N 23.731065°E
Makrygianni	230	Zografou	37.967794°N 23.731065°E

== Vandalism ==
On the night of March 4, 2020 a group of about 30 persons entered the station, spray-painted on the station's walls and sculptures and broke ticket-vending machines as a form of protest. The messages written on the walls included "EAT COPS NOT MEAT", "FIRE TO ALL PRISONS" and "HIT SEXISTES [sic]". The group tried to flee the scene by entering a passing train, the driver of which refused to leave before the police arrived. A total of 43 arrests were made for obstruction, criminal mischief and domestic disturbance.

== Nearby Points of Interest ==
- Acropolis of Athens
- Acropolis Museum
- Dionysiou Areopagitou Street
- Temple of Olympian Zeus
