= Syngrou–Fix station =

Athens Metro station and tram stop

Συγγρού–Φιξ Sygrou–Fix Φίξ Fix
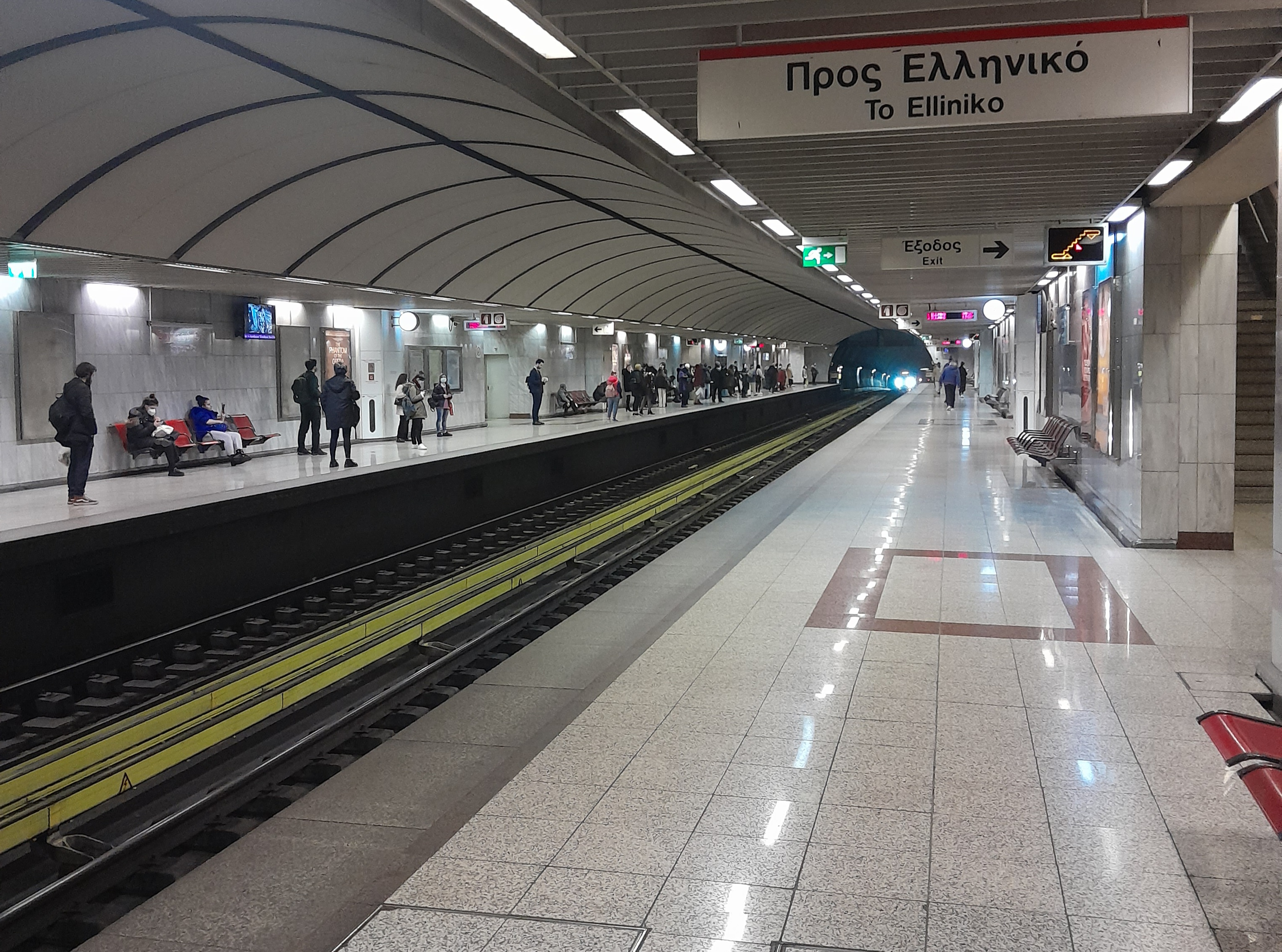
- Station platforms

General information
- Other names: Neos Kosmos
- Location: Koukaki and Neos Kosmos; Athens; Greece
- Coordinates: 37.964618°N 23.726802°E
- Manager: STASY
- Line: Athens Metro Line 2
- Platforms: 2 (Line 2); 2 (Tram)
- Tracks: 4
- Connections: Athens Tram Athens Tram Line 6

Construction
- Structure type: Underground (Line 2); At-grade (Tram)
- Platform levels: 2
- Parking: Yes
- Accessible: Yes

Key dates
- 15 November 2000: Metro station opened
- 19 July 2004: Tram stop opened
- 19 October 2018: Tram stop closed
- 20 November 2020: Tram stop reopened

Services
Preceding station	Athens Metro	Following station
Acropolis towards Anthoupoli	Line 2	Neos Kosmos towards Elliniko
Preceding station	Athens Tram	Following station
Leoforos Vouliagmenis towards Syntagma	Line 6	Kasomouli towards Pikrodafni
Location

Syngrou–Fix (Greek: Συγγρού–Φιξ), also known as Sygrou–Fix on metro station signage, is an interchange station between Athens Metro Line 2 and the Athens Tram. The station serves Koukaki and Neos Kosmos. The station name is derived from Syngrou Avenue, where it is located, and the former Fix brewery, which was on the road near the station site.

== History ==
The station is part of the original Athens Metro project that was funded in 1991. During the first stages of construction it was named Neos Kosmos (the subsequent Neos Kosmos station was then named Analatos). The station opened on 15 November 2000 along with the Syntagma-Dafni extension, 10 months after the first section of the system had opened.

== Location ==
The station is located along Syngrou Avenue, on the border of Koukaki and Neos Kosmos. In the location of the station, Syngrou is in real close proximity to Kallirrois street, the covered riverbed of Ilissos. One of the station's exits is located along Drakou street, a central pedestrian street of Koukaki in a neighbourhood called Gargaretta.

== Station Description ==
The station can be accessed by two ground-level entrances. One is located on the corner of Syngrou Ave. and Drakou Str. in Koukaki, while the other is on the median of Syngrou Ave. and Kallirrois Str., in a small square called 1996 Olympic Winners' Park. Both entrances lead to the concourse level. The concourse level can also be accessed from a side door that leads to the station's park & ride facility. The concourse level's walls are covered with polished marble tiles. The station's concourse level is one of only two in the system (the other being in Agios Antonios) that contain a small number of shops. Four escalators lead from the concourse level to the platforms. The platform level is decorated with polished marble tiles and is almost identical to Line 2's Syntagma and Line 3's Evangelismos and Megaro Mousikis stations.

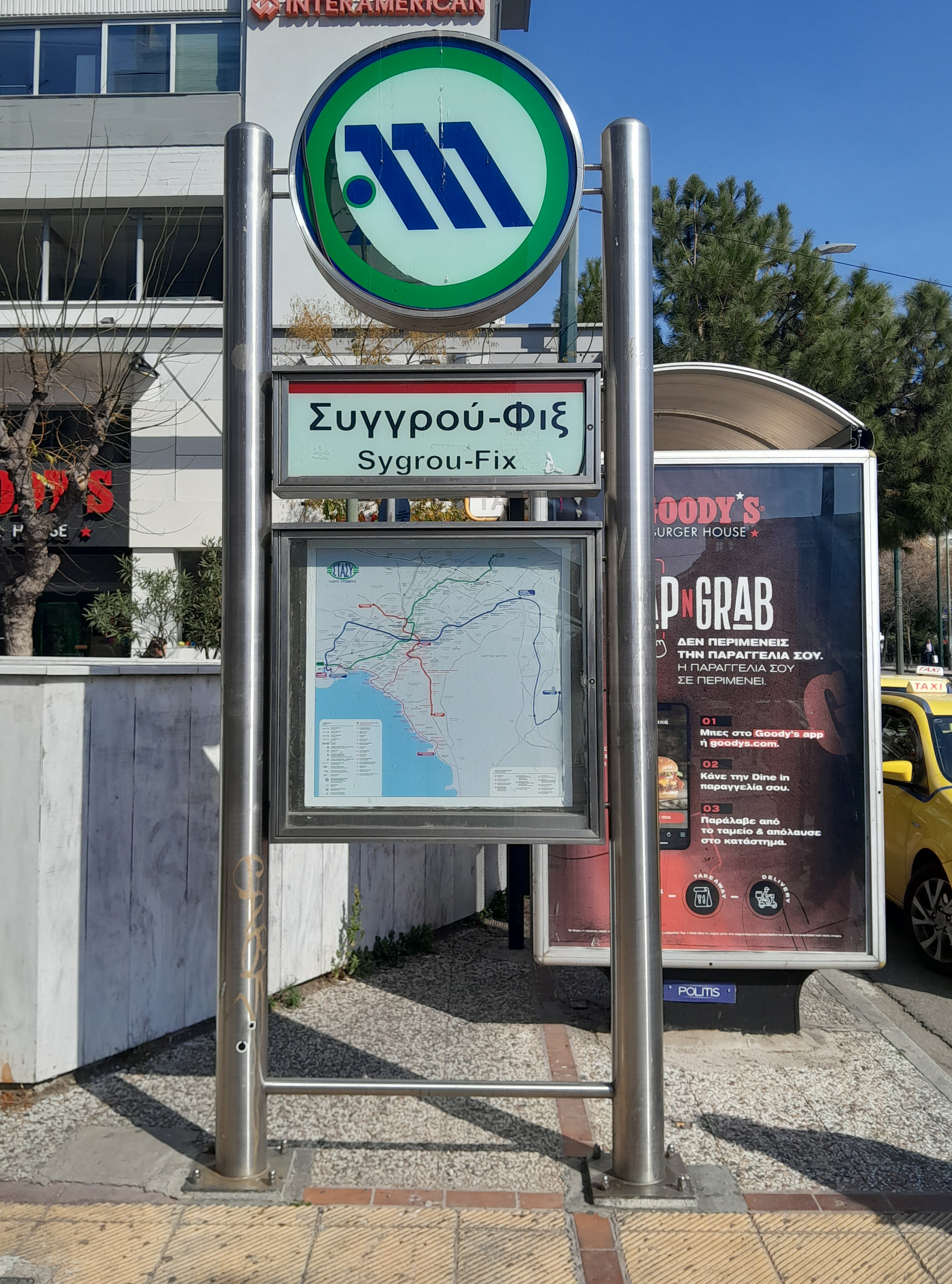
Sign on Syngrou Avenue

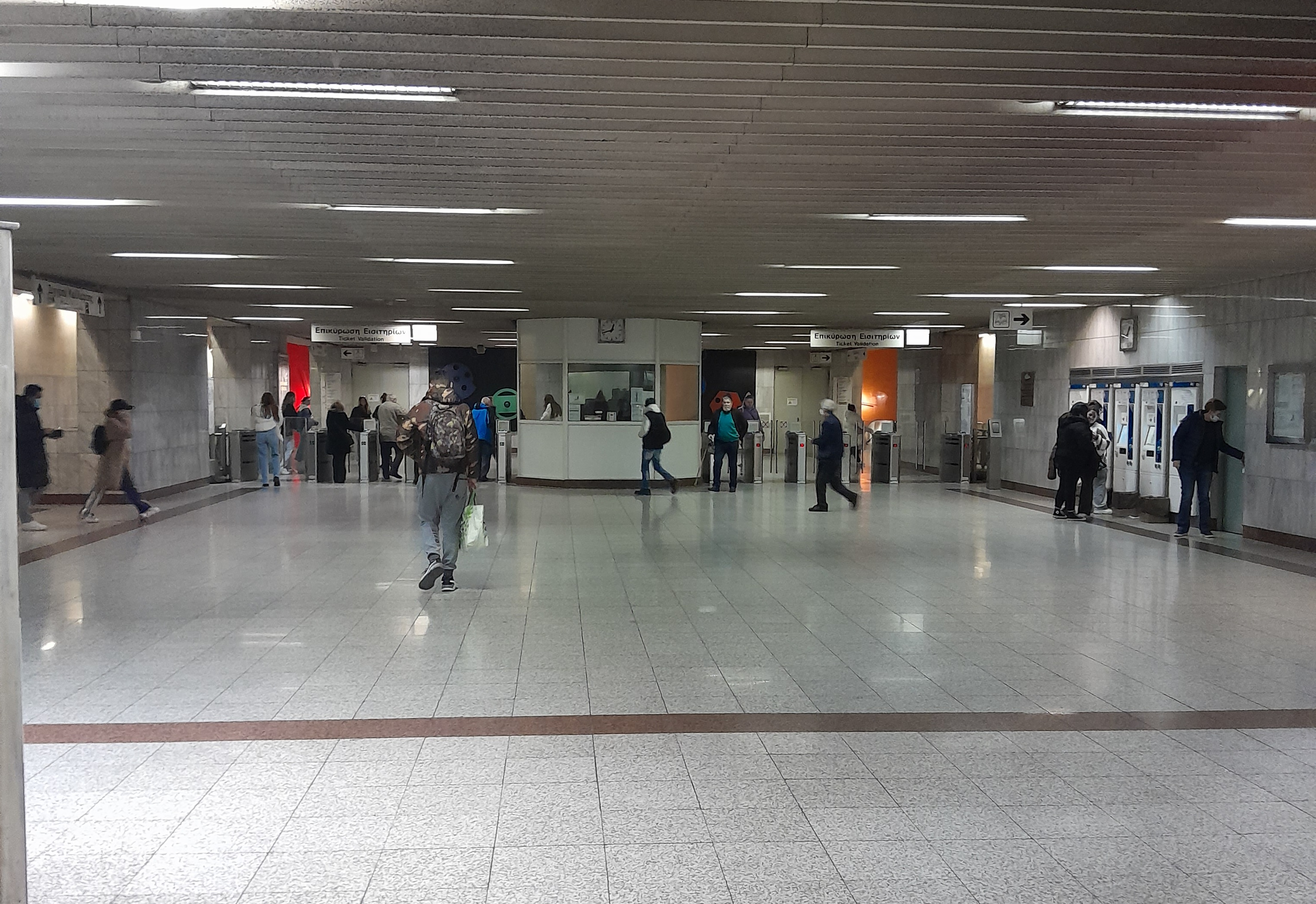
The station's concourse level

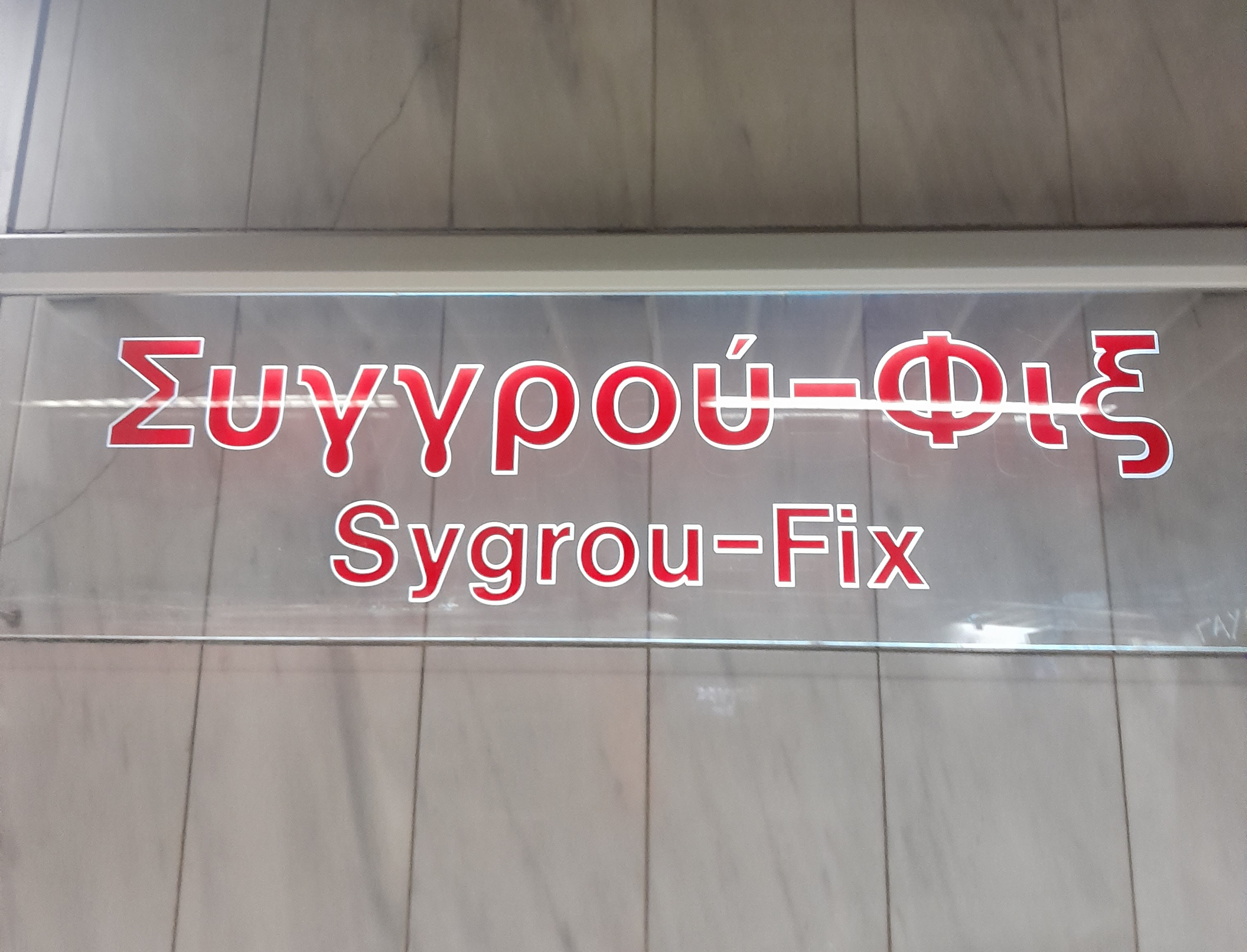
Station's sign on the platforms

== Exits ==
Exit	Location	Image	Accessibility	Coordinates
	Syggrou Ave./Kallirrois Str.			37.964433°N 23.726842°E
	Drakou Str.			37.964856°N 23.726692°E

== Station layout ==
Level; L1	Side platform, doors open on the right
Level; L1	Platform 3	← towards Syntagma (Leoforos Vouliagmenis)
Level; L1	Platform 4	towards Pikrodafni (Kasomouli) →
Level; L1	Side platform, doors will open on the right
Kallirois Avenue
G Ground	-	Exits
C Concourse	Concourse	Customer Service, Tickets
Level; L4	Side platform, doors will open on the right
Level; L4	Platform 1	← towards Anthoupoli (Acropolis)
Level; L4	Platform 2	towards Elliniko (Neos Kosmos) →
Level; L4	Side platform, doors will open on the right

== Exhibits ==
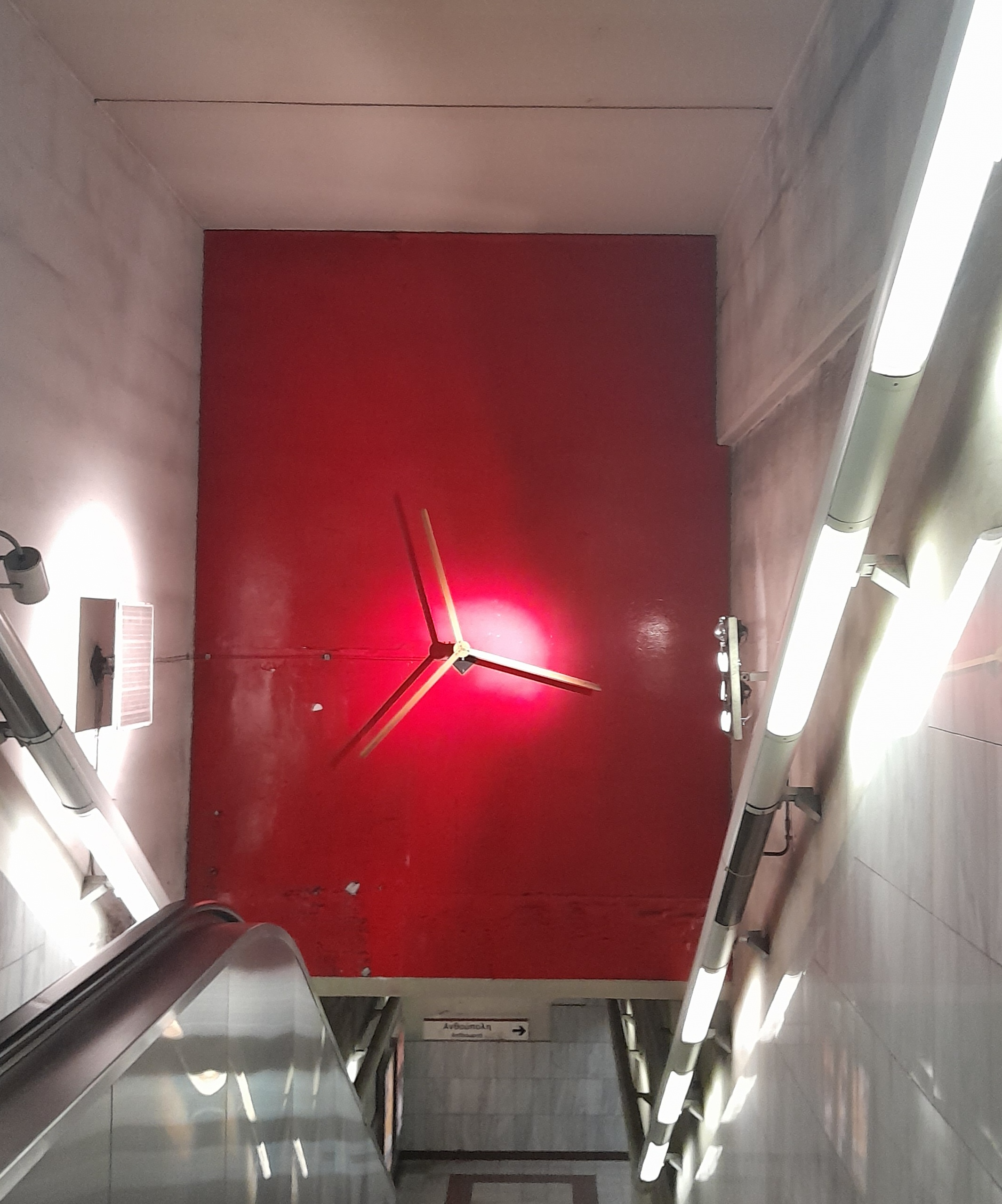
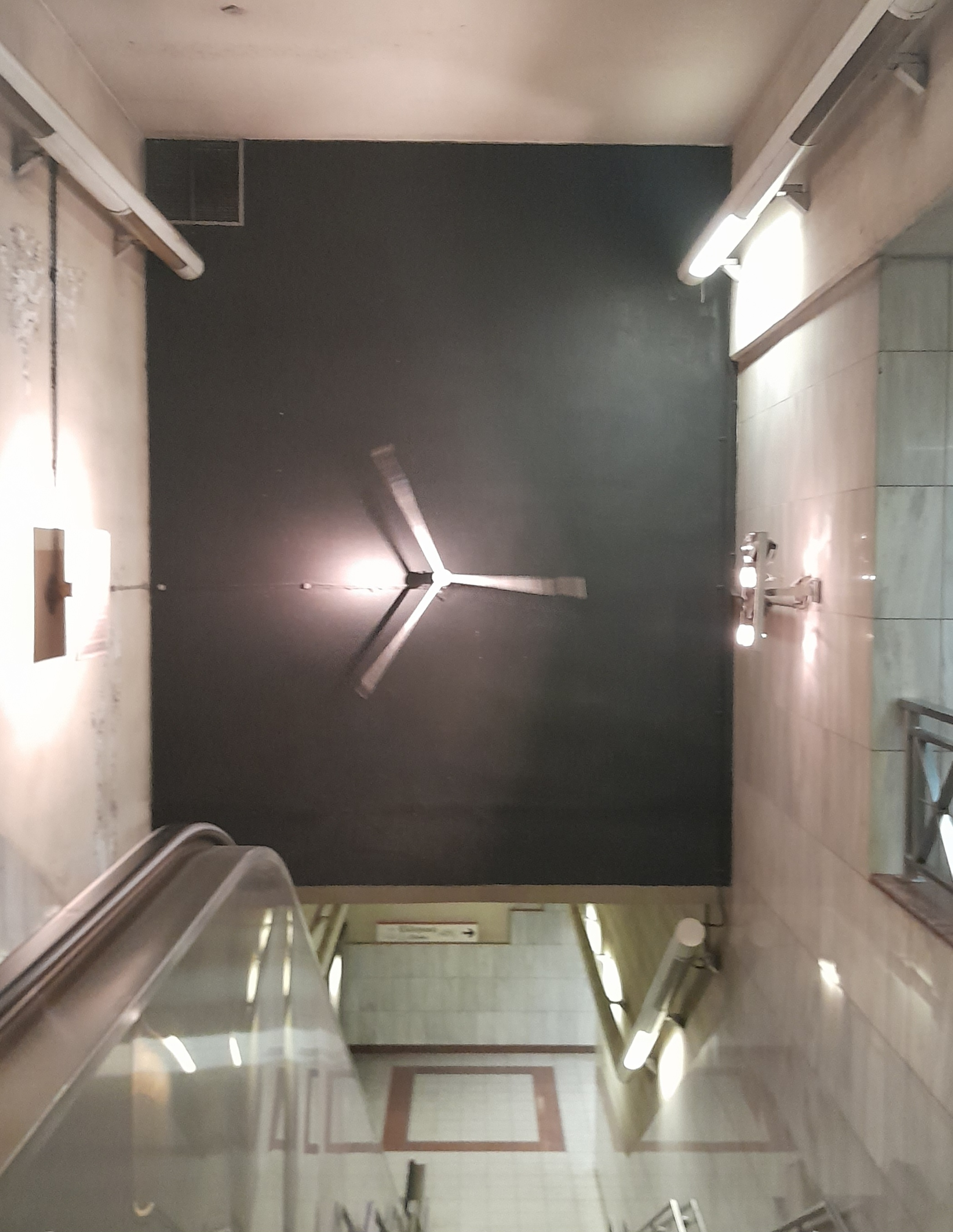
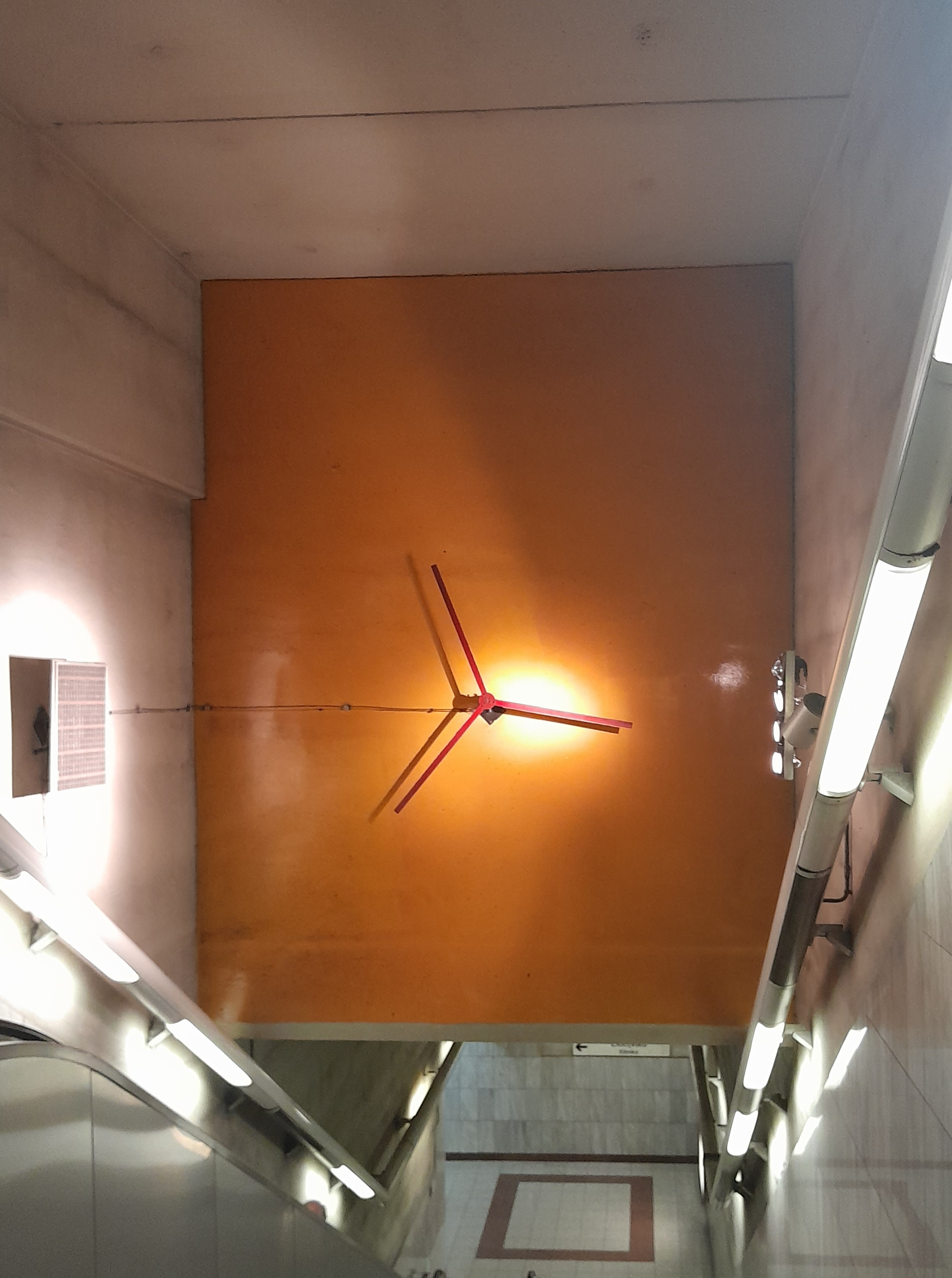
Photovoltaic Energy by Takis, exhibited on the escalators that lead to the platforms.

== Tram stop ==
The tram stop is simply known as Fix (Greek: Φίξ), and is located on the northeastern side of the road junction with Kallirois Avenue and Irakleous Street. Since 6 December 2021, Fix serves Line 6 of the Athens Tram.

Fix opened on 19 July 2004, as part of the initial network for the 2004 Summer Olympics in Athens. The tram stop (along with Syntagma, Zappio and Leoforos Vouliagmenis) was closed from 19 October 2018 to 20 November 2020, due to concerns over subsidence in the underground riverbed of the Ilisos.

== Bus Connections ==
Since 2011, Syngrou-Fix serves as a hub for local buses of the south suburbs. Only stops that are within 200m. from any of the station's exits are listed. Special bus routes are not included. In addition to OASA buses, private buses that link the station with the SNFCC also operate.

Stop	Route		Coordinates
Stop	Number	Destination	Coordinates
Syngrou-Fix Station	10	Tzitzifies	37.964480°N 23.726451°E
Syngrou-Fix Station	A2	Voula	37.964480°N 23.726451°E
Syngrou-Fix Station	040	Piraeus	37.964480°N 23.726451°E
Syngrou-Fix Station	550	Palaio Faliro	37.964480°N 23.726451°E
Syngrou-Fix Station	10	Halandri	37.964520°N 23.726858°E
Syngrou-Fix Station	A2	Akadimia	37.964520°N 23.726858°E
Syngrou-Fix Station	040	Syntagma	37.964520°N 23.726858°E
Syngrou-Fix Station	550	Kifissia	37.964520°N 23.726858°E
Fix	106	Palaio Faliro	37.964501°N 23.726953°E
Fix	126	Palaio Faliro	37.964501°N 23.726953°E
Fix	136	Nea Smyrni	37.964501°N 23.726953°E
Fix	137	Nea Smyrni	37.964501°N 23.726953°E
Afetiria	B2	Agios Kosmas	37.963401°N 23.726038°E
Afetiria	910	Tzitzifies	37.963401°N 23.726038°E
Gargaretta	1	Attiki	37.965645°N 23.726302°E
Gargaretta	5	Lambrini	37.965645°N 23.726302°E
Gargaretta	15	El. Venizelou	37.965645°N 23.726302°E
Gargaretta	1	Moschato	37.965782°N 23.725151°E
Gargaretta	5	Tzitzifies	37.965782°N 23.725151°E
Gargaretta	15	Petralona	37.965782°N 23.725151°E

== Nearby Points of Interest ==
- National Museum of Contemporary Art, former building of the Fix brewery.
