= Neos Kosmos station =

Athens Metro station and tram stop

Νέος Κόσμος Neos Kosmos
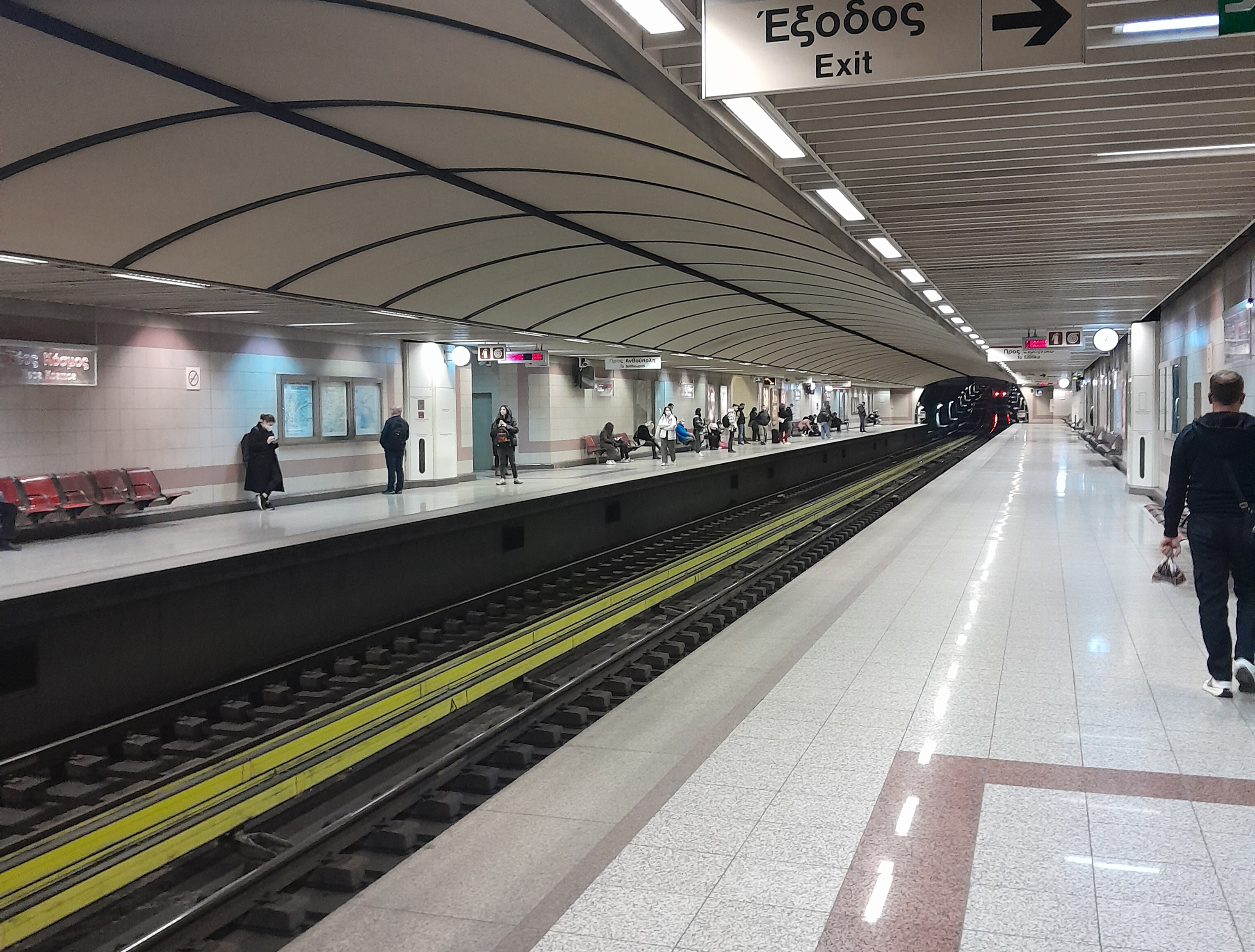
- Station platforms

General information
- Other names: Analatos
- Location: Athens; Greece
- Coordinates: 37.957750°N 23.728058°E
- Manager: STASY
- Line: Athens Metro Line 2
- Platforms: 2 (Line 2); 2 (Tram)
- Tracks: 4
- Connections: Athens Tram Athens Tram Line 6

Construction
- Structure type: Underground (Line 2); At-grade (Tram)
- Platform levels: 2
- Accessible: Yes

Key dates
- 15 November 2000: Metro station opened
- 19 July 2004: Tram stop opened

Services
Preceding station	Athens Metro	Following station
Syngrou–Fix towards Anthoupoli	Line 2	Agios Ioannis towards Elliniko
Preceding station	Athens Tram	Following station
Kasomouli towards Syntagma	Line 6	Baknana towards Pikrodafni
Location

Neos Kosmos (Greek: Νέος Κόσμος) is an interchange station between Athens Metro Line 2 and the Athens Tram. The metro station opened on 15 November 2000, as part of the extension from Syntagma to Dafni, and the tram stop opened on 19 July 2004 as part of the initial scheme.

== History ==
The station is part of the original Athens Metro project that was funded in 1991. During the first stages of construction it was named Analatos (Syngrou-Fix station was then named Neos Kosmos). The station opened on 15 November 2000 along with the Syntagma-Dafni extension, 10 months after the first section of the system had opened.

== Exits ==
Exit	Location	Image	Accessibility	Coordinates
	Ilia Iliou Str.			37.957603°N 23.728455°E
	Efstr. Pissa Str.			37.958066°N 23.727725°E

== Station layout ==
Level; L1	Platform 3	← towards Syntagma (Kasomouli)
Level; L1	Side platform, doors will open on the left
Kasomouli Street
Level; L2	Platform 4	→ towards Pikrodafni (Baknana) →
Level; L2	Side platform, doors will open on the right
Kasomouli Street
G Ground	-	Exits
C Concourse	Concourse	Customer Service, Tickets
Level; L3	Side platform, doors will open on the right
Level; L3	Platform 1	← towards Anthoupoli (Syngrou–Fix)
Level; L3	Platform 2	→ towards Elliniko (Agios Ioannis) →
Level; L3	Side platform, doors will open on the right
