= Andrea Syngrou Avenue =

Central avenue in Athens, Greece

- Λεωφόρος Ανδρέα Συγγρού

Route information
- Length: 6.23 km (3.87 mi)
- Existed: 1883–present

Major junctions
- South end: Poseidonos Avenue, Palaio Faliro 37°56′16″N 23°41′35″E
- North end: Amalias Avenue, downtown Athens 37°58′6″N 23°43′54″E

Location
- Country: Greece
- Major cities: Palaio Faliro, Kallithea, Nea Smyrni, Downtown Athens

Highway system
- Highways in Greece; Motorways; National Roads

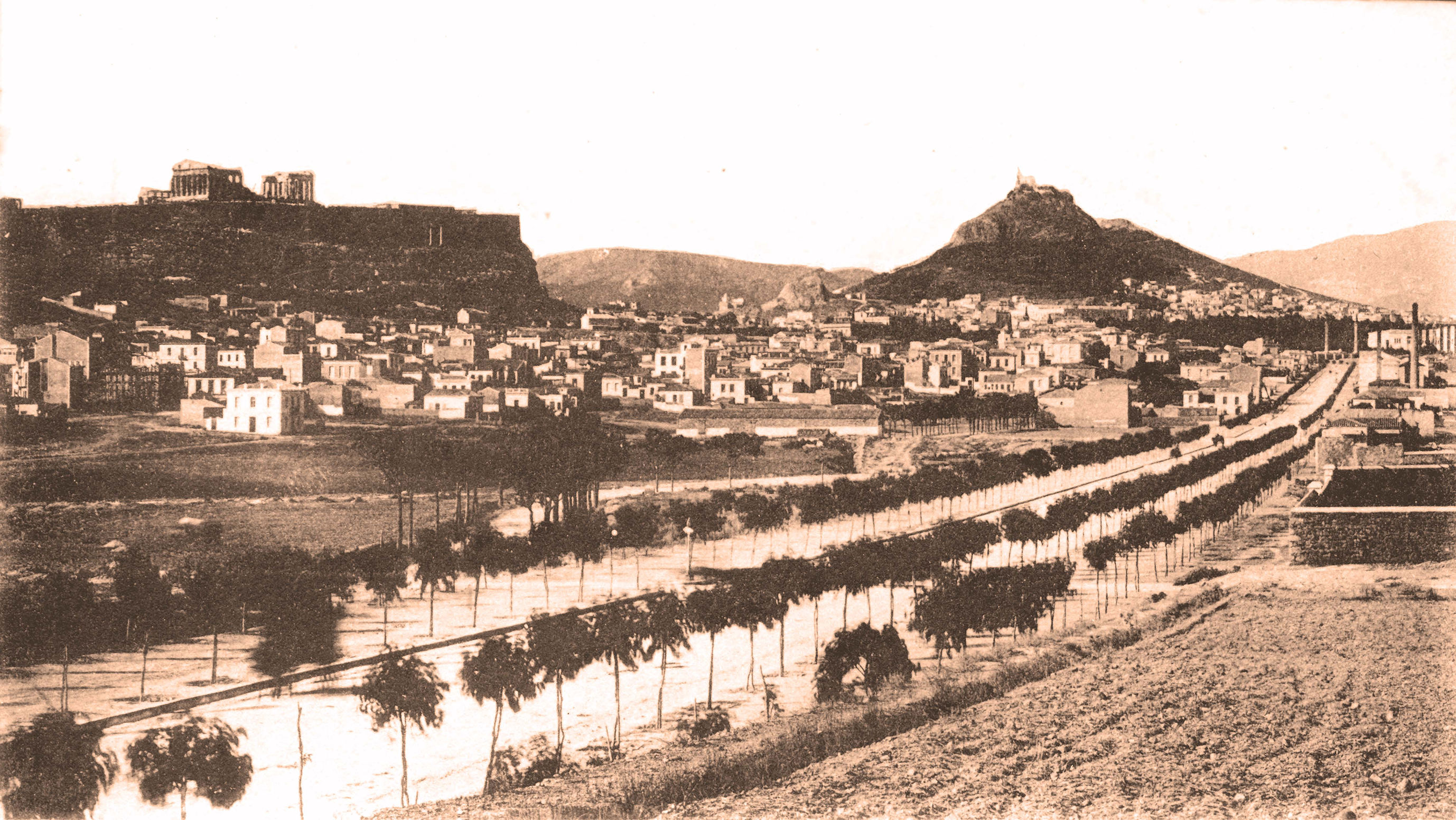
Syngrou in 1890

Andrea Syngrou Avenue (Greek: Λεωφόρος Ανδρέα Συγγρού, romanized: Leōfóros Andréa Syggroú) is a major road in Athens, linking the city centre with Poseidonos Avenue near the Bay of Faliro. It was planned and built by, and later named for, Andreas Syngros. It runs southwest to northeast. The Syngrou–Fix station of the Athens Metro's Red Line is situated near the northeastern end of the avenue. The avenue passes through the municipalities of Palaio Faliro, Kallithea, and Nea Smyrni, as well as the Municipality of Athens. The avenue is home to many hotels and functions as one of Athens' various central business districts, due to being home to many company headquarters

Name	Destinations	Notes
Athens		
Kallirrois		
Lagoumitzi		
Nea Smyrni Kallithea A		
Nea Smyrni Kallithea B		
Nea Smyrni Kallithea C		
Amfitheas		
Delta Falirou		
National Road		

== See also ==
- Onassio Cardiac Surgery Centre
