= Syntagma metro station =

Athens Metro station and tram stop

Σύνταγμα Syntagma
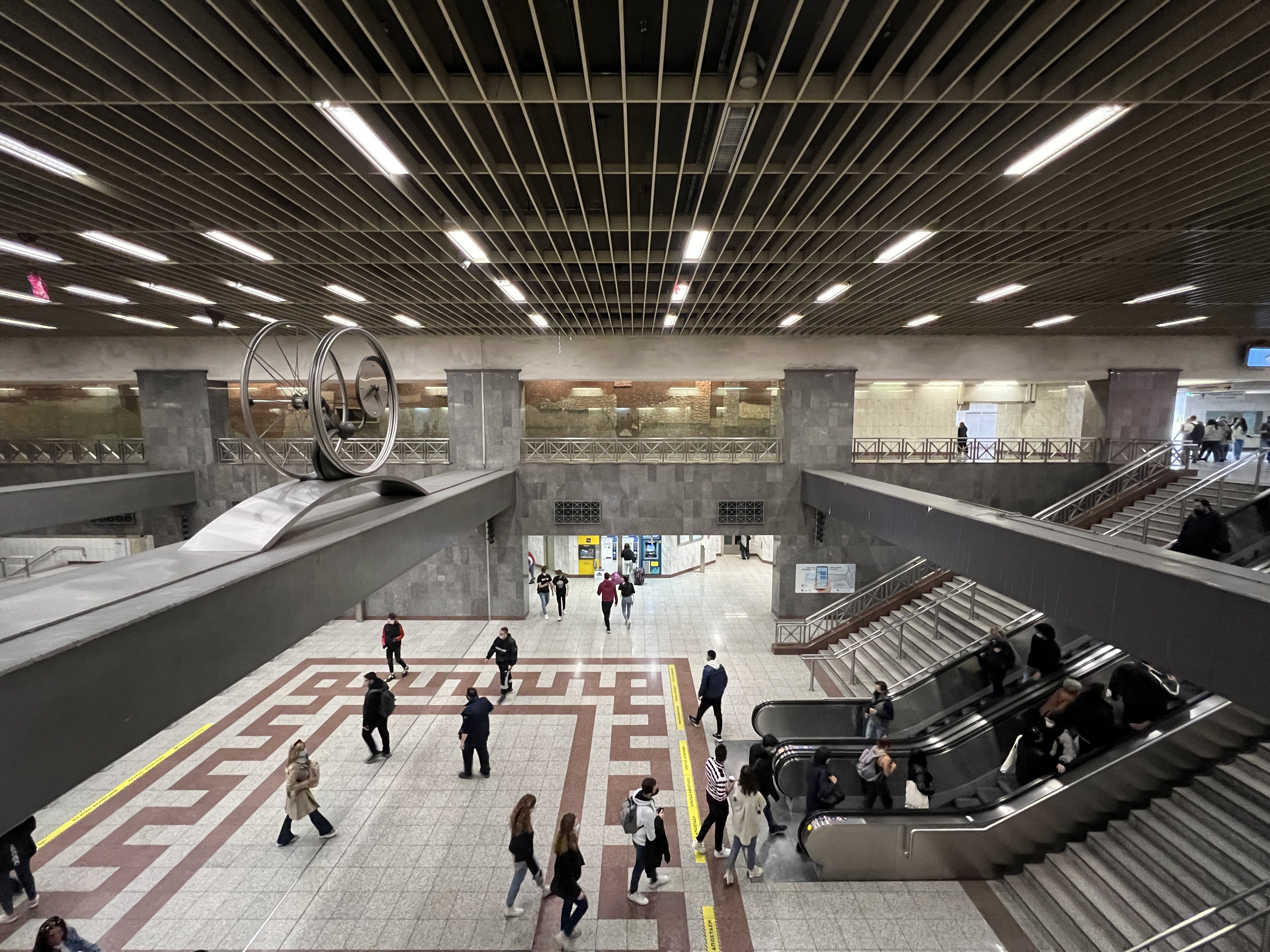
- Station ticket hall

General information
- Location: Syntagma Square, Athens; Greece
- Coordinates: 37°58′31″N 23°44′07″E
- Manager: STASY
- Line: Athens Metro Athens Metro Line 2 Athens Metro Line 3
- Platforms: 2 (Metro Line 2); 2 (Metro Line 3); 2 (Tram)
- Tracks: 2 (Metro Line 2); 2 (Metro Line 3); 2 (Tram)
- Connections: Athens Tram Athens Tram Line 6

Construction
- Structure type: Underground (Metro); Street level (Tram)
- Platform levels: 3
- Accessible: Yes

Key dates
- 28 January 2000: Metro station opened
- 19 July 2004: Tram stop opened

Services
Preceding station	Athens Metro	Following station
Panepistimio towards Anthoupoli	Line 2	Acropolis towards Elliniko
Monastiraki towards Dimotiko Theatro	Line 3	Evangelismos towards Athens Airport
Preceding station	Athens Tram	Following station
Terminus	Line 6	Zappeion towards Pikrodafni
Location

Syntagma (Greek: Σύνταγμα, lit. 'Constitution') is a station on the Athens Metro, located at Syntagma Square in the center of Athens, Greece. It serves as the transfer point between Line 3, Line 2 and the Athens Tram. When the Metro first opened, on 28 January 2000, the station was the terminal station for both the new lines. The centerpiece of the city's metro network, it is a transportation hub for buses and the northern terminal for the Tram. It is the busiest station in the Athens transport system, located underneath Syntagma Square, the political centre of Athens. It serves Ermou Street (the main shopping street in the historic centre), the Old Royal Palace, various government agencies, foreign embassies and the National Garden.

Several of the architecture works were erected by Thodoros Papadimitriou, a famous sculptor. The station also includes a large archeological exhibition.

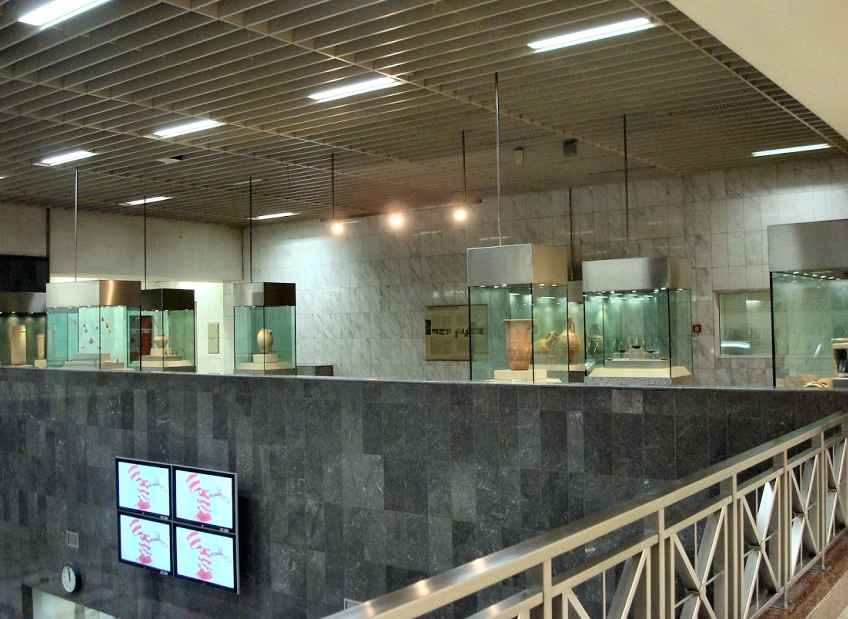
The museum of Syntagma metro station

== Tram stop ==
The tram stop of the same name is located south of Syntagma Square, adjacent to Vasilissis Amalias Avenue: it opened on 19 July 2004, as part of the initial scheme for the 2004 Summer Olympics. The tram stop was a single-track terminus with a side platform until 10 December 2018, and reopened on 14 March 2019 with a dual-track layout and an island platform. However, the tram stop (along with Zappio, Leoforos Vouliagmenis and Fix) was closed again from 19 October 2018 to 20 November 2020, due to concerns over subsidence in the underground riverbed of the Ilisos.

Since 6 December 2021, the tram stop serves Line 6 of the Athens Tram (from Pikrodafni in Kalamaki, South Athens). The tram stop previously served Lines 4 and 5.

== Station layout ==
Level; L1	Platform 5	← towards Pikrodafni (Zappeion)
Level; L1	Island platform, doors will open on the left, right
Level; L1	Platform 6	← towards Pikrodafni (Zappeion)
G Ground	-	Exits
Level; L2	Stores	Charity bazaars, ATMs
C Concourse	Concourse	Customer Service, Tickets
Level; L4	Side platform, doors will open on the right
Level; L4	Platform 1	← towards Anthoupoli (Panepistimio)
Level; L4	Platform 2	towards Elliniko (Acropolis) →
Level; L4	Side platform, doors will open on the right
Level; L5	Side platform, doors will open on the right
Level; L5	Platform 3	← towards Dimotiko Theatro (Monastiraki)
Level; L5	Platform 4	towards Athens Airport (Evangelismos) →
Level; L5	Side platform, doors will open on the right

== Exits ==
Exit	Location	Image	Accessibility	Coordinates
	Syntagma Sq.			
	Syntagma Sq.			
	Amalias Ave.			
	Panepistimiou Ave.			
	Grande Bretagne Hotel			

== Cultural works ==
- George Zoggolopoulos: Atrium (a ceiling installation by the front of the eastbound Line 3 platform)
- Theodoros, sculptor http://www.theodoros.net/ergo/ergomain.htm : The Metro Clock, 2001 (at the main hall)
