= Exarcheia Self-Organized Health Structure =

Social solidarity initiative for medical care

Exarcheia Self-Organized Health Structure is a social solidarity initiative in Exarcheia neighborhood of Athens with the aim of providing medical care to people who need it. It is located in Κ*ΒΟΞ, a squatted building near Exarcheia square.

On 21 April 2012, the building (which was neglected and not hosting any service) was captured by anarchists with the aim to transform it in a self-organized social center. Police tried to stop the capture of the building, but anarchists, helped by the residents of the neighborhood (which is known for its anti-authoritarian character), removed the metal sheets placed over the exterior by the police and the opening of the squat continued as planned.

The structure is staffed by doctors of several specializations, psychologists, nurses, pharmacists and non-expert residents of the area (for the non-medical functions of the structure). All services are offered free of charge.

Decisions are taken by an open assembly with means of direct democracy. The structure has an anti-establishment character and distinguishes itself from charity.
