= Merry Crisis =

Political slogan from the 2008 Civil Unrest in Greece

"Merry Crisis" or "Merry Crisis and a Happy New Fear" is a slogan that appeared as graffiti in Athens during the 2008 Civil Unrest in Greece.

Earlier, a picture of such graffiti appeared on the cover of Vavel magazine's 2007 Christmas special. The British anarchist publication Occupied London states that it was "one of the main slogans of the 2008 revolt."

== Background ==
On 6 December 2008, Alexandros Grigoropoulos, a fifteen-year-old boy, was killed by policemen in Exarcheia, a neighborhood of Athens. Within a few hours, protesters were in Athens marching, setting buildings on fire and building barricades. They targeted symbols of capitalism including banks, police stations, and the Christmas tree in Syntagma Square.

== Graffiti ==
During the 2008 riots, an unknown person spray-painted the phrase "Merry crisis and a happy new fear" outside the Bank of Greece in Athens.

== Legacy ==
Commentators of the riots describe the phrase as the motto of the riots.

== Other uses ==
During the 2019–20 Australian bushfire season, an artist created a mural in a Sydney suburb depicting Australian Prime Minister Scott Morrison making a toast. A speech bubble states, "Merry Crisis". Prints and t-shirts of the mural were sold to raise money for the Rural Fire Service.
