= Squatting in Syria =

Syria on globe

Map of Syria

Squatting in Syria is the occupation of unused land or derelict buildings without the permission of the owner. Archaeologists have found evidence of squatting at the ancient city of Tell Brak (in what is now Syria). Armenian refugees squatted in the 1920s and more recently informal settlements formed around cities such as Aleppo and the capital Damascus as people migrated from rural areas. The ongoing Syrian civil war which began in 2011 has displaced many people, some of whom squatted in Greece.

== History ==
The world's first cities were founded in Mesopotamia. The ancient city of Tell Brak (in what is now Syria) had suburban informal settlements by 4200 BC. Unlike in Uruk (in what is now Iraq), the urban growth at Tell Brak suggests to archaeologists that squatters expanded the city in a haphazard manner and these peripheral settlements eventually merged into the city.

In the 1920s, 40,000 Armenian refugees entered Lebanon and Syria from Turkey, mainly being housed in shanty towns. In the 1950s, there were squatters on the periphery of Homs in the 1950s and the Yarmouk Camp was set up in 1957 to house Palestinian refugees who had previously been squatting. Aysh Warrwar is a squatted area on the periphery of the capital Damascus which was established in the 1970s by internal migrants. From the 1980s onwards, people migrated from rural areas to the cities and lived in informal settlements on the periphery. The population of Aleppo grew to 2 million by 2005; in 2000, there were 22 settlements ringing Aleppo which made up almost half of the city. In the capital Damascus the authorities provided utilities to the new residential zones. Whilst poor, the squatters were mostly able to afford to build habitable structures and following the thinking of economist Hernando de Soto the state began to legalize the settlements, as mandated by Law 33 in 2008. At the same time, evictions enforced by the military also occurred, with an elderly woman being killed by a soldier in 2005 and three people dying in 2009.

== Civil war ==
The ongoing Syrian civil war which began in 2011 has displaced many Syrians, some of whom were housed in Athens refugee squats. By 2018, people who had fled were returning home to Syria from places such as Germany and Greece. In the meantime, internally displaced Syrians in Idlib Governorate had repurposed the stone ruins located in the Dead Cities to rebuild their livelihoods.
