= Rouvikonas =

Anarchist collective in Athens, Greece

- Ρουβίκωνας
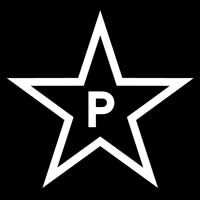
- Founded: 2013
- Country: Greece
- Headquarters: Themistokleous, Arachovis &, Athina Exarcheia Square
- Ideology: Anarchism
- Political position: Far-left
- Status: Active
- Size: c. 150 (2018)
- Part of: Greek anarchist movement
- Website: rouvikonas.gr

Rouvikonas (Greek: Ρουβίκωνας; English: Rubicon) is a Greek anarchist activist group based in Athens. It first emerged from the Greek anti-austerity movement and began taking action after a period of mass mobilisation ended. Its actions have largely consisted of symbolic acts of property damage, carried out against governmental and corporate offices in the Greek capital.

== Establishment ==
Following the events of the 2008 riots, Greek anarchist activists increasingly became involved in illegal actions, including squatting, property damage and social conflict with the Hellenic Police. Members of the Greek anti-austerity movement established Rouvikonas (English: Rubicon) in 2013, at the height of the Greek government-debt crisis. Rouvikonas organised the self-managed social center K-Vox, in Exarcheia Square, where they coordinate their activities. By 2018, the group counted between 120 and 150 members, many of whom were known to police as they had been arrested while taking protest actions.

== Actions ==
Following the 2015 Greek bailout referendum, mass mobilisations declined in Greece, giving way to illegal and even violent actions by groups such as Rouvikonas. To achieve social change, Rouvikonas adopted methods of action that have been considered violent by more moderate and non-violent sections of the Greek far-left such as DiEM25. In order to gain public support for anti-statism, Rouvikonas has largely engaged in symbolic acts of property damage against high-profile targets, rather than violently attacking individuals. This contrasts with Greek anarchist groups of the nihilist tendency, who have engaged in indiscriminate attacks without any regard for gaining public support. In the first five years of its existence, Rouvikonas carried out more than 50 attacks against governmental and corporate offices.

The group has often thrown paint at embassies, including those of Turkey in July 2016, Israel in November 2017, and the United States in January 2019. The group has also targeted Greek government offices. In July 2017, members scattered leaflets in the offices of the Bank of Greece; and in November of the same year, the group attacked the Ministry of National Defence, which provoked a political debate about the security of government offices. It continued carrying out small-scale attacks the following year, although their actions were overshadowed by rising far-right terrorism in the country.

In July 2019, Rouvikonas attacked the offices of Athens Voice, which had been widely criticised for its opposition to immigration; the publication characterised the attack as an example of a "hysteria" caused by "political correctness". In November 2019, the group vandalised the offices of Niki Kerameus, the Minister of Education, after the government repealed a law which had prohibited police from entering university campuses.

During the 2025 Tempi protests, the anarchist group Rouvikonas raided the offices of Hellenic Train and Raised a banner atop the building reading "Murderers". The group was sued by the company and its 25 members that participated in the raid faced trials but were all found innocent.

== Bibliography ==
- Chatzistavrou, Filippa (2018). "Mobilising for Democracy during Austerity in Greece". In Blockmans, Steven; Russack, Sophia (eds.). Direct Democracy in the EU: The Myth of a Citizens' Union. Rowman & Littlefield. pp. 253–284. ISBN 978-1-78660-997-7.
- Downes, James F.; Bruno, Valerio Alfonso; Chan, Edward (2023). "The Case of DiEM25: A Unique Transnational Political Movement in 21st-Century European Politics". In Orofino, Elisa; Allchorn, William (eds.). Routledge Handbook of Non-Violent Extremism: Groups, Perspectives and New Debates. Routledge. doi:10.4324/9781003032793-29. ISBN 9781003032793.
- Karlin, John Ryan (2021). "Dialogical encounter and the production of exilic space in Exarcheia". Anthropological Notebooks. 7 (3). ISSN 2232-3716.
- Karlin, John Ryan (2022). "Battles for Socio-Spatial Hegemony in the Exilic Space of Exarcheia". Antipode. 54 (4): 1112–1140. doi:10.1111/anti.12833.
- Kounalaki, Xenia (2021). "Migration and the Pandemic: Is Greece in Danger of Excessive Political Correctness?". In Angelidis, Dimitris; Kokkinaki, Fotini; Kounalaki, Xenia; Maragidou, Melpomeni; Papagiannakis, Lefteris; Sakellariou, Alexandros; Haramis, Pavlos (eds.). Borders and Coronavirus: Refugee Policy and Public Discourse in a time of a dual crisis in Greece (PDF) (Report). Friedrich Ebert Foundation. ISBN 9786188517615.
- Lubrano, Mauro (2024). "Hidden in Plain Sight: Insurrectionary Anarchism in the Anti-Government Extremism Landscape". Perspectives on Terrorism. 18 (1): 37–61. JSTOR 27301119.
- Mylonas, Harris (2018). "Greece: Political developments and data for 2017". European Journal of Political Research Political Data. 57 (1): 121–128. doi:10.1111/2047-8852.12201.
- Mylonas, Harris (2019). "Greece: Political developments and data in 2018". European Journal of Political Research Political Data. 58 (1): 113–122. doi:10.1111/2047-8852.12241.
- Poulakidakos, Stamatis; Veneti, Anastasia (2023). "Communication practices, new media technologies, and anarchist movements: The website of the Greek anarchist group Rouvikonas as a "one stop shop"". In Poulakidakos, Stamatis; Veneti, Anastasia; Rovisco, Maria (eds.). Social Movements and Everyday Acts of Resistance: Solidarity in a Changing World. Routledge. doi:10.4324/9781003265337-9. ISBN 9781003265337.
- Veneti, Anastasia; Poulakidakos, Stamatis (2020). "The Visual Rhetoric of YouTube Videos by the Greek Anarchist Group Rouvikonas". In Crick, Nathan (ed.). The Rhetoric of Social Movements: Networks, Power, and New Media. Routledge. doi:10.4324/9780429436291-6. ISBN 9780429436291.
