= The Blue Condominium of Exarcheia =

Coordinates: 37.9866°N 23.7354°E

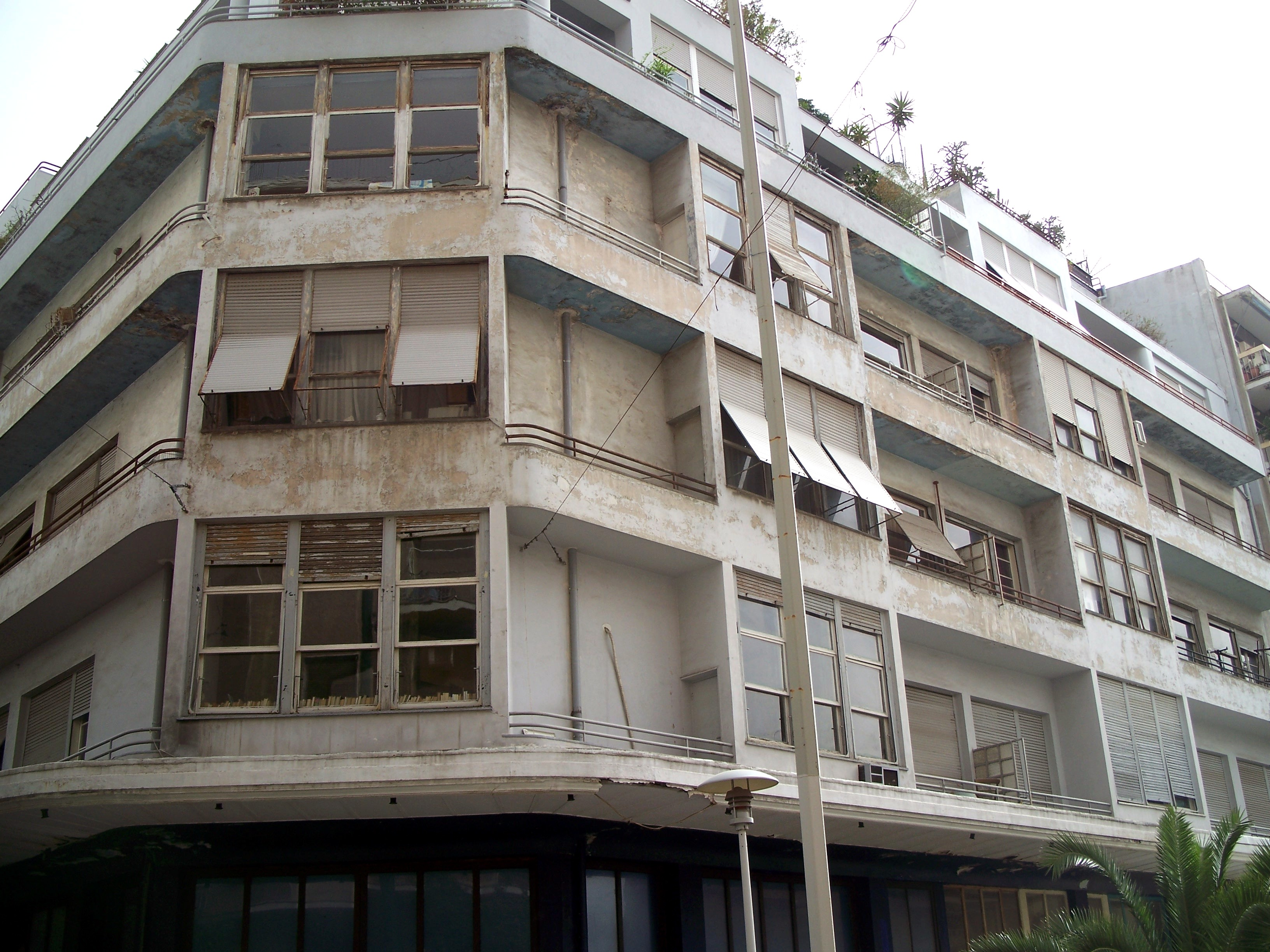
The "Blue Condominium" in 2008, no longer blue.

The Blue Condominium (Greek: Μπλε πολυκατοικία, therefore also called Blue Polykatoikia), is an apartment building in the Exarcheia neighborhood of Athens, Greece. It lies on the corner of Arachovis and Themistokleous Streets, adjacent to Exarcheia square and was built in 1932–1933 for Kyriakos Panagiotakos, the architect who designed the building. Being a very important example of modern architecture in Athens, it was designed by architect Kyriakoulis Panagiotakos. It took its nickname from the initial dark blue colour of its façade, which was selected by painter Spyros Papaloukas.

== Description ==
The building actually consists of two independent six-floor buildings that are joined at the top floor. Particular care was given to the design and construction of the common areas such as the two entry halls, concierge desks, corridors, staircases, laundry, and the meeting room on the top floor. The meeting room was later separated into seven new apartments, thus increasing their number from 32 to 39. The original designs included a pool, but its construction was never completed. On the ground floor used to be the café "Floral".

It was an innovative and distinctive building of that era. When Le Corbusier visited it during the fourth congress of CIAM, he said that "it is very beautiful."

Through time, notable people have lived in the Blue Condominium such as Leonidas Kyrkos (politician), Renos Apostolidis (writer), Sofia Vembo (singer), Lili Zografou (writer and descendant of Dionysios Solomos), Dimitris Horn (actor), Alexis Minotis (actor), Katina Paxinou (actress), the owner Kostis Antanopoulos and his family, Fredy Germanos (journalist and author), Dimitris Myrat (orchestra director), Evaggelos Meimarakis (politician and speaker of the Greek Parliament).

== Events ==
During the Metaxas dictatorship and World War II the building housed the counterintelligence organization "Midas 614" and its staff officer Ioannis Tsigantes. During the Dekemvriana events, fighters of the Greek People's Liberation Army had attempted three times to blow up the building. The Blue Condominium can be seen in Greek films like The Jealous Cat (1956) and Stamatis and Gregoris (1962).
