= Panepistimio metro station (Athens) =

Athens Metro station

Πανεπιστήμιο Panepistimio
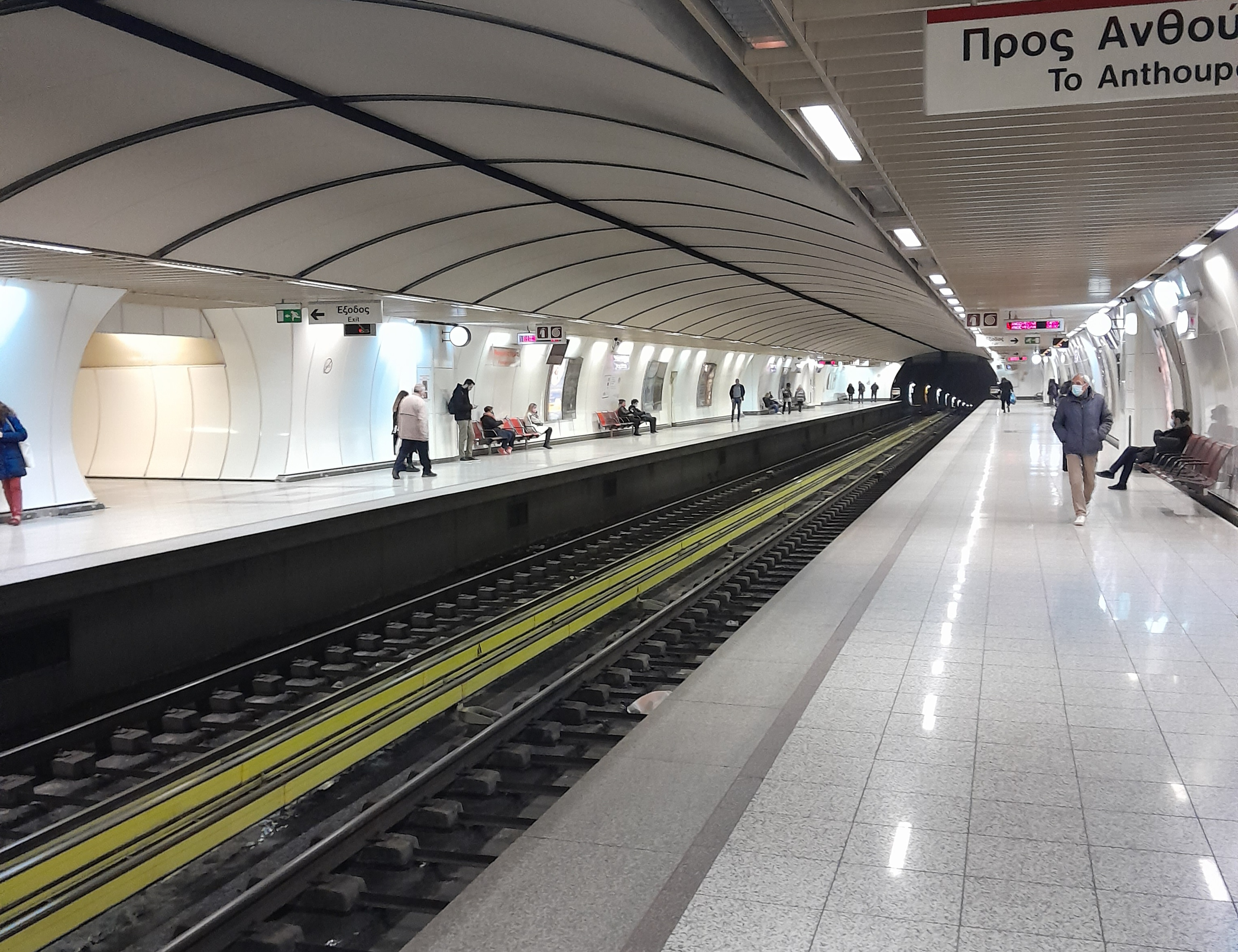
- Station platforms

General information
- Location: Athens; Greece
- Coordinates: 37°58′49″N 23°43′59″E
- Manager: STASY
- Line: Athens Metro Line 2
- Platforms: 2
- Tracks: 2

Construction
- Structure type: Underground
- Accessible: Yes

Key dates
- 28 January 2000: Opened

Services
Preceding station	Athens Metro	Following station
Omonia towards Anthoupoli	Line 2	Syntagma towards Elliniko
Future service
Exarcheia towards Alsos Veikou	Line 4 transfer at Akadimia	Kolonaki towards Goudi
Location

Panepistimio (Greek: Πανεπιστήμιο) is a station on Athens Metro Line 2. It opened on 28 January 2000, and is adjacent to the National Library of Greece, the National and Kapodistrian University of Athens and the Academy of Athens. "Panepistimio" means "university" in Greek.

== History ==
The earliest proposal for a metro station at Panepistimio was by Alexandros Verdelis of the Greek Engineers Association in 1925, where it was known as Theatrou (Greek: Θεάτρου. Subsequent proposals included the station under various names, such as Akadimia (Ακαδημία).

== Future ==
When Line 4 of Athens Metro is completed, the station will have an underpass connection with "Akademia" Station.

== Station layout ==
Sections with an asterisk (*) are under construction.

G
Street level
Exits
B1
Panepistimiou concourse
- Customer Service
- Tickets
B2
Akadimias concourse*
- Customer Service
- Tickets
Side platform, doors will open on the right
Platform 1
← to Anthoupoli (Omonia)
Platform 2
to Elliniko (Syntagma) →
Side platform, doors will open on the right
B3
Transfer to Akadimia station*
B4
Side platform, doors will open on the right
Platform*
← to Alsos Veikou (Exarcheia)
Platform*
to Goudi (Kolonaki) →
Side platform, doors will open on the right
