= Modern architecture in Athens =

Modern architecture in Athens flourished during two periods, between 1930 and 1940, and between 1950 and 1975. Influenced by the European modern movement led by Le Corbusier and other architects, Greek architects tried to adapt these principles into Greek practice. However, conservatism was often a hindering factor and usually both classically inspired as well as modernist buildings were built during the same periods.

== Prelude ==
=== The polykatoikía (condominium) ===
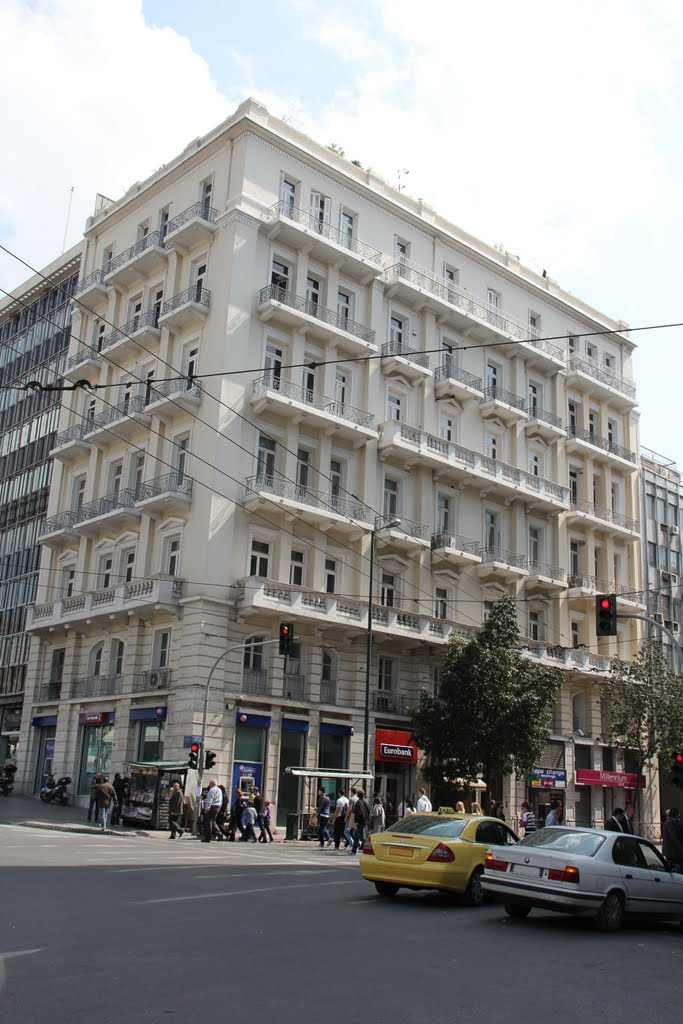
The apartment building built between 1918 and 1919 by Alexandros Metaxas for Petros Giannaros.

The term πολυκατοικία (polykatoikia, literally "multiresidence") is used in Greek to denote every apartment building. One of the first, if not the first, apartment buildings in Athens was built in 1918–1919 by architect Alexandros Metaxas in an eclectic style for Petros Giannaros on Philellinon and Othonos Streets, adjacently to Syntagma Square. Thanks to the fact that this building was one of the first ones to be built with reinforced concrete, it was unexpectedly, as well as asymmetrically higher than the adjacent ones. This led to a furious reaction and two royal decrees, one in 1919 and another in 1922, which set the height for buildings according to the width of the street they lay on, with a maximum height of 26 metres for wide streets.

The changes that took place in Greek society after the defeat of Greece during the Greco-Turkish War of 1919–1922, and the ensuing population exchange between Greece and Turkey created different housing needs for the population, revealed how important the construction sector could be for the Greek economy, and influenced, as a result, the legal framework of the polykatoikia.

In 1929, two important laws concerning apartment buildings took effect. The law about "horizontal property" (οριζόντια ιδιοκτησία) made it possible that many different owners own one apartment building, each by owning one or more apartment units. Theoretically, each apartment corresponds to a percentage of the original plot. The most important effect of this law was the practice of "αντιπαροχή" (antiparochì, literally "a supply in exchange"). With antiparochì, the owner of a plot, who can't afford to build an apartment building by himself, makes a contract with a construction company so that the latter will build the apartment building but keep the ownership of as many apartments as the contract states. Although during the interwar period the practice of antiparochì was limited, as the construction of most apartment buildings was financed solely by the original owners of the plot, antiparochì became the most common method for financing the construction of condominiums (polykatoikìes) from the 1950s onwards.

Later in 1929 came into effect the first General Building Regulation. Most importantly, not only did it regulate the height and surface area of the buildings, but it also introduced innovations that their use came to characterize the modern style of the buildings of the era, such as the bay windows, or erkers (έρκερ), as they are known in Greek after the German term.

=== Conservatism between 1900 and 1930 ===
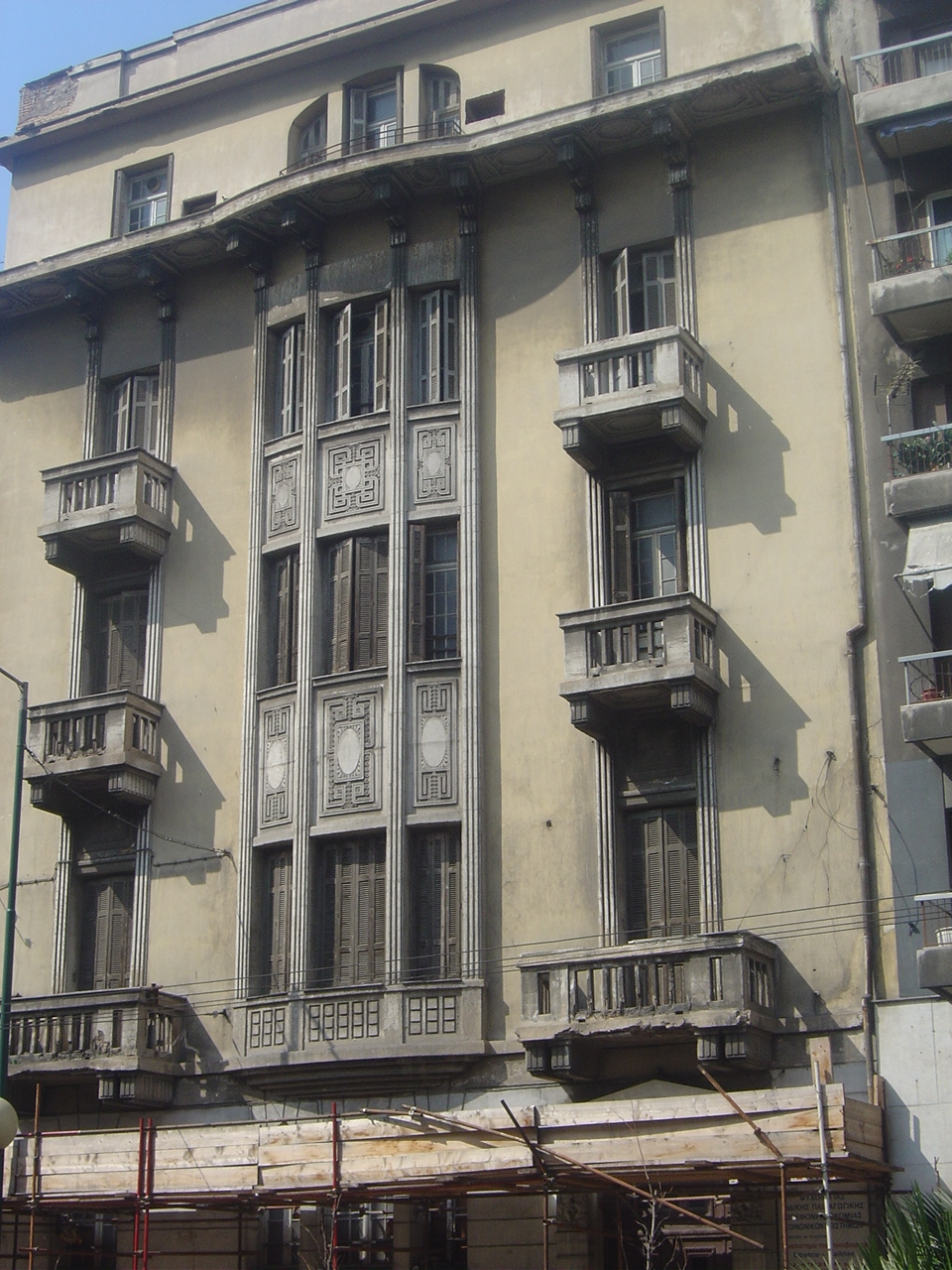
Papaleonardou's apartment building, designed in 1925 by Kostas Kitsikis, incorporates Art Deco elements creating thus an eclectic style. In this building lived Maria Callas between 1937 and 1945.

During the first two decades of the 20th century, Greek architecture failed to follow international trends, especially Art Nouveau and, to a lesser extent, Art Deco, or to produce an architectural style with consistent features that could act as a successor to Greek Neoclassicism. As a result, buildings in Athens that can be characterized as 'Art Nouveau' are scarce. The tumultuous changes and poor economic state of the Greek society must be taken into account when studying this period. Most architects of that period that built in Athens were conservative and late in adopting other non-classical European styles, often altering them and mingling them with classical motifs, creating thus an eclectic style.

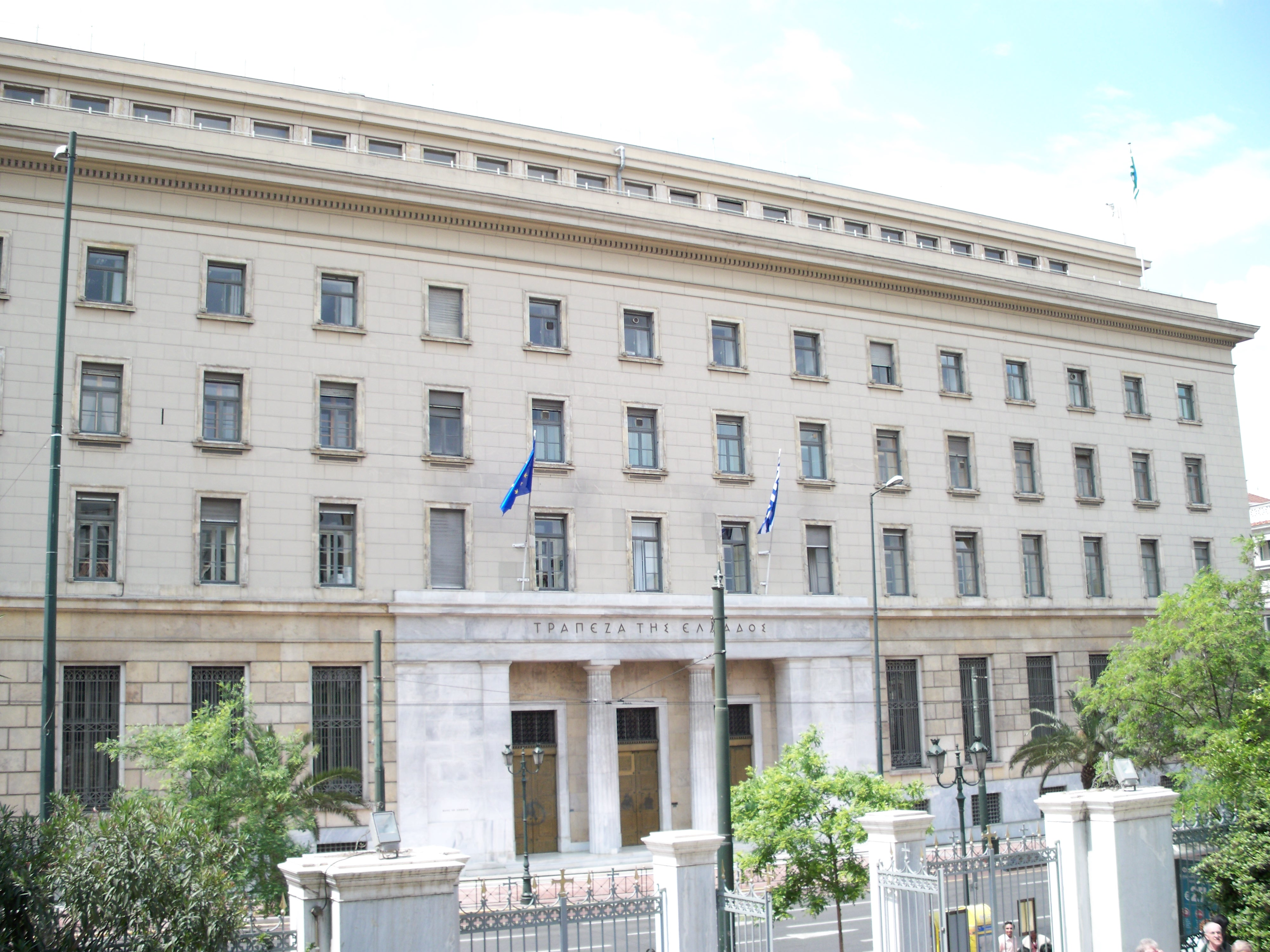
The building of Bank of Greece, designed in 1933 in a conservative simplified classical style.

During the last part of this period and under the influence of Anastasios Metaxas's work (1862–1937), most public buildings were built in a so-called "simplified classical" style (αφαιρετικός κλασικισμός), similar to "stripped classicism". Such buildings include classical ornamentation albeit in a much lesser degree; Art Deco ornamentation also becomes much more common. Such buildings, with their imposing façades, usually emit grandeur and austerity. The most important building of this style is the Bank of Greece on Panepistimiou Street built between 1933 and 1938 by a team of architects led by Nikolaos Zoumpoulidis, Kimon Laskaris, and Konstantinos Papadakis. Although it is relatively lightly decorated, every ornament is classical in style and its façade is even reminiscent of the Greek parliament, designed in 1834. Other buildings are the Athens University of Economics and Business on Patision Street designed in 1926 by Anastasios Metaxas, and the General Accounting Office of Greece on Panepistimiou Street designed in 1928 by Emmanouil Lazaridis which incorporates Art Deco elements.

== The interwar modern movement in Athens ==
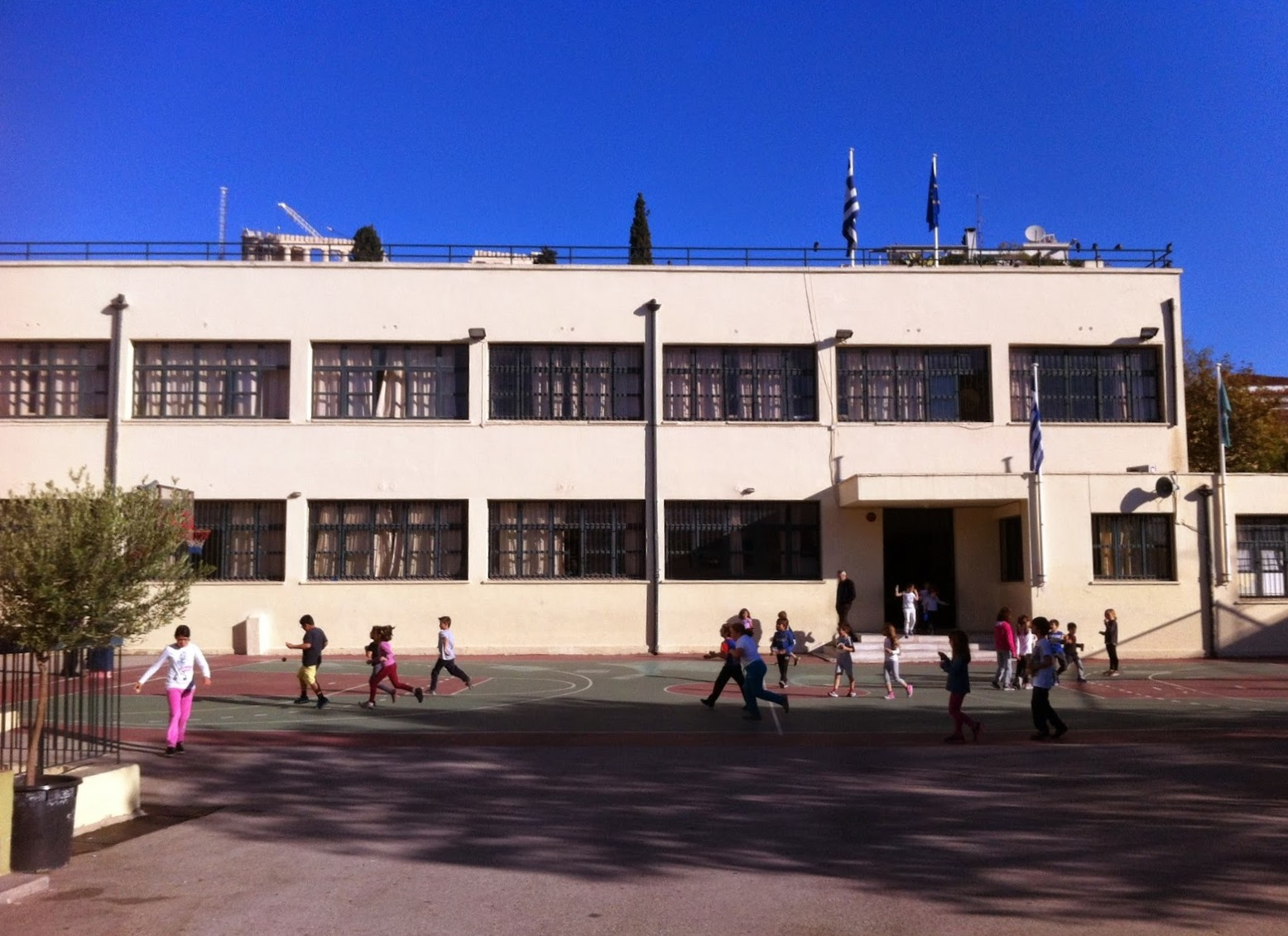
A primary school in Makrygianni near the Acropolis of Athens. It was designed in 1931 by Patroklos Karantinos.

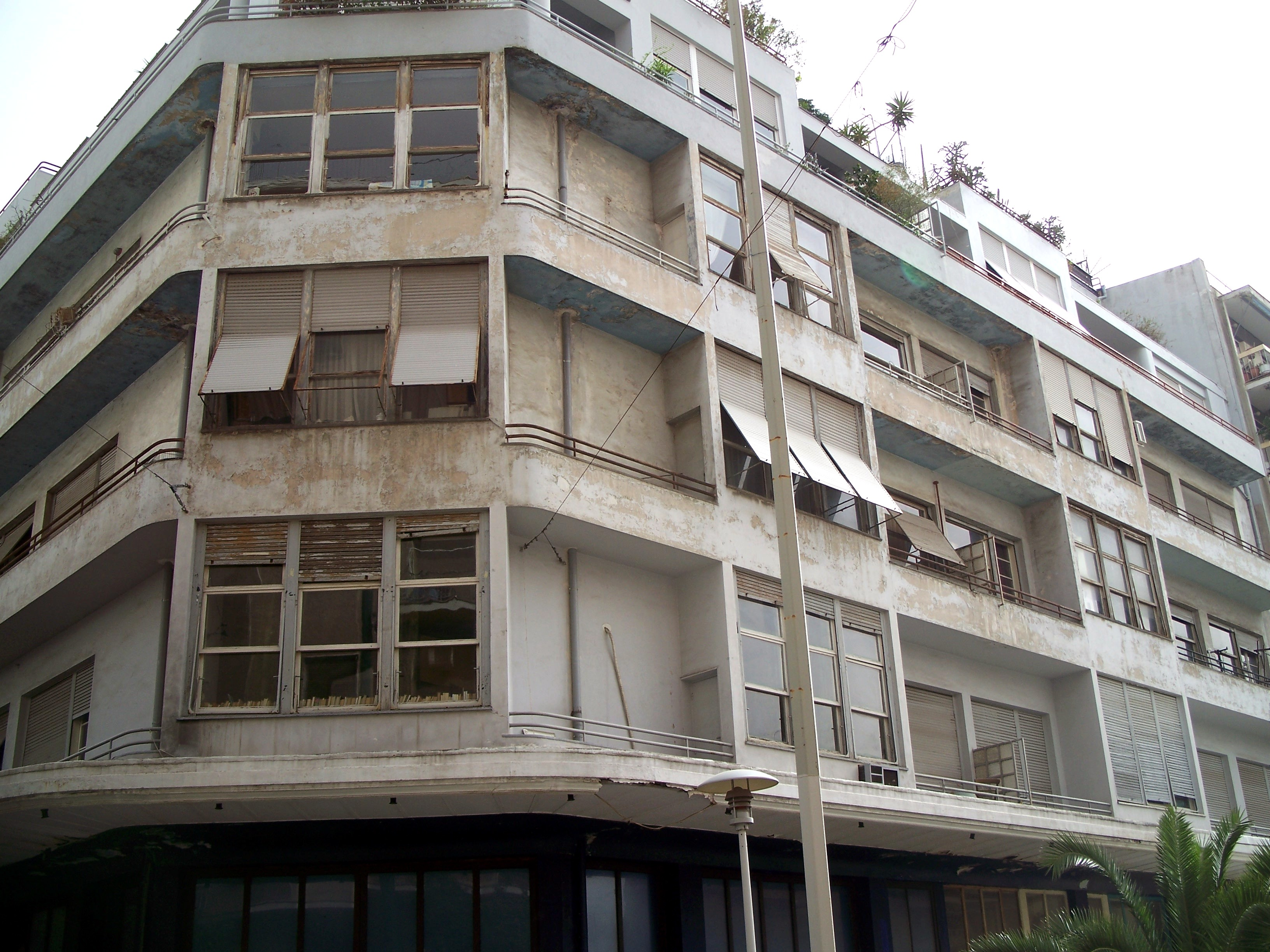
The Blue Polykatoikia on Exarcheia Square, designed in 1932 by Kyriakos Panagiotakos.

Apartment building on Stournari and Zaimi Streets designed in 1933 by Thoukydidis Valentis and Polyvios Michailidis. It features no bay windows but long horizontal windows.

Rex Theatre on Panepistimiou Street. Designed by Leonidas Bonis and Vasileios Kassandras and built between 1935 and 1937, it is one of few buildings inspired by American Art Deco as in New York's skyscrapers.

The refugees' apartment buildings on Alexandras designed in 1933 by Kimon Laskaris and Dimitrios Kyriakos in a Bauhaus style. They are now dilapidated. See a photograph of how they used to be when completed.

Despite the initial conservatism, modern architecture became much more prominent during the end of the 1920s. Recent graduates of the School of Architecture of the National Technical University of Athens (NTUA) which was founded in 1917, as well as graduates from other European architectural schools managed to make Modernism much more popular. A very ambitious plan was the construction of many public schools, not only in Athens but in all of Greece, by the Ministry of Education of the 1928–1932 Venizelos government. The program was led by architect Nikos Mitsakis (1899–1941), a graduate of the NTUA, who, in 1930, was appointed director of the office for the construction of the new schools. The designs of the new schools are based on Le Corbusier's principles, are completely unadorned with large horizontal windows, and are built with abundant and cheap materials such as stonemasonry and reinforced concrete. Some of the most important examples of modern school architecture are Dimitris Pikionis's school under Mount Lycabettus designed in 1931, Kyriakos Panagiotakos's school in Pangrati designed in 1933, and many others. During the fourth congress of CIAM that took place in Athens in 1933, the public schools were much discussed. During his visit in Athens for the congress, Le Corbusier visited a school designed by Panagiotakos on Liosion Street and wrote "Compliments de Le Corbusier" on its wall.

The cityscape of Athens in the 1930s was formed, though, by the great number of modern private apartment buildings that were built during that decade. Many neighbourhoods of Athens saw a construction spree fuelled by a more powerful middle and upper-middle class that were friendly to modernism and wanted to invest in property, as well as by the increase of population. Such neighbourhoods include Kolonaki, Exarcheia, Kypseli, the area around Amerikis Square, and other central areas.

Influenced by Le Corbusier, Walter Gropius, and Erich Mendelsohn, as well as more conservative architects such as Michel Roux-Spitz, virtually every apartment building that was built in Athens during that decade followed this style. These buildings are characterized by the bay windows which can protrude up to 1.4 metres under the 1929 General Building Regulation, the non-existent or subtle ornamentation such as occasional Art Deco motifs, especially on ironwork, and spacious entry halls. They often have permanent decorative pergolas on the terraces of the top floors. The use of bay windows produces a plasticity effect to the façades. An example of an apartment building with completely unadorned façades and many bay windows is the famous Ble Polykatoikia near Exarcheia Square designed in 1932 by Kyriakos Panagiotakos. Other architects used bolder Corbusian features on their buildings with flat façades without bay windows and with long horizontal windows. One such example is the apartment building on Stournari and Zaimi Streets designed by Thoukydidis Valentis and Polyvios Michailidis in 1933.

Although most private buildings were built in a modern style, most public prestige buildings during the 1930s were still built according to a simplified classical style, as mentioned above. Only some special-purpose public buildings were built according to modernist principles. They include; the apartment buildings on Alexandras Avenue designed in 1933 by Kimon Laskaris and Dimitrios Kyriakos and built by the government to accommodate refugees of the 1923 population exchange; the Sotiria Hospital designed in 1931 by Ioannis Despotopoulos; the wing for the laundry and kitchen at the Sotiria Hospital designed in c. 1937 by Periklis Georgakopoulos; and some industrial buildings.

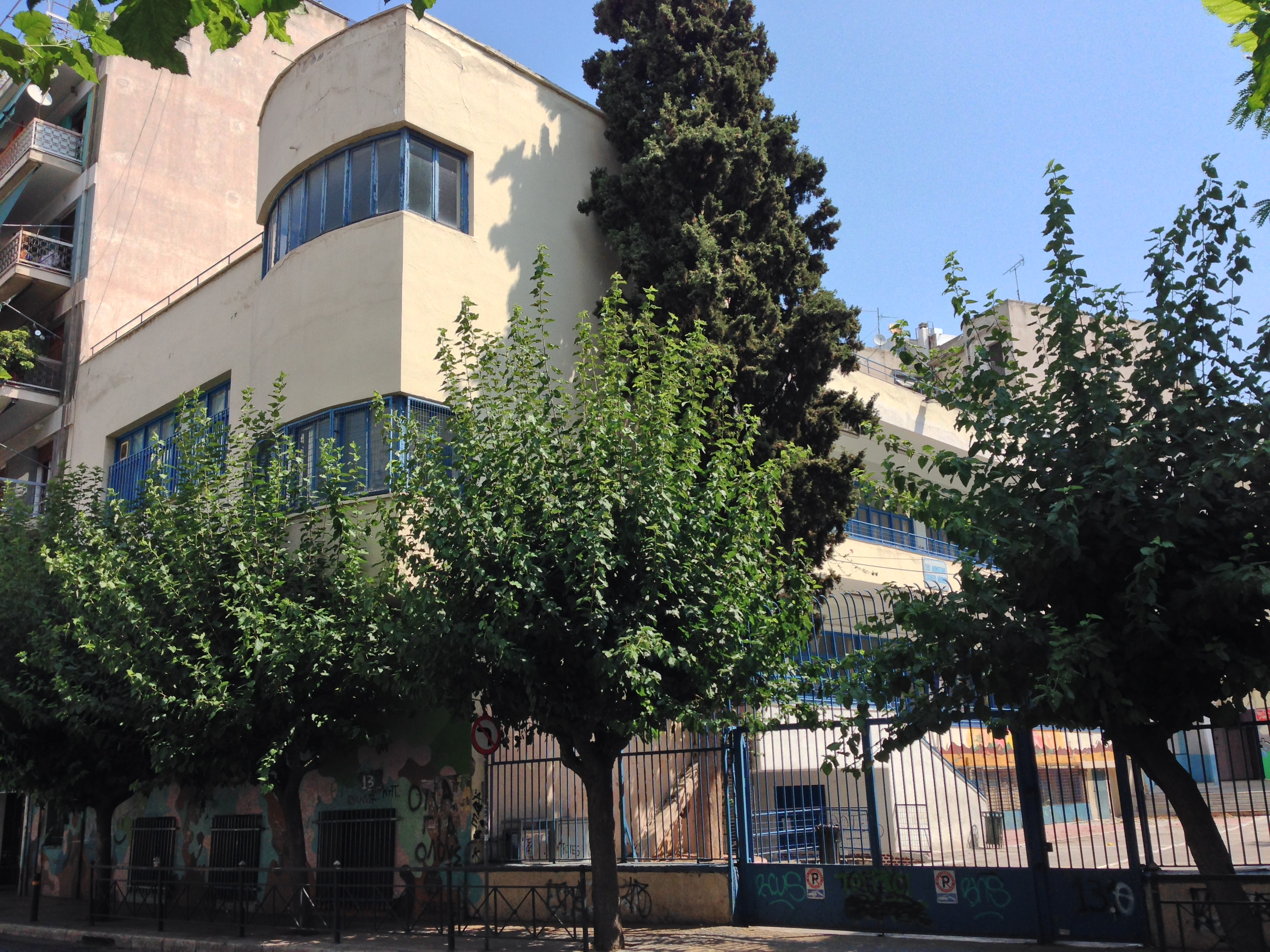
A school designed in 1931 by Kyriakos Panagiotakos. When Le Corbusier visited it in 1933 he wrote "Compliments de Le Corbusier" on its wall.

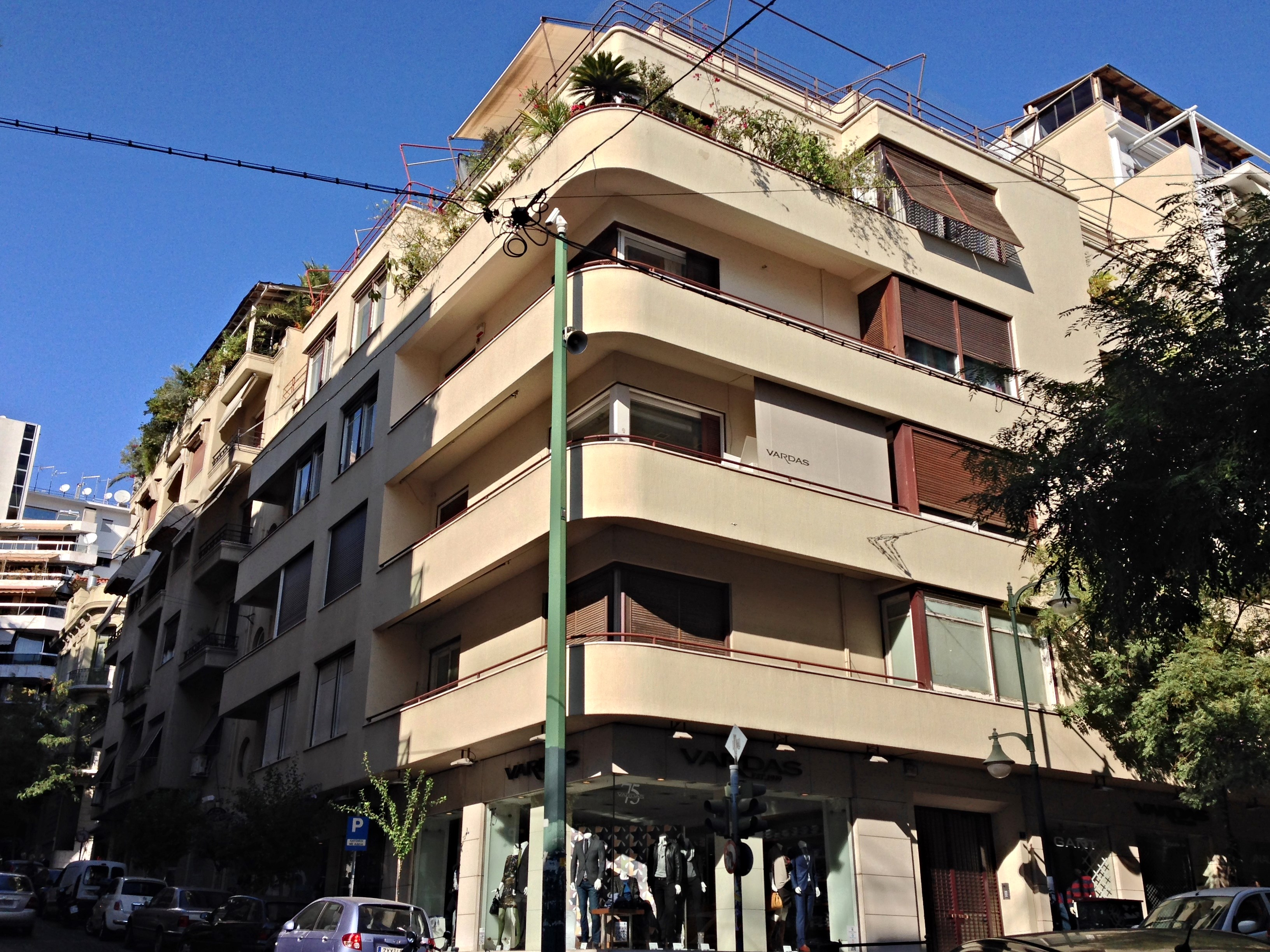
An apartment building in Kolonaki designed by architects Georges Goldberg and Prokopis Vasileiadis and built between 1935–1937.

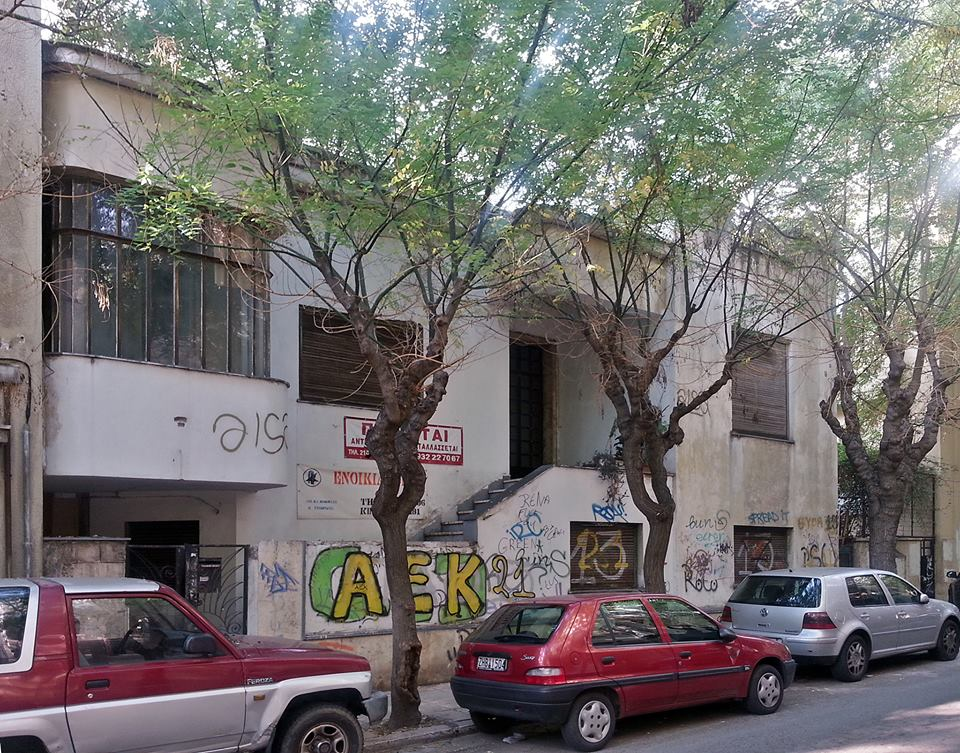
Apart from apartment buildings, modern houses in central Athens are rare. This one in Kypseli was built in 1939.

A part of the Sotiria Hospital of Thoracic Diseases. It was designed in 1931 by Ioannis Despotopoulos with later additions in 1937 by Periklis Georgakopoulos.

== The Metaxas regime and initial post-World War II conservatism ==
=== Stagnation during the Metaxas regime ===
Although Ioannis Metaxas's dictatorship (1936–1941) didn't forcibly impose an official architectural style, nor banned modern architecture, it awoke Greek society's conservative ideas and influenced, as a result, architecture. Public buildings were still built according to simplified classicism. For example, the Municipal Market of Kypseli, which was inaugurated in 1937 by the dictator and was designed by architect Alexandros Metaxas (the two are unrelated), includes a classical cornice and small ionic capitals, despite the fact that it is a special-purpose building.

Something that also changed significantly the appearance of Athenian buildings was the reduction of the maximum possible protrusion of the bay windows from 1.4 metres to 40 centimetres in 1937. Architect and professor at the NTUA Kostas Kitsikis had lobbied extensively for this change because he thought that builders and owners abused long bay windows in order to build as much surface area as they could, turning Athens into "a bad copy of German and Dutch cities."

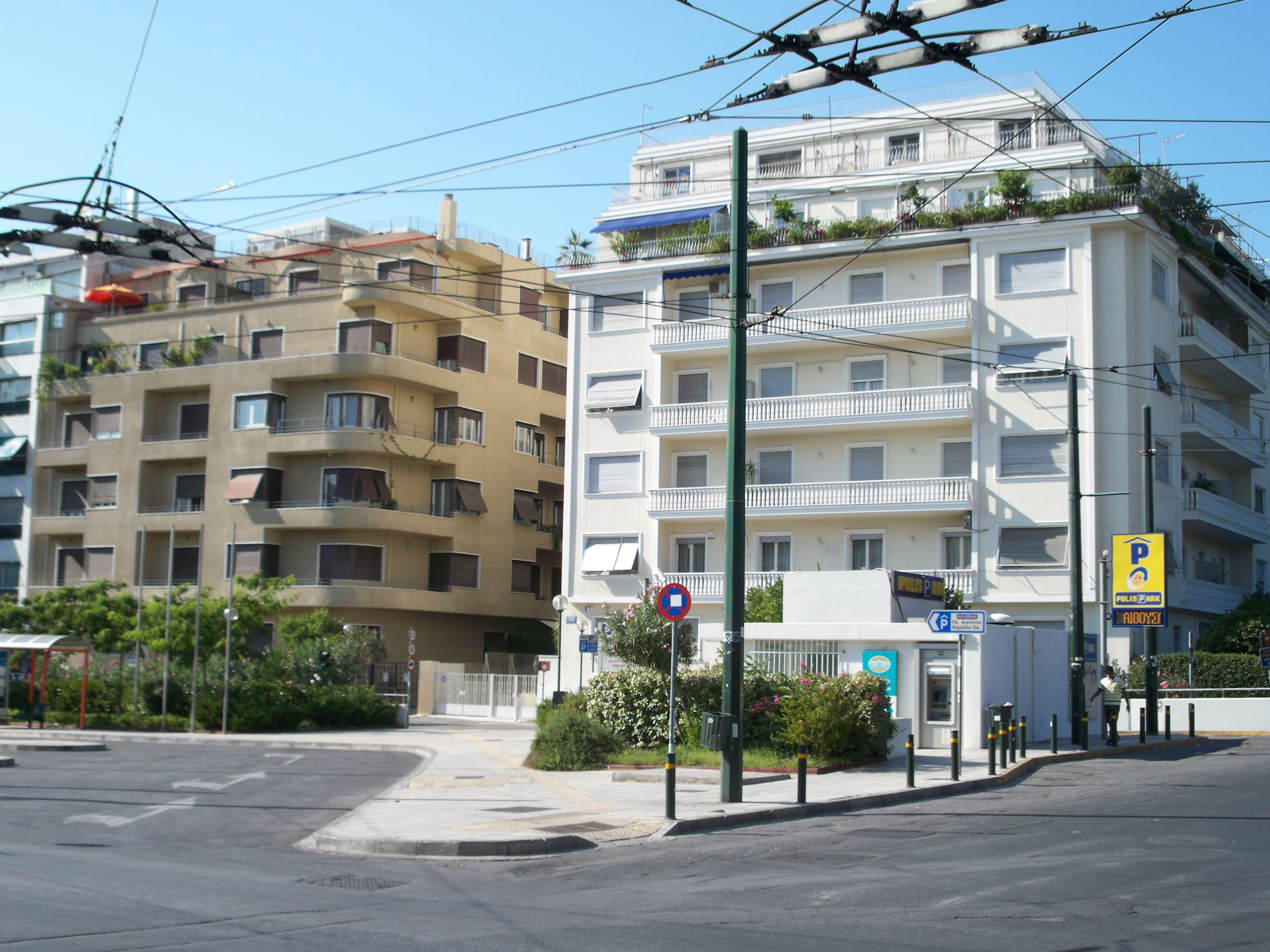
Two apartment buildings on Aigyptou Square, near Pedion Areos. Savvidis's apartment building (left) was designed in c. 1935 by Nikolaos Nikolaidis in a modern style. The right apartment building was built in the 1950s in a "simplified classical" style.

=== Post-war simplified classicism ===
The building of the Bodossaki Foundation on Amalias Avenue. It was designed by Andreas Ploumistos and completed in 1958. Despite its conservatism it has nuances of modernism such as its façade grid.

The simplified classicism of the 1930s remained dominant and only slightly changed well into the 1950s. Again, public and other important buildings but this time also apartment buildings were decorated with classically orientated ornaments. Main entrance doors, railings, and lighting sconces were made of richly decorated ironwork. Often, balustrades were used instead of railings. White marble was used extensively, especially in entry halls which were often very spacious and white was the preferred colour of the façades.

However, in contrast with pre-war simplified classicism, the façades of the newer buildings often included a grid which was formed by balconies and thin vertical columns. Many apartment buildings that were built during that era in Kolonaki and other central upscale neighbourhoods of Athens were designed by architects preferred by the upper-middle class such as Emmanouil Vourekas and Konstantinos Kapsampelis.

== The modernism of the 1960s ==
The Air Force Assistance Fund building designed in 1947 by Thoukydidis Valentis.

=== The "rediscovery" of Modernism ===
The building of the National Museum of Contemporary Art on Syngrou Avenue. It was designed in 1957 by Takis Zenetos as the Fix brewery and was originally twice as long as it is now.

Already since 1949, the completion of the Greek Air Force Assistance Fund building on Akadimias Street, which was designed in 1947 by Thoukydidis Valentis, showed the course that most office buildings in central Athens would follow. The building is completely undecorated with a subtly visible concrete frame in the form of a grid, and has many Corbusian principles such as the ground floor pilotis. Valentis had a consistent ideology behind the design principles of office buildings concerning practicality and aesthetics which he later in 1960 wrote down in Architektoniki [Architecture] review. Some years later, two young architects, Nikos Valsamakis (born in 1924) and Takis Zenetos (1926–1977) also exerted much influence in revitalizing Greek modernism. Their buildings, notably one of Valsamakis's first apartment buildings on Semitelou Street (1951) and Zenetos's Fix brewery on Syngrou Avenue (1957, now partly demolished and renovated houses the National Museum of Contemporary Art), are radically different from their contemporary counterparts. Valsamakis's apartment building on Semitelou Street is devoid of any ornament and has a façade grid formed by balconies and columns. Moreover, its design is inspired by traditional architecture only in matters of materials, such as the stonemasonry of the ground floor and wooden elements elsewhere, and colouring, such as the contrast between white and bright red. Zenetos's designs, on the other hand, are inspired by technological and industrial progress.

=== Mature developments ===
The office building at the start of Ermou Street on Syntagma Square. It was designed in 1961 by Dimitris Papazisis and its interior by Takis Zenetos. It has a curtain wall made of I-beams, marble, and glass.

Gradually, apart from Le Corbusier's principles such as pilotis and horizontal windows, also post-war International Style came to influence most buildings in Athens. Also, the grid on façades, especially those of office buildings, became one of the most important fields in design innovation. Departing from Valentis's Corbusian proto-Brutalist accentuated grid made of permanent masonry, glass and aluminium curtain walls started to take over. Valsamakis's office building on Kapnikareas Square (1958) and Dimitris Papazisis's office building on Syntagma Square (1961) were the first buildings in Athens where a full blown curtain wall similar in fashion to those of Ludwig Mies van der Rohe was implemented.

OTE building near Victoria Square designed in 1961 by Kostas Kitsikis.

Marble, an abundant material in Greece, was again much used. In 1961, Kostas Kitsikis designed an office building for OTE on Tritis Septemvriou Street which includes a 58-metre tower with curtain walls and a lower wing with long brise soleil.

Important buildings of that era include; the building of the Athens Conservatoire on Rigillis Street. It was originally conceived by Ioannis Despotopoulos as part of a large cultural centre in 1959 which went through many alterations and finally stalled. Finally, only the Athens Conservatoire was built between 1969 and 1976. The building is praised for its clean lines, the feeling of transition when one moves from the street into the building, and Despotopoulos's handling of both tradition and monumentality; the building of the National Hellenic Research Foundation, which was designed by Constantinos Doxiadis and built between 1965 and 1968. Similar to Oscar Niemeyer's buildings, its front and rear façades have strict grids while its lateral ones are covered by smooth marble. Moreover, the library wing with its low height makes a contrast with the taller office wing in the background; the Hilton Athens which was designed by Emmanouil Vourekas, Prokopis Vasileiadis, and Spyros Staikos and completed in 1963. It is a modern building; however, the extensive use of white marble and thin columns made it an example of the "classicizing modernism" of that period, similar in fashion to the United States embassy building in Athens designed by Walter Gropius and completed in 1961.

The Athens Conservatoire designed by Ioannis Despotopoulos.

The National Hellenic Research Foundation designed by Constantinos Doxiadis.

The Hilton Athens.

The embassy of United States in Athens, designed by Walter Gropius.

An office building on Stadiou Street designed in c. 1960 by Emmanouil Vourekas and Periklis Sakellarios.

== See also ==
- Modern Greek architecture
