= Exarcheia =

Exarcheia Εξάρχεια
- Neighbourhood
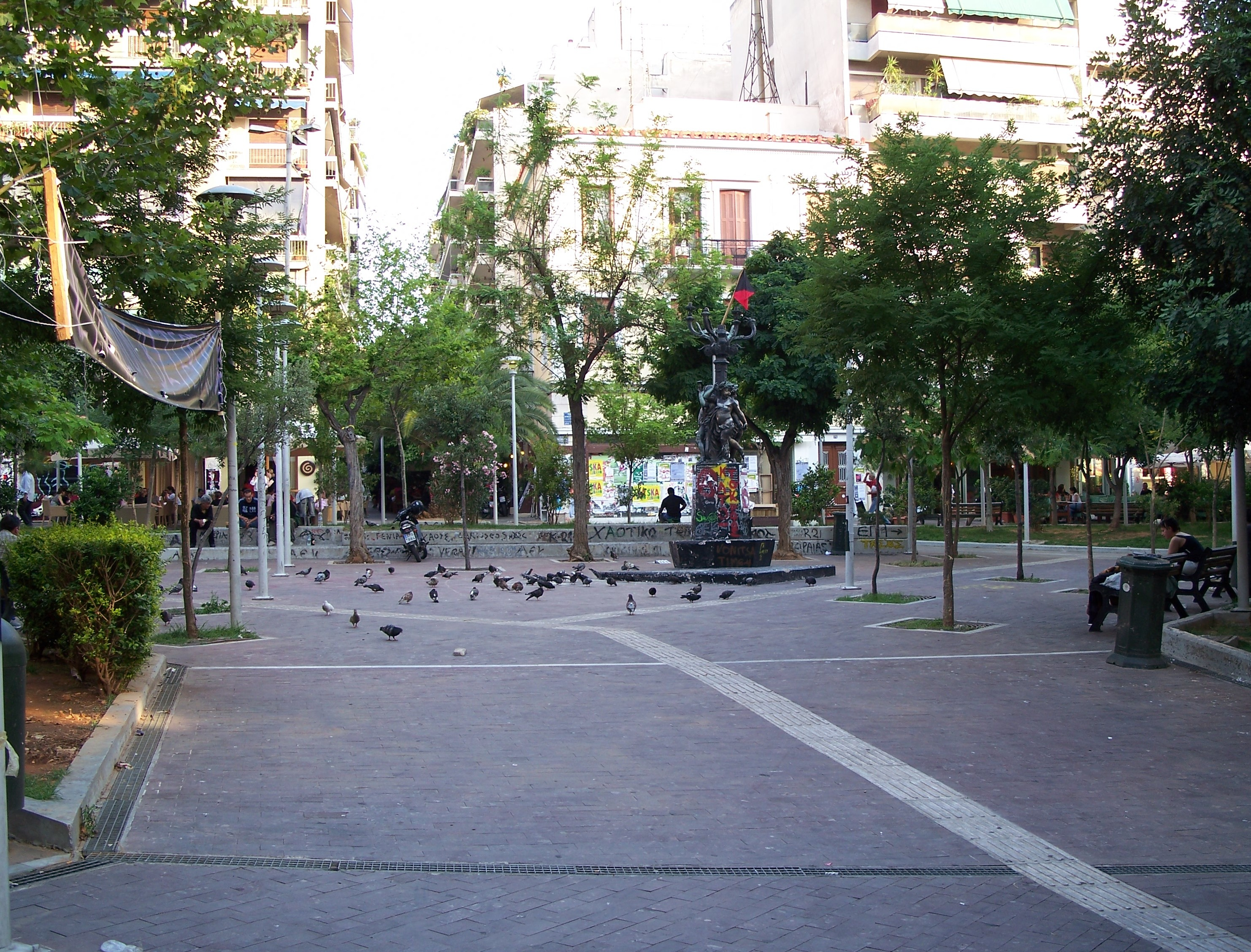
- The central square in 2007
- Interactive map of Exarcheia
- Coordinates: 37°59′10″N 23°44′5″E
- Country: Greece
- Region: Attica
- City: Athens
- Postal code: 106 80, 106 81, 106 82, 106 83
- Area code: 210
- Website: www.cityofathens.gr

Exarcheia (Greek: Εξάρχεια, pronounced [eˈksarçi.a]) is a neighbourhood in central Athens, Greece close to the historical building of the National Technical University of Athens. Exarcheia took its name from a 19th-century businessman named Exarchos (Greek: Έξαρχος) who opened a large general store there. Exarcheia is bordered on the east by Kolonaki and is framed by Patission Street, Panepistimiou Street and Alexandras Avenue.

== Features ==
The National Archaeological Museum of Athens, the National Technical University of Athens and Strefi Hill are all located in Exarcheia. The central square features many cafés and bars with numerous retail computer shops located mainly on Stournari street, also called the Greek Silicon Valley. Located on Exarcheia square is one of the oldest summer cinemas of Athens, called "Vox", as well as the Antonopoulos apartment building, known as the "Blue Building", because of its original colour, which is a typical example of modern architecture in Athens during the inter-war period. Due to the political and intellectual character of Exarcheia, many bookstores, fair trade shops and organic food stores are also located in Exarcheia. Exarcheia is also known for its comic book shops, and its night clubs, cafés, and bars.

== History ==
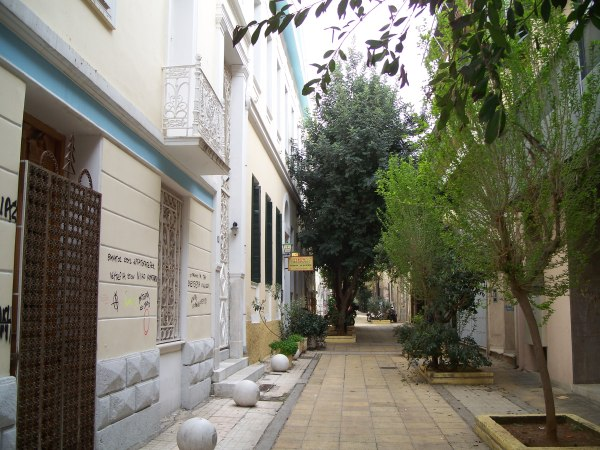
View of a street

Exarcheia was created between 1870 and 1880 at the confines of the city and has played a significant role in the social and political life of Greece. It is there that the Athens Polytechnic uprising of November 1973 took place. In December 2008, the murder of 15-year-old Alexandros Grigoropoulos by a policeman in Exarcheia caused rioting throughout Greece.

Exarcheia is a place where many intellectuals and artists live and an area where many politically motivated groups are accommodated. Exarcheia is also an art hub where theatrical shows and concerts are held around the central square. The headquarters of PASOK, a Greek political party that supported austerity measures dictated by the European Union in 2009, are also located in Exarcheia and has been a target of attacks by anarchists. Police stations and other symbols of authority (and capitalism) such as banks are often targets of far-leftist groups. Exarcheia contains many examples of anti-capitalist graffiti. A self-organized health structure providing medical services functions there as well.

Protests that begin in Exarcheia evidence diverse political formations and coalitions, including dispossessed young people, migrants, anti-authoritarians, anarchists, and Greek citizens from the moderate to extreme on both ends of the political spectrum.

The European refugee crisis resulted in an enormous migration to Greece – in 2017, 55,000 people throughout Greece were registered as permanent residents. When borders between Greece and the European Union were closed, many migrants were forced to stay in camps that lacked housing or hygiene infrastructure. As a result, refugees and migrants sought alternative options within Athens, including squats in Exarcheia.

=== Athens Polytechnic uprising ===
On 17 November 1973, the Greek military raided the student occupation of the Athens Polytechnic University, killing 40 civilians. The events resulted in public outrage and the passing of the Academic Asylum Law, which designates university campuses as off-limits to police and military personnel. This law has contributed to the prevalence of protests within Exarcheia, as the Polytechnic functions as a site of insurgent coordination as well as a safe haven from police violence.

=== 2008 Greek riots ===
On 6 December 2008, a Greek police special guard shot and killed 15-year-old Alexis Grigoropoulos within blocks of the Athens Polytechnic University, leading to the largest protests in Greece since the end of the dictatorship in 1974. Protests originated in Exarcheia and it continued to be the epicentre of demonstrations as they spread across Athens.

In the aftermath of the riots, collectives and movements in Exarcheia expanded initiatives experimenting with new political formations, especially to provide public spaces organized around an anti-hierarchical and anti-commercial ethos. For example, activists turned a parking lot into the guerrilla Park Navarinou, which hosted events such as ticket-free movie screenings and anti-consumerist fairs. The Sporos collective developed solidarity economies through trade and sale of Zapatista-produced goods, and the Skoros collective promoted re-use, recycling, and sharing practices. Other new and renewed political formations in Exarcheia included producer or consumer cooperatives and collective kitchens.

=== Migrant communities ===
Exarcheia is the site of a large migrant and refugee community. The overcrowding and abuse within Greek refugee camps has propelled a movement of squatting within Athens and across Greece. There are more than a dozen squats in Athens, primarily centred in Exarcheia, serving as housing, healthcare, and social centres for refugees, migrants, or anarchists. These squats provide space for highly diverse communities and coalitions. For example, the City Plaza squat houses Afghanis, Iraqis, Iranians, Syrians, Kurds, Palestinians, and Pakistanis within a single occupied hotel. Many of these spaces aim to recreate the feeling of home for displaced migrants and refugees.

However, far-right, neo-fascist, and nationalistic organizations have been connected to multiple attacks and burnings of refugee squats. In addition, the government of Alexis Tsipras evicted multiple squats in Athens during Syriza's time in power. In addition, Exarcheia and bordering Omonoia have been the focus of specialized policing tactics in Greece. These include MAT, (Public Order Restoration Units) a riot police unit implemented after the dictatorship; Operation Virtue, which used blockaded areas and rapid raids of public spaces to capture undocumented migrants in the 1970s and 1980s; and Operation Xenios Zeus, which implemented stop-and-search and document checks for foreigners in 2012.

In 2019, a change in political governance affected Exarcheia. The New Democracy party was elected to power nationally in July and the new prime minister Kyriakos Mitsotakis pledged to impose order and to 'clean up' Exarcheia. Subsequently, a new mayor of Athens was elected in August. Immediately, evictions of migrant squats began. The City Plaza squat at 78 Acharnon decided to close itself down on its own terms rather than be evicted. By the end of September 2019, there had been seven evictions, including the 5th School squat.

=== Ultimatum ===
The Ministry of Citizen's Protection broadened the crackdown on squats in Greece by releasing a statement on 20 November 2019 which demanded all squats were to be evacuated in 15 days' time. Commentators quickly noticed that the end of the deadline was 5 December, the day upon which Alexandros Grigoropoulos had been killed in 2008. More evictions followed and by mid December the state was attempting to evict anarchist social centres as well as migrant squats. The New Democracy party installed a Christmas tree on the central square in December. It was quickly burnt down and when a second tree was put up in its place, it was destroyed several hours later.

== Ongoing developments ==
Line 4 of the Athens Metro is expected to have a station at Exarcheia Square, and there has been significant opposition against the construction of the station, mostly by anarchist and anti-state groups.

== Notable people ==
- Renos Apostolidis, writer and critic
- Arleta, singer and musician
- Betty Arvaniti, actress
- Nikolas Asimos, songwriter, singer
- Katerina Gogou, anarchist poet and actress
- Nikolaos Gyzis, artist
- Giorgos Ioannou, writer
- Eleni Kastani, actress
- Napoleon Lapathiotis, poet
- Mary Tsoni, singer and actress

== See also ==
- Freetown Christiania - A neighbourhood in Denmark's capital of Copenhagen with similar Anarchist and countercultural leanings
