= Line 4 (Athens Metro) =

Future rapid transit line in Athens, Greece

Προς Άλσος Βεΐκου/Γουδή To Alsos Veikou/Goudi
- White number four on an orange square
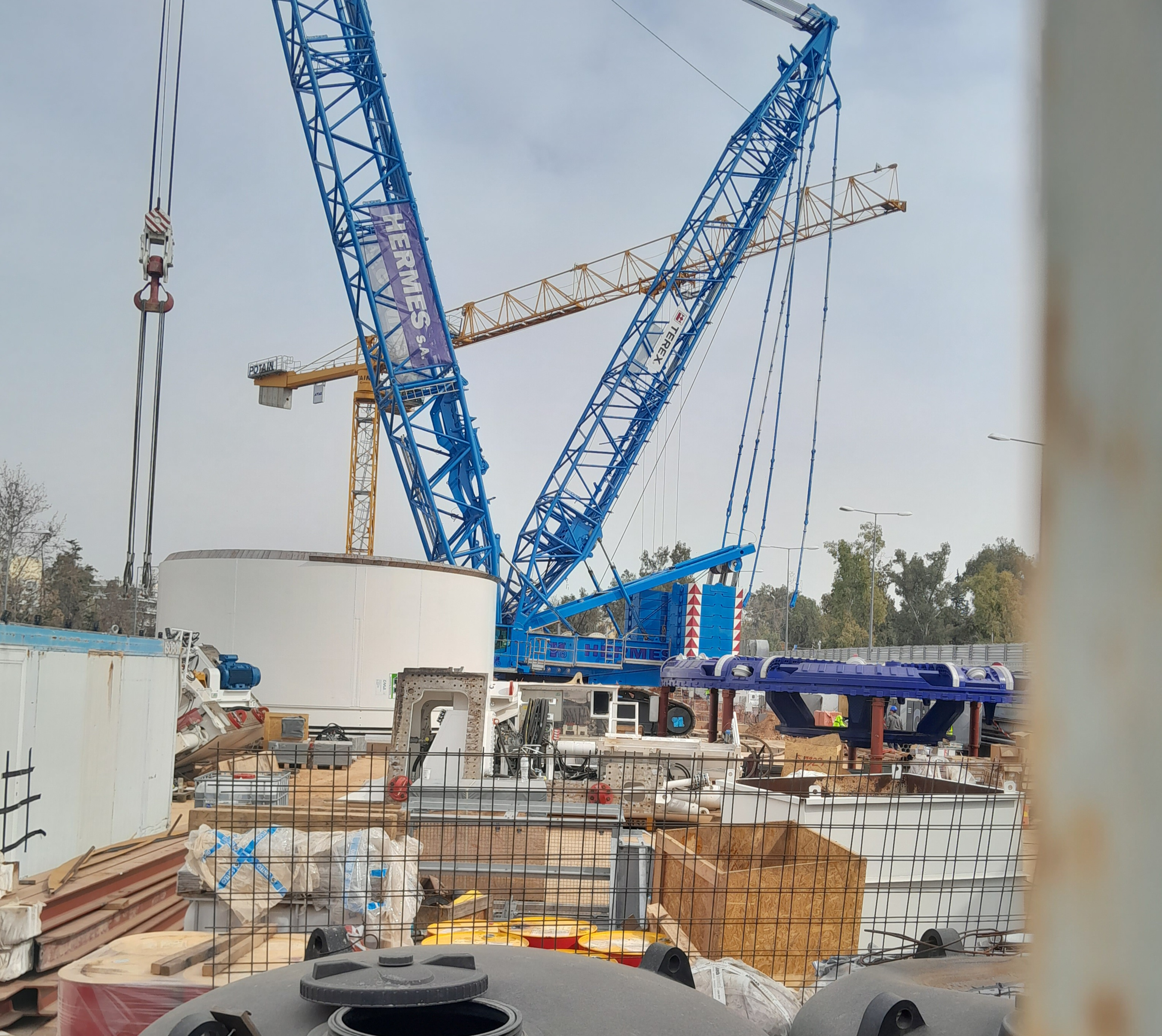
- Construction site at the TBM's entrance shaft in Katechaki, March 2023

Overview
- Status: Under construction
- Locale: Athens
- Termini: Alsos Veikou; Goudi
- Stations: 15
- Colour on map: Orange
- Website: Official website

Service
- Type: Rapid transit
- System: Athens Metro
- Operator: STASY
- Depots: Sepolia; Katehaki
- Rolling stock: Alstom Metropolis
- Daily ridership: 340,000 (EIB estimate)

History
- Work began: 22 June 2021
- Planned opening: 2032

Technical
- Line length: 12.8 km (8.0 mi)
- Character: Deep-level
- Track gauge: 1,435 mm (4 ft 8 1/2 in) standard gauge
- Electrification: 750 V DC third rail

Line 4 of the Athens Metro is a future line that will run from Alsos Veikou to Goudi. Construction of the line started in mid to late-2021 and was scheduled to be completed in 2029 but is more realistically estimated to remain under construction until at least 2032.

Line 4 had been under consideration for many years. Its exact route was changed multiple times. One of the most famous routes was the U-shaped line from Perissos to Katechaki (which are current stations of lines 1 and 3 respectively), including a branch to Vyronas. However, the route from Alsos Veikou to Goudi was chosen, as it has the benefit of being the one passing from the densely populated areas of central Athens, such as Galatsi, Exarcheia, Kolonaki, Kaisariani and Zografou.

In the distant future, it will be extended further north to Lykovrysi, and to other important suburbs of Athens, like Marousi, with a possible future Lykovrysi-Acharnes extension to join the future Line 2 extension.

== Development history ==
Plans for Line 4 of the Athens originated from the Metro Development Study for the period between 1996 and 2000, which proposed branch lines for Lines 2 and 3. The Line 2 branch would have run between Panepistimio and Alsos Veikou, with intermediate stations at Exarcheia, Alexandras, Dikastiria, Kypseli, and Galatsi. The Line 3 branch would have run between Panormou and Marousi, with intermediate stations at Faros, Filothei, Sidera, OAKA (Athens Olympic Sports Complex), and Paradissos (for Suburban Railway trains at Kifisias).

On 1 December 2005, after the original plan for 2 branches was scrapped, Georgios Souflias, then the Minister of the Environment, Urban Planning and Public Works, announced that the two branches would combine to form the U-shaped Line 4. Souflias stated that the original branches, if built, would have caused "significant structural and operational weaknesses" for Lines 2 and 3. The original proposal for Line 4 is similar to what is currently proposed between Alsos Veikou and Marousi (without the Line 5 branch), but it did not include stations at Elikonos, Panepistimioupoli, and OTE.

Originally, Section D of the Line 4 was going to have an interchange station with Line 1 at Perissos, but in late 2020 it was found that there were important reasons, technical, construction and transport service, for choosing a different interchange station. So, Section D was changed to have the interchange station be Pefkakia.

In September 2014, it was announced that a second station would be added to Kaisariani, named "Near East", after the local team of the same name of the Kaisariani Public Gymnasium (Near East Foundation - NEF), as it had been chosen to be built next to the team's stadium, but in late December 2017 to early January 2018, Attiko Metro decided to move Near East station to the Zografou Campus and then renamed it "Panepistimioupoli". At the same time, also in late December 2017, Attiko Metro announced the addition of a new station at the intersection of Parnithos and Agias Glykerias streets in Galatsi. The station's initial name was "Parnithos", but it was later changed to "Elikonos". Elikonos station takes its name from the Elikonas hill located next to the station. Also, Elikonos station will be the deepest on line 4, at a depth of 36.4 meters, with Ilisia station being the second deepest, at 34.7 meters.

Regarding Exarchia station, an alternative location at the intersection of Tositsa and Bouboulinas streets was considered, but did not proceed. Construction of the station began as usual at Exarchia Square in August 2022.

All more than 12 km (8.0 mi) of the metro line are said to have been opened by TBMs "Athina" and "Niki" until the end of 2026 as stated by officials.

== Controversies ==
=== Exarcheia Station ===
There has been significant opposition to a metro station at Exarcheia Square, in a neighborhood known for its radical political and intellectual activism. Some local residents have even gone to protest against the building of a metro station at Exarcheia Square, as they claim that the square has historic value to the community. Locals claim that the "station is part of gentrification scheme aimed at altering historically leftwing and anarchist area". 16 people were detained as a result of these protests. Regardless of the protests, construction of the metro station has resumed since the protests ended.

=== Tunnel Controversy ===
Syriza and KKE MPs brought up a danger with the construction of the tunnel of Line 4 referencing a letter from ΑVAX S.A to Elliniko Metro which stated that the construction of the tunnel is not following certain studies which may cause serious political, economical and safety-related problems.

== Construction stages ==
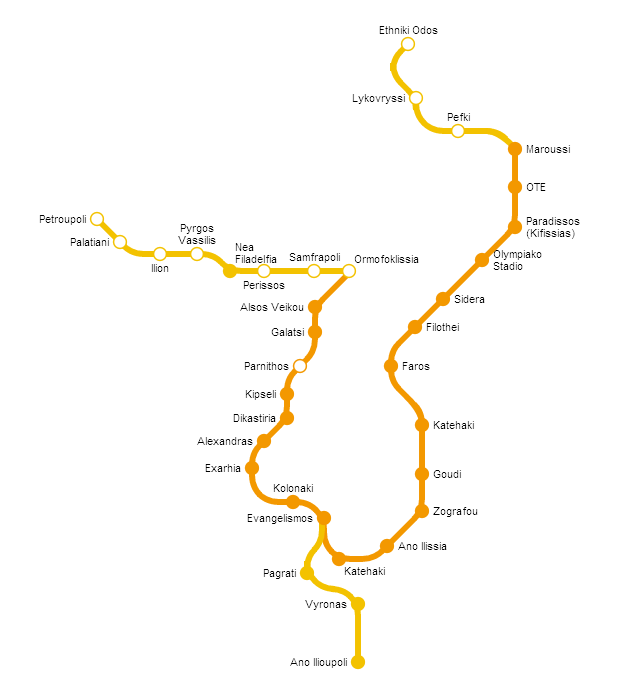

In March 2017, Elliniko Metro (the infrastructure manager of the Athens Metro) split the Line 4 project into five sections, of which Section A is now under construction: proposals for Sections C, D and E first appeared in the Souflias plan in April 2009.

If Elliniko Metro builds all sections as planned, the line will be about 38.2 km (23.7 mi) long, with 35 stations: However, the expected length of the completed project may change due to the ongoing review of the alignment of Sections C, D and E.

=== Section A (Alsos Veikou–Goudi) ===
Section A (Greek: Τμήμα Α), also known as Line 4A, consists of a line from Alsos Veikou to Goudi with a length of 12.8 km and 15 stations.

The construction budget of the project amounts to 1.2 billion euros, of which the European Investment Bank will allocate 800 million, while the remaining amount will be paid from the new NSRF and national funds. The depot of Line 4 is planned in Katechaki and Sepolia, as Alsos Veikou was rejected due to the forest area, while in the future, after the final extension, the depot will be relocated to Lykovrysi (at the height of the Holy Monastery of Saint Irene Chrysovalantou).

The following table lists stations of Section A of Line 4, which are under construction: the spelling of the station names on this table, in English and Greek, are according to Elliniko Metro, and all confirmed stations are underground with a layout of two tracks and two side platforms.

†	Terminal station
#	Interchange station

Station English	Station Greek	Image	Municipality	Planned opening	Interchanges and notes	Position
Alsos Veikou^{†}	Άλσος Βεΐκου	—N/a	Galatsi	2032	Also known as "Veikou" (Βεΐκου) for short, the station was previously known as "Tralleon" (Τράλλεων) until November 2005.	38.019015°N 23.756140°E
Galatsi	Γαλάτσι		Galatsi	2032		38.012680°N 23.753030°E
Elikonos	Ελικώνος		Galatsi	2032	Elikonos was a late addition to Section A of Line 4: the residents of the area petitioned Elliniko Metro to add a second station in Kypseli, because of the long distance between Galatsi and Kypseli: Elliniko Metro struggled to find an appropriate location for the extra station because they feared that the elevation of the platforms would be around 50 metres (160 feet) deep. On 16 December 2017, Elliniko Metro agreed to build Elikonos: according to the April 2018 technical drawing, the station will still be one of the deepest on the Metro, at around 35 metres (115 feet).	38.008720°N 23.745575°E
Kypseli	Κυψέλη		Athens	2032		38.002505°N 23.741670°E
Dikastiria	Δικαστήρια		Athens	2032		37.995560°N 23.741075°E
Alexandras	Αλεξάνδρας		Athens	2032		37.990125°N 23.740040°E
Exarcheia	Εξάρχεια		Athens	2032		37.986450°N 23.734880°E
Akadimia^{#}	Ακαδημία		Athens	2032	Interchange with Line 2 at Panepistimio.	37.980800°N 23.734795°E
Kolonaki	Κολωνάκι		Athens	2032		37.976790°N 23.740655°E
Evangelismos^{#}	Ευαγγελισμός		Athens	2032	Interchange with Line 3. As of June 2026, this is the only station where construction works have not yet started.	37.975245°N 23.746370°E
Kaissariani	Καισαριανή		Kaisariani	2032		37.969000°N 23.754780°E
Panepistimioupoli	Πανεπιστημιούπολη		Kaisariani	2032	Panepistimioupoli was originally proposed in 2014 as "Near East" (Νήαρ Ήστ), at a different location.	37.968955°N 23.764900°E
Ilissia	Ιλίσια		Zografou	2032		37.973025°N 23.768725°E
Zografou	Ζωγράφου		Zografou	2032		37.977120°N 23.771030°E
Goudi^{†}	Γουδή		Zografou	2032		37.982040°N 23.769945°E

=== Section B (Goudi–Marousi) ===
Section B (Greek: Τμήμα Β) may consist of a 9.6 km (6.0 mi) line from Goudi to Line 1 at Marousi, with intermediate stations at Katechaki (for Line 3), Faros, Filothei, Sidera, Olympic Stadium, Paradissos (for Suburban Railway trains at Kifisias), and OTE.

Stations on Section B of Line 4
Station	Municipality	Interchanges and notes
Katechaki	Athens	Interchange with Line 3.
Faros	Filothei-Psychiko	
Filothei	Filothei-Psychiko	
Sidera	Chalandri	
Olympic Stadium	Marousi	
Paradissos	Marousi	Interchange with the Athens Suburban Railway at Kifisias.
OTE	Marousi	
Marousi	Marousi	Interchange with Line 1.

=== Section C (Evangelismos–New Government Park) ===
Section C (Greek: Τμήμα Γ), as of November 2021, may consist of a branch from Evangelismos to the new Government Park near Dafni, with intermediate stations at Pangrati and Vyronas: Elliniko Metro previously planned to build the terminus at Ano Ilioupoli.

The extension may form part of Line 5 (Haidari-Kalamaki), with trains initially terminating at Akadimia. Elliniko Metro also announced the possibility of a further southern extension from Dafni towards Kalamaki. A western extension of Line 5 from Akadimia to Koumoundourou Square was also briefly considered in 2014: the alignment of the first section of Line 4 allows for the construction of such extension.

In April 2026, the stations of the section C were presented as components of a new circular Line 5 (purple line), that would include 21-23 stations, to be completed by 2045. The tunnel would branch out of Kaissariani rather the Evangelismos.

Stations on Section C of Line 4
Station	Municipality	Interchanges and notes
Pangrati	Athens	
Vyronas	Vyronas	
New Government Park	Dafni-Ymittos	Interchange with Line 2 at Dafni.

=== Section D (Alsos Veikou–Petroupoli) ===
Section D (Greek: Τμήμα Δ) may consist of a 7.5 km (4.7 mi) line from Alsos Veikou to Petroupoli, with intermediate stations at Plateia Igias in Nea Ionia, Perissos (for Line 1), Nea Filadelfeia, Pyrgos Vasilissis (for Suburban Railway trains), and Ilion (future Line 2). However, the September 2022 Athens Metro Development Plan reroutes Line 4 via Pefkakia instead of Perissos, resulting in the relocation of the station for Nea Filadelfeia.

Stations on Section D of Line 4
Station	Municipality	Interchanges and notes
Nea Ionia	Nea Ionia	"Nea Ionia" is a provisional name for a planned station located at Plateia Igias, south of the Line 1 station.
Pefkakia	Nea Ionia	Interchange with Line 1.
Nea Filadelfeia	Nea Filadelfeia-Nea Chalkidona	Nea Filadelfeia station will be served the Agia Sofia Stadium of AEK Athens. The old planned stop was in Patriarchou Place.
Pyrgos Vasilissis	Agioi Anargyroi-Kamatero	Interchange with the Athens Suburban Railway.
Ilion	Ilion	Interchange with Line 2 (future).
Petroupoli	Petroupoli	

=== Section E (Marousi–Lykovrysi) ===
Section E (Greek: Τμήμα Ε) may consist of a 4.4 km (2.7 mi) line from Marousi to the A1 motorway (National Road), with intermediate stations at Pefki and Lykovrysi. However, the September 2022 Athens Metro Development Plan has Line 1 serving the National Road at Varympompi Junction, with Line 4 terminating at Lykovrysi. The depot of the line will be near of the Monastery of Holy Irene Chrysovalantou.

Stations on Section E of Line 4
Station	Municipality	Interchanges and notes
Lykovrysi	Lykovrysi-Pefki	
Pefki	Lykovrysi-Pefki	

=== Section (Lykovrysi-Acharnes) ===
A possible future Lykovrysi-Acharnes extension was presented in April 2026 that could connect to the future Line 2 Ilion-Kametero-Acharnes extension by 2045.

== Progress ==
The following table lists the progress into construction so far of each station of line 4.

Stations		Preliminary works			Major works	
Stations		Station Occupation	Bypass networks O.C.B*	Archeological works	Station construction	Opening with ΤΒΜ Niki/Athina
1	Alsos Veikou	✔	✔	✔	pending	✔
2	Galatsi	✔	✔	✔	pending	✔
3	Elikonos	✔	✔	✔	pending	✔
4	Kypseli	✔	✔	✔	pending	✔
5	Dikastiria	✔	✔	✔	pending	Until 2026
6	Alexandras	✔	✔	✔	pending	Until 2026
7	Exarcheia	✔	✔	✔		Until 2026
8	Akadimia	✔	✔	✔	pending	Until 2026
9	Kolonaki	✔	✔	✔	pending	Until 2027
10	Evangelismos					✔(Athina), until 2027(Niki)
11	Kaisariani	✔	✔	✔	pending	✔
12	Panepistimioupoli	✔	pending	pending		✔
13	Ilisia	✔	✔	✔	pending	✔
14	Zografou	✔	✔	✔	pending	✔
15	Goudi	✔	pending	pending		✔

*Organisation of common benefit
