= Strefi Hill =

Urban natural park in Athens, Greece

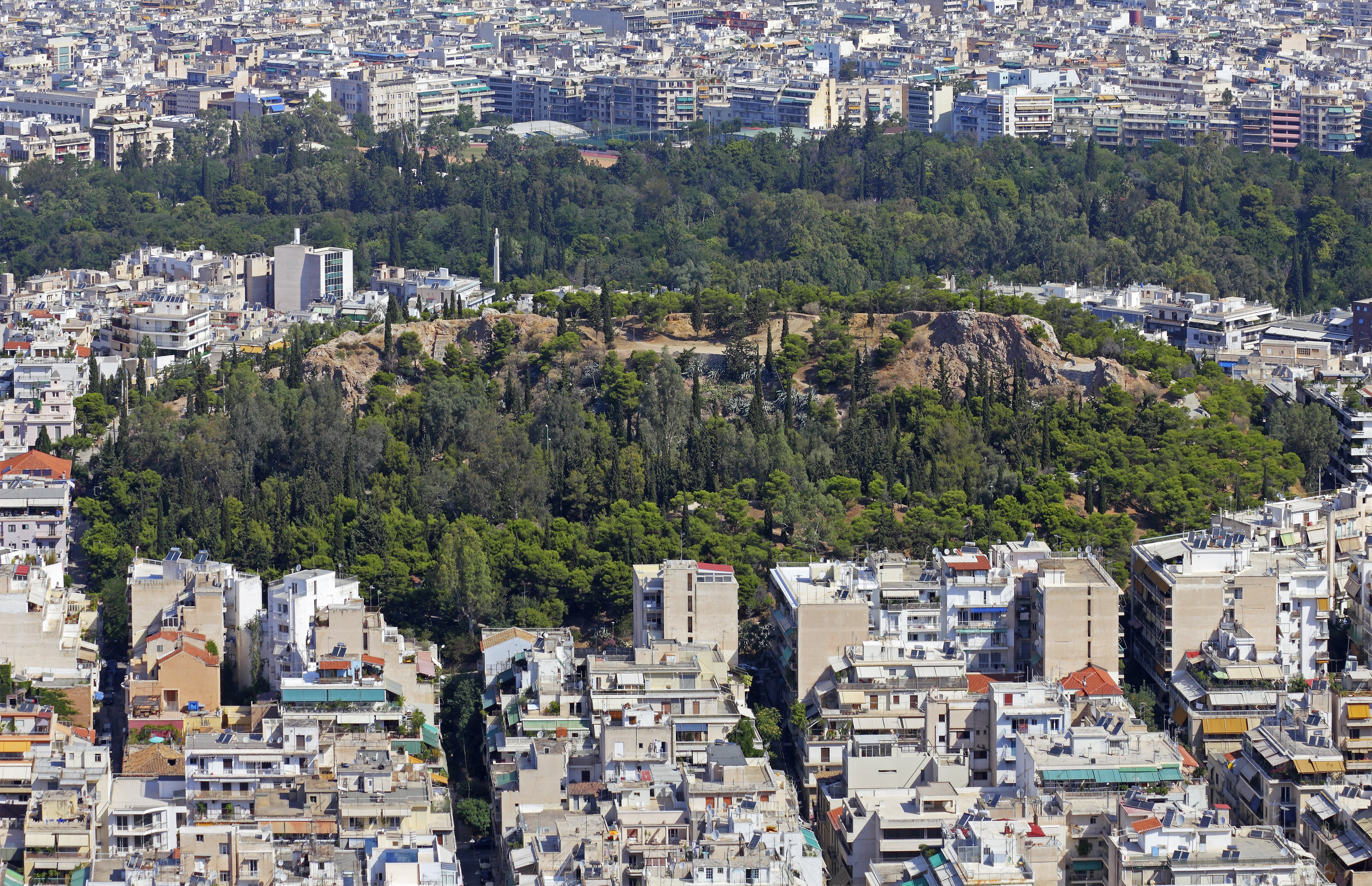
- Strefi Hill, as seen from Lycabettus hill, Athens
- Interactive map of Strefi Hill
- Type: Urban hill park
- Location: Exarcheia, Athens, Greece
- Coordinates: 37°59′17″N 23°44′20″E
- Created: 1938

Strefi Hill (Greek: Λόφος Στρέφη) is a limestone hill and urban natural park in the Greek capital of Athens. It is located on the border of Neapoli neighborhood and Exarcheia, northwest of mount Lykavittos. Its earliest name was Aghesmos (Greek: Αγχεσμός). It is approximately 150 meters above sea level.

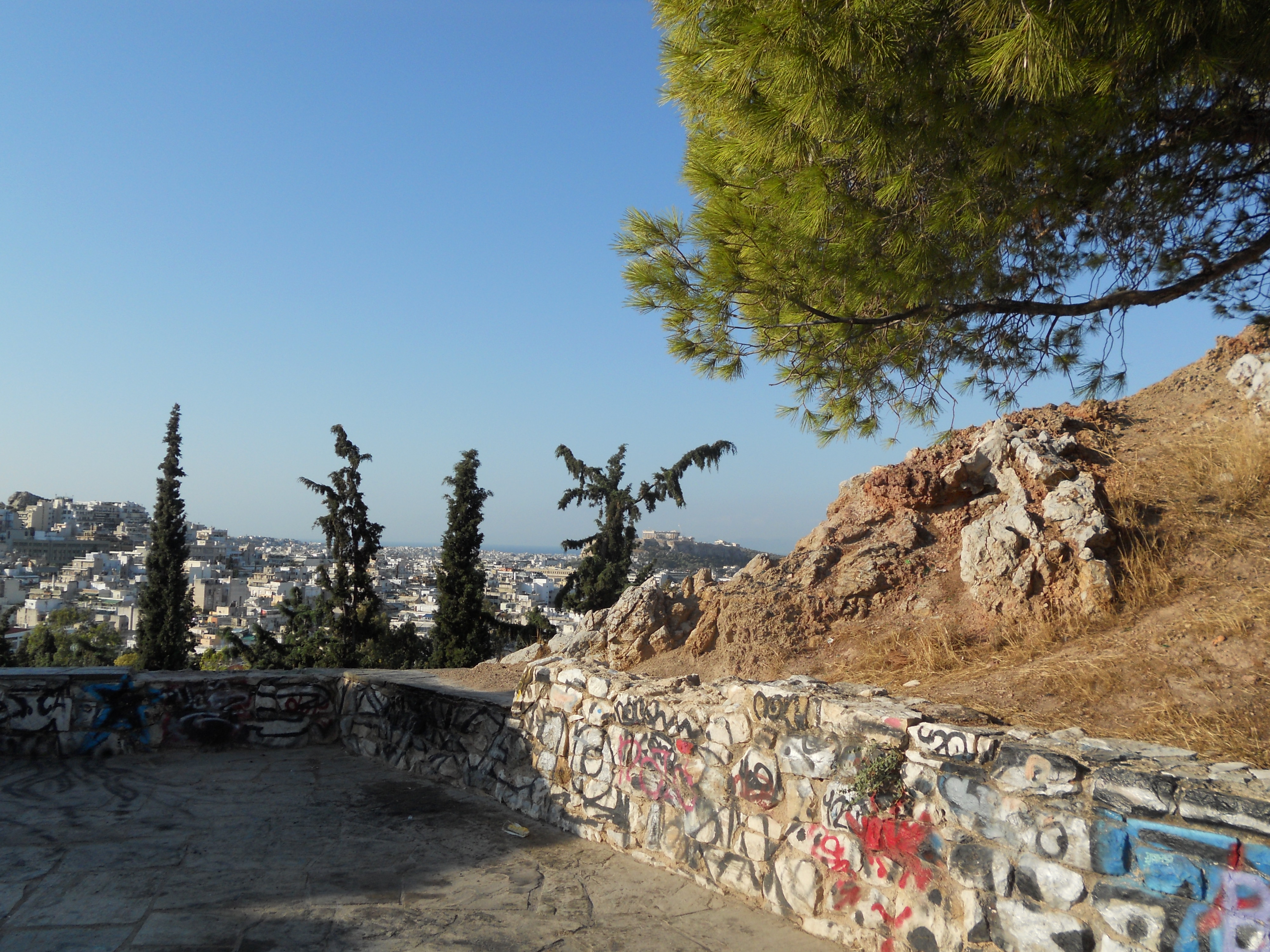
View of Strefi Hill

In the 19th and early 20th century, it belonged to the Strefis family, which operated a stone quarry there until the 1920s. After the quarry was closed and trees were planted, the area was opened to the public in 1938, making it a popular destination for outings. In 1963, the Strefis donated the hill to the city of Athens. Strefi Hill offers lush vegetation, winding paths, and terraces with views of the Acropolis, the city, and Lykavittos. On the hill there is a small open-air theater, a basketball court, a playground, and a cafeteria.
