= Athens refugee squats =

Buildings occupied by migrants in Athens

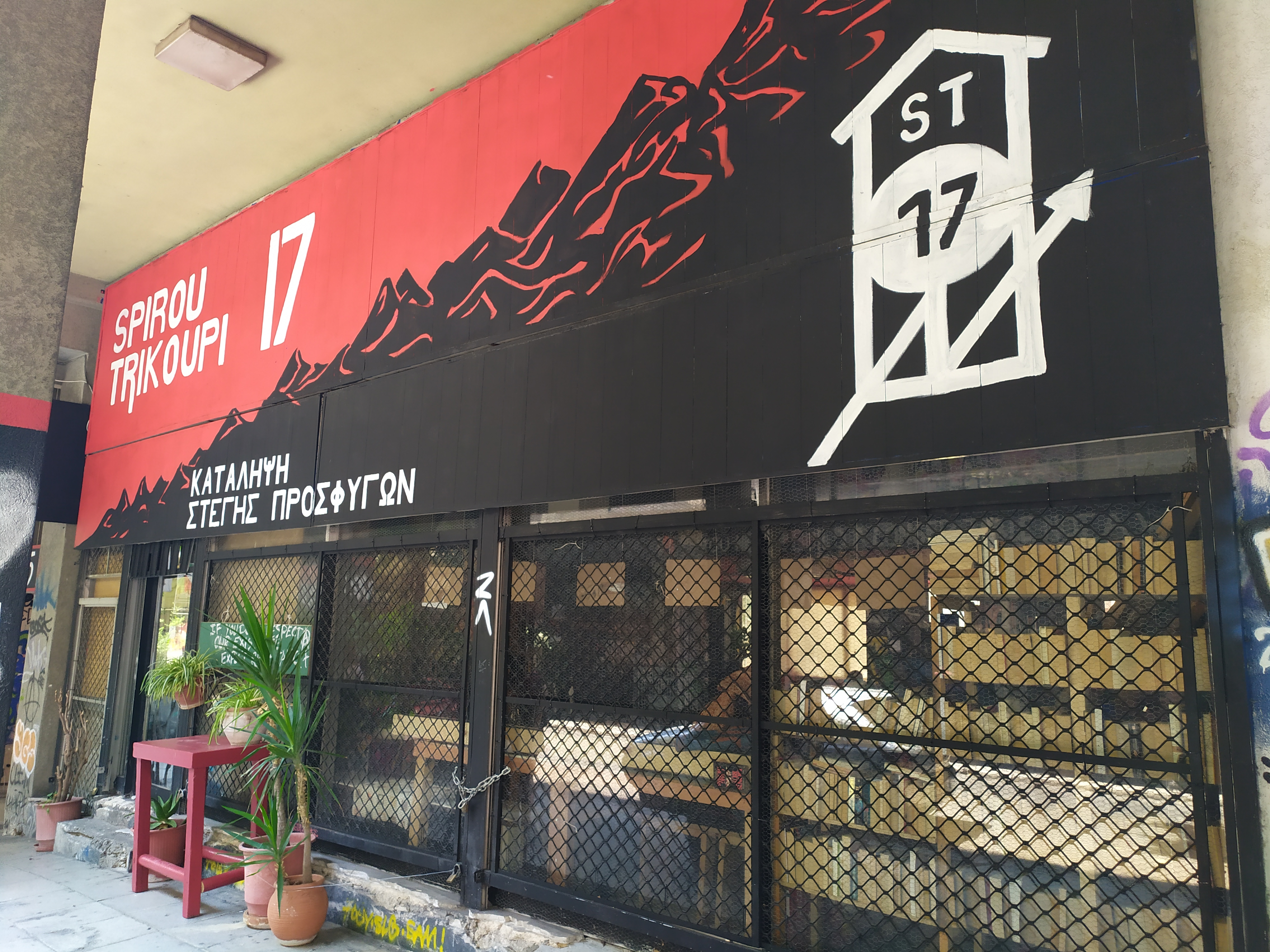
Spirou Trikoupi squat in 2019

Athens refugee squats exist since the 2015 spike in the European migrant crisis. Greece has been a destination for migrants seeking refuge on the European continent via the "Balkan Route." Coalitions of solidarity groups and migrants have established squats throughout Athens (mostly in Exarcheia) to house refugees, demonstrating an alternative to solutions offered by the European Union and NGOs. The squats are grouped together in the Coordination of Refugee Squats. Notable projects included 5th School and City Plaza. In late 2019, the New Democracy party declared it would evict all the squats.

== Background ==
After the 2008 financial crisis, the Greek government-debt crisis prompted the European Troika to implement austerity policies in the form of three distinct memoranda, despite public protest. Widespread poverty and unemployment led to unstable political conditions, and high percentages of housing and storefronts sat unoccupied. Emerging as an alternative to and critique of EU policies and practices, activists in Greece have explored alternative solutions to the crisis of poverty faced by Greek citizens and have established networks of solidarity within the far-left movement.

Representing an unprecedented influx, upwards of one million migrants entered Greece seeking asylum in the European Union between 2015 and 2016, peaking with the arrival of over 200,000 refugees in October 2015. Contributing factors include the escalation of the Syrian civil war and the subsequent closing of the Jordanian and Turkish borders with Syria. EU member states adopted a variety of policy responses. Balkan states were unable to control the migration via administrative mechanisms, opting to open a route deeper into Europe. In August 2015, German Chancellor Angela Merkel opened the German border to asylum-seekers, voluntarily waiving the Dublin Regulation. The 2015 Paris attacks further polarized member state positions on the refugee situation. The Greek government lacked the capacity to process the arriving migrants, and under pressure from the European Commission, Greek Defense Minister Panos Kammenos allowed Frontex to assist with border management and established "hotspots" for processing refugees. It is proposed that this approach ensures the safety of local populations and migrants, by creating safer travel paths into Europe while tightly controlling where they can go. In practice, these administrative solutions have created new dangers for migrants, allowing deportation to unsafe countries and enabling their indefinite detention under poor and sometimes dangerous conditions in official camps.

== History ==
Greek solidarity networks were activated in support of the migrants after the 2015 arrivals. Police evictions of newly arrived migrants from public spaces around Victoria Square drew activists to provide resources and support refugee-led protests and hunger strikes. Nearby Pedion tou Areos Park, occupied by newly arrived migrants, was similarly cleared by police. Following the evictions of the public occupations, solidarity groups assisted in securing abandoned spaces as squats for refugee settlement. In mid-2017, it was estimated that between 2500 and 3000 migrants were housed in squats in Athens. In August 2018, an informal survey suggested there were 850 people (of which total, 30% were children and 40% female) living in Athens' six refugee squats.

Most squats are firmly based on principles of anti-racism, self-management, direct democracy and non-hierarchical organisation. Further the squats can be broken into four categories:

1. Anarchist squats which do not participate with NGOs and state actors, such as Gini, Notara 26 and Themistokleus 58.
2. Self-organised projects mainly run by refugees themselves such as Acharnon, Hotel Oniro and 5th School.
3. Feminist squats used only by women and their children, such as Strephi squat.
4. City Plaza which is run as an explicitly political project by leftist groups, with solidarity from across Europe.

A Greek court ruled in 2017 that three squats (City Plaza, Papouchadiko and Zoodochou Pigis 119) should be evicted. Athens Mayor Giorgos Kaminis backed this decision, saying that the refugee crisis "does not legitimise anyone occupying arbitrarily public or private buildings to house those persons." In protest, 700 people marched from City Plaza to the Ministry of Migration at Klafthmonos Square. Solidarity actions supporting the squats were held outside Greek embassies in Austria, Belgium and Germany.

Several squats were evicted in April 2019, including three refugee squats (Azadi, Clandestina and New Babylon). Fifty evicted refugees set up a tent camp outside the Greek Parliament at Syntagma Square. After a few days they agreed to be moved to the official Elaionas camp. At the end of August 2019, police arrested around 100 people in dawn raids on squats. New mayor Kostas Bakoyannis had promised to take action and criticised previous mayor Kaminis for being too soft. One month previously, the freshly elected new Prime Minister (and uncle of Bakoyannis) Kyriakos Mitsotakis of the New Democracy party had promised to impose order on the district of Exarcheia. This central district houses at least 23 anarchist and migrant squats, and has long been the base for Greece’s radical left social movements. It also experienced drug-related crime, violence and sexual harassment. Local residents living near the squats complained of violence and crime taking place among the migrants. By the end of September 2019, there had been seven evictions including 5th School and Spirou Trikoupi.

The Ministry of Citizen’s Protection released a statement on 20 November 2019 that declared "Those who have illegally occupied buildings, public or private, are urged to evacuate them [...] The deadline for evacuation is fifteen days after the publication of this press release." Commentators termed this an ultimatum and noted that the deadline would run out on 5 December. On this date, Alexandros Grigoropoulos was killed by police, an event which sparked the 2008 Greek riots. When the day came, the squats refused to leave and marches in tribute to Grigoropoulos were held in 18 cities. The evictions were broadened from migrant squats to anarchist social centres When a Christmas tree was erected on Exarcheia Square by New Democracy in December 2019, it was burned down by anarchists in solidarity with people who had been recently evicted. A replacement tree was erected and burnt down several hours later.

In May 2020, the Themistokleus 58 was evicted. About 50 refugees, mainly from the Congo and Syria, were escorted out of the building.

== Coordination of refugee squats ==
The squats of City Plaza, Notara 26, Oniro, Spirou Trikoupi, Arahovis, 5th School, Jasmin School and Acarchon 22 have banded together into an organization called the Coordination of Refugee Squats. In 2016, the Coordination group stated “As long as they try to evict the squats, as long as they build camps and detention centers, as long as there are borders - we will also be there to fight back and fight for a better world! We will show them again what we already proved, we live together, we struggle and we resist together – to defend the dignity of each individual, to defend our principles of solidarity.”

== 5th School ==
The 5th School Likio squat was located in Exarcheia. In 2018 it housed around 200 refugees, mainly families. It is self-managed, with residents volunteering to distribute food donations and to run the squat. Representatives of NGOs are not welcome. The self-organisation means that a Syrian former information technology worker set up the wifi network, an Arabic teacher from Syria gives weekly lessons and someone who studied hotel management in Damascus works in the kitchen.

The squat was evicted in September 2019. Amongst the 143 evicted migrants were women and children from Afghanistan, Iran, Iraq and Syria. They were taken to the Corinth camp, south of Athens. Parents' associations and teachers demanded the return of 12 children who were taken out of local schools.

== City Plaza ==
A coalition of migrant solidarity activists called 'The Solidarity Initiative to Economic and Political Refugees' opened the City Plaza squat on April 22, 2016. The former City Plaza Hotel at 78 Acharnon, in Exarcheia, had closed its doors in 2010. Activists and refugees coordinated to organize and maintain the Hotel as an alternative to state-run camps, focused on promoting the autonomy and political agency of the residents. The City Plaza squat demanded rights for its residents while also producing these rights in the everyday life of the occupation. The squat self-defined itself as Refugee Accommodation and Solidarity Space City Plaza.

Refugees and the associated solidarity groups closed the squat on July 10, 2019, two days after the electoral win of right-wing New Democracy. It was a priority of the newly appointed minister, Michalis Chrisochoidis to force refugees out of the squat. An announcement from the solidarity group stated that refugees were provided shelter elsewhere.

== Notara 26 ==
Housing Squat for Refugees and Immigrants Notara 26 (named for its address) was the first empty building to be opened as a migrant shelter in Exarcheia in September 2015. The former tax administration offices houses people from countries such as Afghanistan, Algeria, Iran, Morocco and Syria. By summer 2016, it had housed 3500 people. It operated on anti-authoritarian principles and refused to co-operate with NGOs. By 2019, it had provided accommodation for over 9000 people.

== Spirou Trikoupi ==
Spirou Trikoupi was a squatted building in Exarcheia. It housed around ninety migrants from places such as Afghanistan, Eritrea, Iran and Kurdistan. The squat was run by a regular weekly assembly and had a bar, a library and classrooms for children. In August 2019, Spirou Trikoupi was the first squat to be raided under the policy of newly elected Kostas Bakoyannis. It was evicted by police and the migrants were taken away at gunpoint. Undocumented people were taken to detention centers and the asylum seekers were put in tent camps.

== Bibliography ==
- Agustín, Óscar García; Jørgensen, Martin Bak (2019). "Autonomous Solidarity: Hotel City Plaza". Solidarity and the 'Refugee Crisis' in Europe. Palgrave Macmillan. pp. 49–72. doi:10.1007/978-3-319-91848-8_3. ISBN 978-3-319-91848-8. S2CID 158234642.
- Ataç, Ilker; Rygiel, Kim; Stierl, Maurice (July 3, 2016). "Introduction: The Contentious Politics of Refugee and Migrant Protest and Solidarity Movements: Remaking Citizenship from the Margins". Citizenship Studies. 20 (5): 527–544. doi:10.1080/13621025.2016.1182681. ISSN 1362-1025. S2CID 148325947.
- Baker, Aryn (November 3, 2016). "Greek Anarchists Are Finding Space for Refugees in Abandoned Hotels". Time.
- BBC World Service (May 13, 2018). "Greece's Haven Hotel". The Documentary Podcast.
- Broadhead, Claudia (November 13, 2018). "Reflections on Volunteering in the Refugee Squats in Athens". No Walls.
- Camilli, Eleonora (June 28, 2017). "One year at City Plaza in Athens". Krytyka Polityczna.
- Crabapple, Molly (June 23, 2017). "This refugee squat represents the best and worst of humanity". Guardian.
- Crabapple, Molly (January 20, 2020). "The Attack on Exarchia, an Anarchist Refuge in Athens". The New Yorker. Archived from the original on January 20, 2020.
- Crellin, Forest (May 5, 2018). ""We Are City Plaza" Exhibit Showing in Paris". Peacock Plume.
- Ekathimerini-December (19 December 2019). "Koukaki squatters say police targeted 'random individuals' in raid". Ekathimerini. Archived from the original on 21 December 2019.
- Ekathimerini-May (18 May 2020). "Police evacuate migrant squat in Exarchia". Ekathimerini.
- Ekathimerini-November (20 November 2019). "Ministry issues ultimatum for squatters to evacuate buildings". Ekathimerini. Archived from the original on 21 December 2019.
- Galgano, Annalisa (December 2017). "Tomorrow's Neighbors: Strategies for Temporary Refugee Integration in Athens, Greece" (PDF). NYU Abu Dhabi Journal of Social Sciences.
- GCT (21 December 2019). "Second Christmas tree is torched in Exarchia Square". Greek City Times. Archived from the original on 21 December 2019.
- Kampouris, Nick (20 November 2019). "Greek Ministry Issues Ultimatum for Squatters to Evacuate All Buildings". Greek Reporter. Archived from the original on 21 December 2019.
- Keep Talking Greece (May 20, 2019). "Refugees and migrants camp at Syntagma Sq demanding housing (UPDATE)". Keep Talking Greece.
- Kotronaki, Loukia (October 2018). "Outside the Doors: Refugee Accommodation Squats and Heterotopy Politics". South Atlantic Quarterly. 117 (4): 914–924. doi:10.1215/00382876-7166080. ISSN 0038-2876. S2CID 150095405.
- Lafazani, Olga (October 2018). "Homeplace Plaza: Challenging the Border between Host and Hosted". South Atlantic Quarterly. 117 (4): 896–904. doi:10.1215/00382876-7166043. ISSN 0038-2876. S2CID 151165950.
- Lafazani, Olga (2017). "Intervention – "1.5 year City Plaza: A Project on the Antipodes of Bordering and Control Policies"". Antipode Foundation.
- Maniatis, Giorgos (October 2018). "From a Crisis of Management to Humanitarian Crisis Management". South Atlantic Quarterly. 117 (4): 905–913. doi:10.1215/00382876-7166068. ISSN 0038-2876. S2CID 76653388.
- Mitchell, Katharyne; Sparke, Matthew (August 21, 2018). "Hotspot geopolitics versus geosocial solidarity: Contending constructions of safe space for migrants in Europe" (PDF). Environment and Planning D: Society and Space. 38 (6): 1046–1066. doi:10.1177/0263775818793647. ISSN 0263-7758. S2CID 149838512.
- Manoussaki-Adamopoulou-A, Ioanna; King, Alex (26 August 2019). "Greek police raid Athens squats and arrest migrants". The Guardian. Archived from the original on 21 December 2019.
- Manoussaki-Adamopoulou-B, Ioanna; King, Alex (26 August 2019). "Inside Exarcheia: the self-governing community Athens police want rid of". The Guardian. Archived from the original on 21 December 2019.
- Moldovan, Ioana (7 January 2016). "A refugee New Year in a Greek anarchist shelter". www.aljazeera.com.
- Psaropoulos, John (30 September 2019). "Refugee eviction causes fury in Greece". Al Jazeera. Archived from the original on 21 December 2019.
- Strickland, Patrick (June 23, 2017). "Greeks protest government crackdown on refugee squats". Al Jazeera.
- Tsavdaroglou, Charalampos; Kaika, Maria (2021). "The refugees' right to the centre of the city: City branding versus city commoning in Athens". Urban Studies. 59 (6): 1130–1147. doi:10.1177/0042098021997009. hdl:11245.1/0e0260bc-c561-4839-a143-88001ac787e0. S2CID 233631178.
- Tsavdaroglou, Charalampos (2018). "The Newcomers' Right to the Common Space: The case of Athens during the refugee crisis". ACME: An International Journal for Critical Geographies. 17 (2): 376–401.
- "Greece's new police state". New Internationalist. 30 November 2019. Archived from the original on 21 December 2019.
- Welcome United. "City Plaza Hotel – Athen refugee accommodation and solidarity space city plaza". Welcome-united.
