= City Plaza =

Former squat in Athens, Greece (2016–2019)

City Plaza was an autonomously run, self-organised squat for refugees in Athens, Greece, based in the former City Plaza Hotel. It was one of a number of Athens refugee squats and self-defined itself as Refugee Accommodation and Solidarity Space City Plaza. It was occupied in 2016 and chose to close in 2019.

== Beginnings ==
The City Plaza Hotel at 78 Acharnon in Athens, shut its doors in 2010, sitting empty until it was reoccupied as a squat for refugees on April 22, 2016. A coalition of migrant solidarity activists called 'The Solidarity Initiative to Economic and Political Refugees' assisted in opening the squat. It was located in the Agios Panteleimonas neighbourhood, where the far-right Golden Dawn party was formed.

Activists and refugees coordinated to organize and maintain the Hotel as an alternative to state-run camps, focused on promoting the autonomy and political agency of the residents. The City Plaza squat also served to familiarize refugee-residents and Athens locals through everyday transactions in the local markets, and as a hub for radical activity, including mobilizations to integrate refugee children into existing education and healthcare institutions. With the counter-example of the squat itself, City Plaza contested the narrative that there is no alternative to refugee camps. It also demanded rights for its residents while also producing these rights in the everyday life of the occupation.

In its first year, City Plaza hosted around 100 families, mainly from Afghanistan and Syria, also Iraqis, Kurds and Pakistanis. By 2017, there were 400 people from ten different countries, living in 110 rooms in the former hotel. Two activist groups involved in the space were Diktio (Network for Political and Social Rights), a group working on the issues of anti-nationalism, political prisoners and migration struggles, and Aren/Onra, a youth collective which was part of Syriza before leaving the coalition after the 2015 referendum. The squat was entirely funded by private donations. It self-defined itself as Refugee Accommodation and Solidarity Space City Plaza.

== Amenities ==
The squat housed an array of resident-run amenities, including a clinic, communal kitchen and cafeteria, a library, a kindergarten, Greek, English, and German language classes, workshops, computer classes, and basic services such as a dentist, pharmacy, and hairdresser. A working group of residents and activists convened to select occupants for available rooms. Another 15 rooms were provided for those who work in solidarity with the project. Adult residents were required to work one shift cooking or cleaning weekly. The kitchen serves 800 meals every day.

On arrival, refugees filled in a form saying what their legal status was and what help they required. Based on this information, medical and legal teams provided assistance.

== Legal status ==
In contrast to most refugee squats, City Plaza is privately owned, by former actress Aliki Papahela, who inherited it. She claimed in 2016 that she had been in the middle of selling the building and the occupation prevented her moving forward. She also said she was unable to pay the property taxes.

== Closure ==
Refugees and the associated solidarity group closed the squat on 10 July 2019, two days after the electoral win of the right-wing New Democracy party. It was a priority of the newly elected minister, Michalis Chrisochoidis to evict the squat. An announcement from the solidarity group stated that refugees had been provided with shelter elsewhere. Further, the decision to close the squat had been first proposed in May 2018 and since June 2018 the squat had not been taking in new inhabitants.

== In culture ==
- We are City Plaza was an exhibition held in Paris, in April 2018. It was set up by two photographers. They lent cameras for two weeks to 18 residents, with ages between 8 and 38. The residents shot images from their daily life and these were shown in the exhibition.
- The BBC World Service produced a thirty minute documentary called Greece's Haven Hotel about City Plaza in 2018.

== Bibliography ==
- Agustín, Óscar García; Jørgensen, Martin Bak (2019). "Autonomous Solidarity: Hotel City Plaza". Solidarity and the 'Refugee Crisis' in Europe. Palgrave Macmillan. pp. 49–72. doi:10.1007/978-3-319-91848-8_3. ISBN 978-3-319-91848-8. S2CID 158234642.
- Baker, Aryn (November 3, 2016). "Greek Anarchists Are Finding Space for Refugees in Abandoned Hotels". Time.
- BBC World Service (May 13, 2018). "Greece's Haven Hotel". The Documentary Podcast.
- Camilli, Eleonora (June 28, 2017). "One year at City Plaza in Athens". Krytyka Polityczna.
- Crellin, Forest (May 5, 2018). ""We Are City Plaza" Exhibit Showing in Paris". Peacock Plume.
- Kotronaki, Loukia (October 2018). "Outside the Doors: Refugee Accommodation Squats and Heterotopy Politics". South Atlantic Quarterly. 117 (4): 914–924. doi:10.1215/00382876-7166080. ISSN 0038-2876. S2CID 150095405.
- Lafazani, Olga (October 2018). "Homeplace Plaza: Challenging the Border between Host and Hosted". South Atlantic Quarterly. 117 (4): 896–904. doi:10.1215/00382876-7166043. ISSN 0038-2876. S2CID 151165950.
- Lafazani, Olga (2017). "Intervention – "1.5 year City Plaza: A Project on the Antipodes of Bordering and Control Policies"". Antipode Foundation.
- Welcome United. "City Plaza Hotel – Athen refugee accommodation and solidarity space city plaza". Welcome-united.
