= Exarcheia Square =

Building in Exarcheia, Athens, Greece

Coordinates: 37°59′11.6″N 23°44′5.5″E

- Πλατεία Εξαρχείων
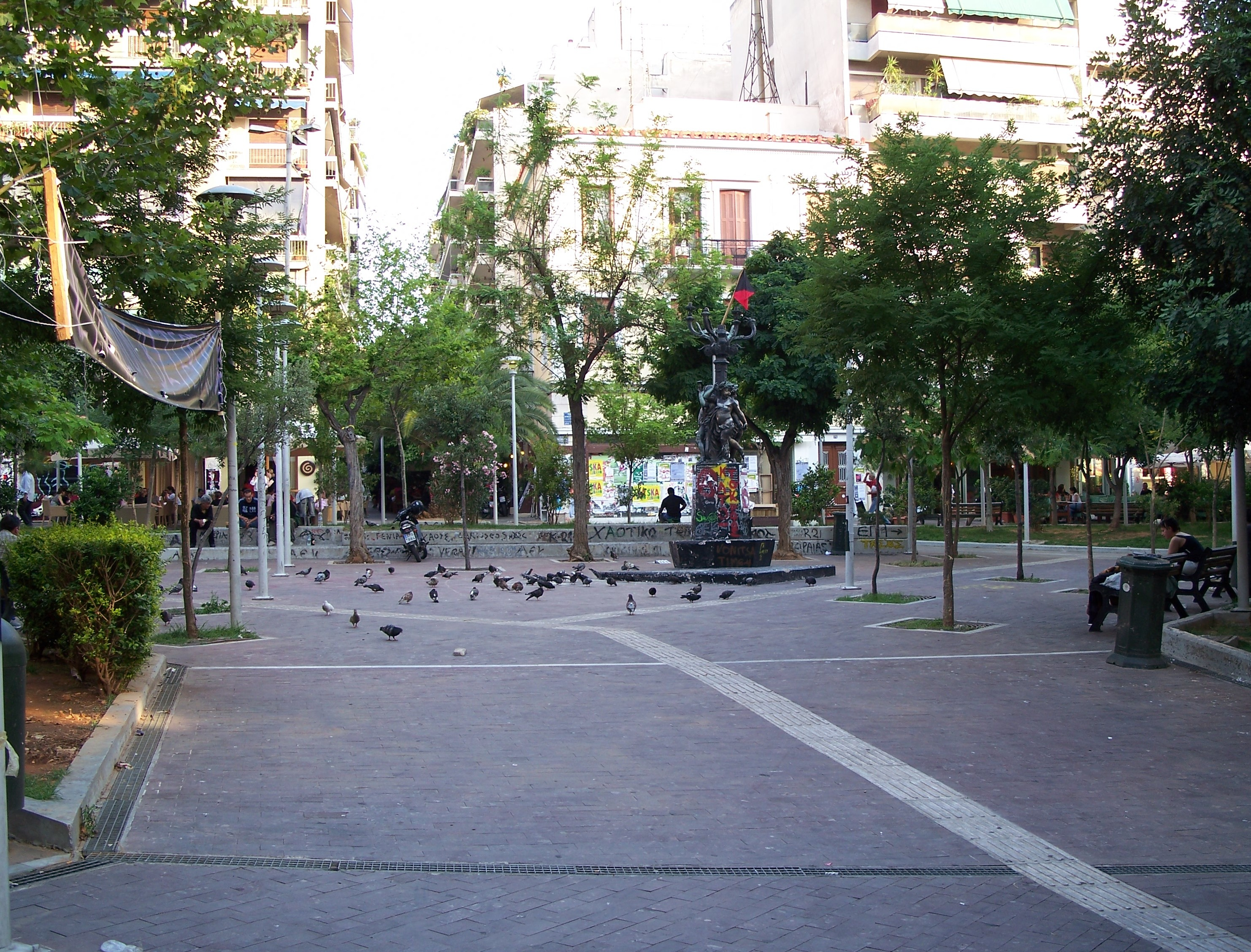

General information
- Location: Exarcheia, Athens

Exarcheia Square is located in the Exarcheia neighborhood of Athens and it is considered the center of the neighborhood. The square is a gathering place for people of all ages, but especially young people, and many activities organized by anti-authoritarian or anti-establishment groups take place there.

The center of the square was decorated until September 2022 by a sculpture called "Τρεις Έρωτες" ("Three Loves"), dated back to 1909. The sculpture was removed due to the works for the construction of a metro station for the Line 4 of the Athens metro. The construction of the aforementioned station has sparked controversies and a series of protests against it, on grounds of destroying part of the area's few green spaces and contributing to the gentrification of a historically politically active neighborhood.
