= Euonymeia =

Euonymeia Ευωνύμεια Trachones, Ano Kalamaki
- Neighborhood of Alimos, Greece
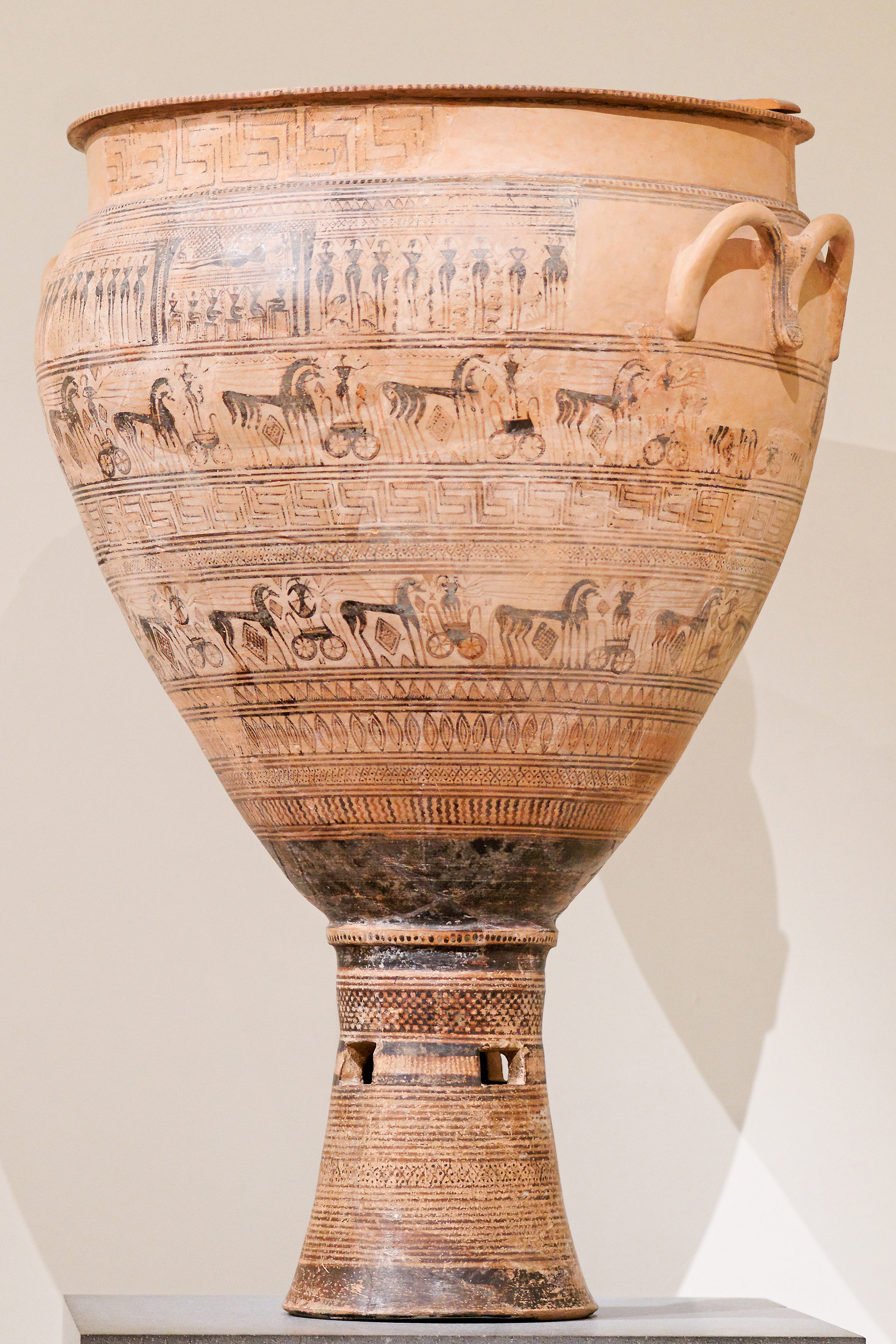
- Krater from the Trachones workshop of Euonymeia (ca. 725 BCE) on display at the Metropolitan Museum of Art

- Location within Greece
- Coordinates: 37°55′12″N 23°44′24″E
- Country: Greece
- Region: Attica
- Regional unit: South Athens
- Municipality: Alimos
- Settled: Neolithic period
- Named for: Euonymus
- Postal code: 17 456
- Area code: 210 99

Euonymeia (Greek: Ευωνύμεια, Evonímia), also known by its medieval name Trachones (Greek: Τράχωνες), and by its modern colloquial Ano Kalamaki (Greek: Άνω Καλαμάκι, Upper Kalamaki), is a historic settlement and currently a residential neighborhood within the suburban town of Alimos in the southern part of the Athens urban area, Greece. The area is an inland part of the south Athenian plain, situated between the foothills of Mount Hymettus and the southern coastal zone of Athens on the Saronic Gulf. The land is characterized by limestone hills and streams running from Hymettus toward the coast.

The area displays some of the earliest urban settlements in Europe, with archeological sites showing continuous development from the Neolithic and Bronze Age periods. Major archeological finds include Early Helladic fortifications, Mycenaean era workshops and necropolis, a classical era amphitheatre, and Early Christian and Byzantine temples. Some of the earliest and best preserved specimens of Athenian Geometric pottery have been attributed to the Trachones workshop and are featured in museum collections, including two kraters on display at the Metropolitan Museum of Art in New York City.

At its peak during the 5th and 4th centuries BCE, the area was the center of the Deme of Euonymos, one of the most populous communities of Ancient Athens. Euonymos had its own acropolis, theatre, industrial installations, and religious festivals. Several Euonymeians played a major role in Athenian politics and civic life, most notably in the trial of Socrates and in the expeditions of the Peloponnesian War.

== Etymology ==
The name Euonymeia is documented in the Ethnica (Greek: Ἐθνικά), the gazetteer by 6th century CE scholar Stephanus of Byzantium, considered the earliest authoritative work on Mediterranean toponyms. Therein, Stephanus attributes the name to Euonymus of Greek Mythology –son of Gaia with either Uranus or Cephissus. The name itself derives from the Greek root-words eû (Greek: εὖ) "good, well", and onoma (Greek: όνομα) "name". Alternative interpretations for the origin of the name are that it is a direct reference to the area being "well named" or "of good repute", or that it comes from the spindle tree Euonymus europaeus. The medieval name Trachones derives from the word trachoni (Greek: τραχώνι) meaning "rock", derived from the ancient Greek adjective trachys (Greek: τραχύς) meaning "coarse". The modern colloquial name Ano Kalamaki (Upper Kalamaki) arose in 1968 when Euonymeia was administratively linked with the coastal settlement of Kalamaki to the west, creating the contemporary Municipality of Alimos.

== History ==
Systematic archaeological excavation of the area has not been conducted, yet numerous construction projects during the intensive urban development of the later half of the twentieth century led to important circumstantial discoveries, which shed light on the historic timeline of the settlement.

=== Prehistoric and Bronze Age ===
The hills of Euonymeia, together with the adjacent coastal promontory of Agios Kosmas, the ancient Akra Kolias, are the two most important sites of Neolithic and Aegean Bronze Age development in the area of Athens prior to ca. 3000 BCE. Ceramics and obsidian tools found on both sites were identified as originating from the island of Melos, indicating close ties of these settlements with the obsidian-rich islands of the cycladic civilization. The commonality of findings in Agios Kosmas and Euonymeia suggests that the two settlements were functionally linked coastal and inland communities.

The earliest signs of prehistoric settlement in Euonymeia were recognized in the 1950s and '60s at the Kontopigado site. During expansion work on the Vouliagmenis Avenue, neolithic era masonry was identified around a small hill rising 6 metres (20 ft) above the surrounding ground. In 2012, prehistoric masonry, which has yet to be dated, was recognized on the summit of Pan's Hill (Greek: Λόφος Πανί, romanized: Lofos Pani), the highest elevation point in Euonymeia. Several thousand obsidian tool specimens have been collected from both Kontopigado, and Pan's Hill. Findings from this first settlement period come to an abrupt end around 2000 BCE, indicating a catastrophic event theorized to involve Pelasgian invaders.

Excavations at construction sites adjacent to the Kontopigado mound in the 1980s and '90s led to the discovery of an Early Helladic settlement (third millennium BCE), and an overlying Mycenaean complex dated from Late Helladic IIIB to Late Helladic IIIC (ca. 1300 BCE), marking the second period of intense development in Euonymeia. A Mycenaean chamber tomb from the same Late Helladic era was identified together with funerary pottery in the current Geroulanou estate. In 2006, work on the Alimos Metro station 300 metres (980 ft) South from the mound unearthed a large workshop complex from the same era with installations for ceramic production, including a kiln and potters wheel. This workshop included hydraulic installations with wells and water conduits used in the processing of flax into textiles for the production of table wares, and for sails and ropes used on Mycenaean era ships. Altogether the Mycenaean complex at Kontopigado, 5 kilometres (3.1 mi) south of the Mycenaean Palace on the Acropolis of Athens, is one of the largest of its kind found to date. This Bronze Age community and installations at Euonymeia are thought to have had close links to the central palatial authority in Athens, possibly supplying the sails and ropes for the 50 ships that Athens is said to have contributed to the Trojan War.

=== Geometric ===
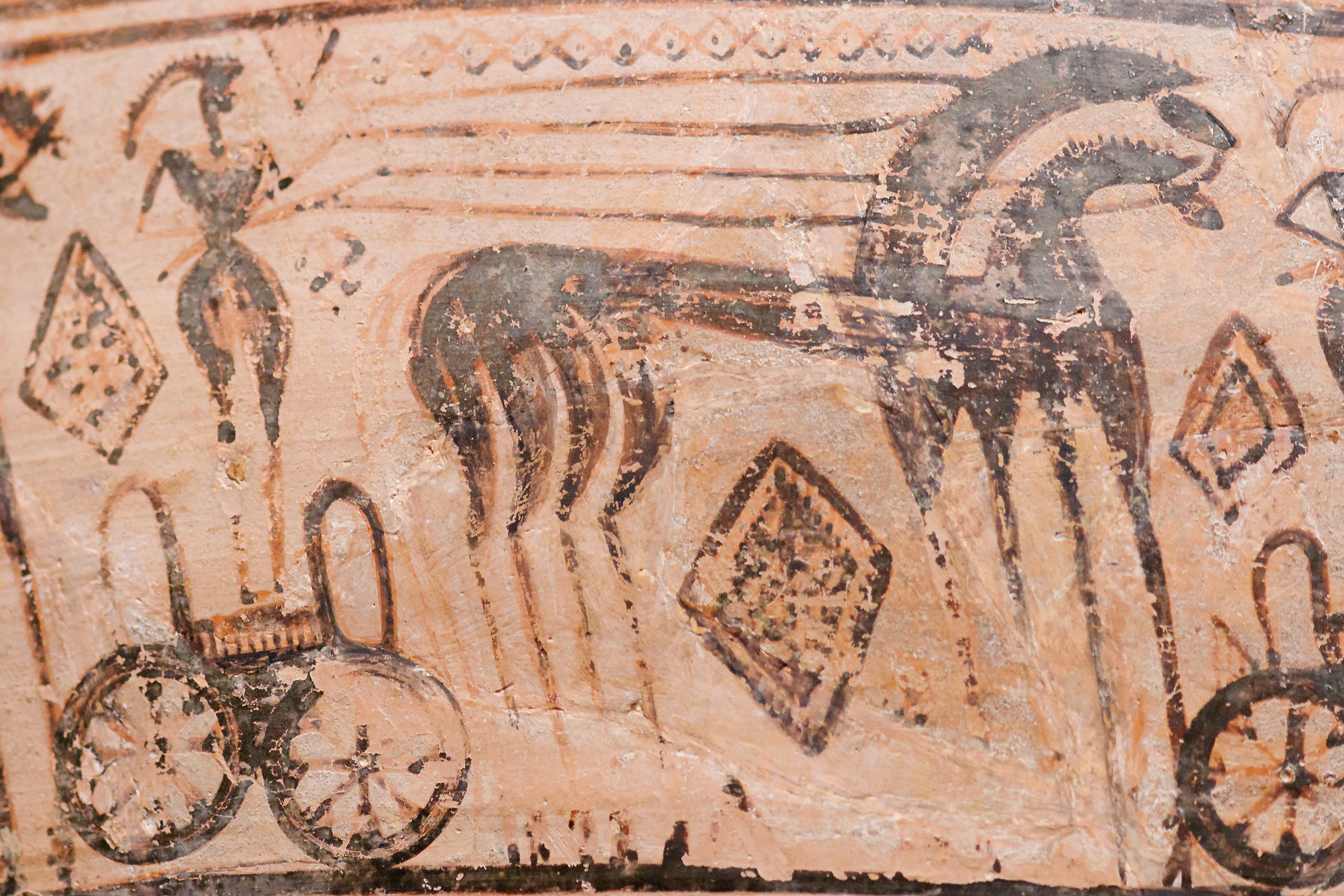
Detail of a Geometric krater attributed to the Trachones workshop (Metropolitan Museum of Art, New York)

During the Geometric period of the Hellenic Dark Ages (10th to 8th centuries BCE), the area continued to be inhabited, with notable pottery production from the Trachones workshop. Geometric era finds in Euonymeia concentrate 500 metres (1,600 ft) to the West of the Myceneaen site at Kontopigado, on a hill by the Trachones stream on the current Geroulanou Estate. While excavations have not yet been performed, the Geroulanou Estate is presumed to have been the site of the Acropolis of Euonymeia, based on surface finds of 8th - 7th century BCE fortifications. Geometric graves and pottery have been found around the estate providing evidence that unlike in Athens and neighboring communities, Euonymeia, together with Anavyssos further south, were peculiar in practicing cremation as the main burial rite during this period. Nonetheless, the 8th-century ceremonial Kraters attributed to the Trachones workshop and used in burial tombs throughout Geometric Greece are considered some of the best examples of Athenian Geometric Pottery that have been discovered to date. In 1914, the Metropolitan Museum of Art in New York City acquired two specimens, which are on display as part of its permanent collection of Greek and Roman Art.

=== Classical: Deme of Euonymos ===
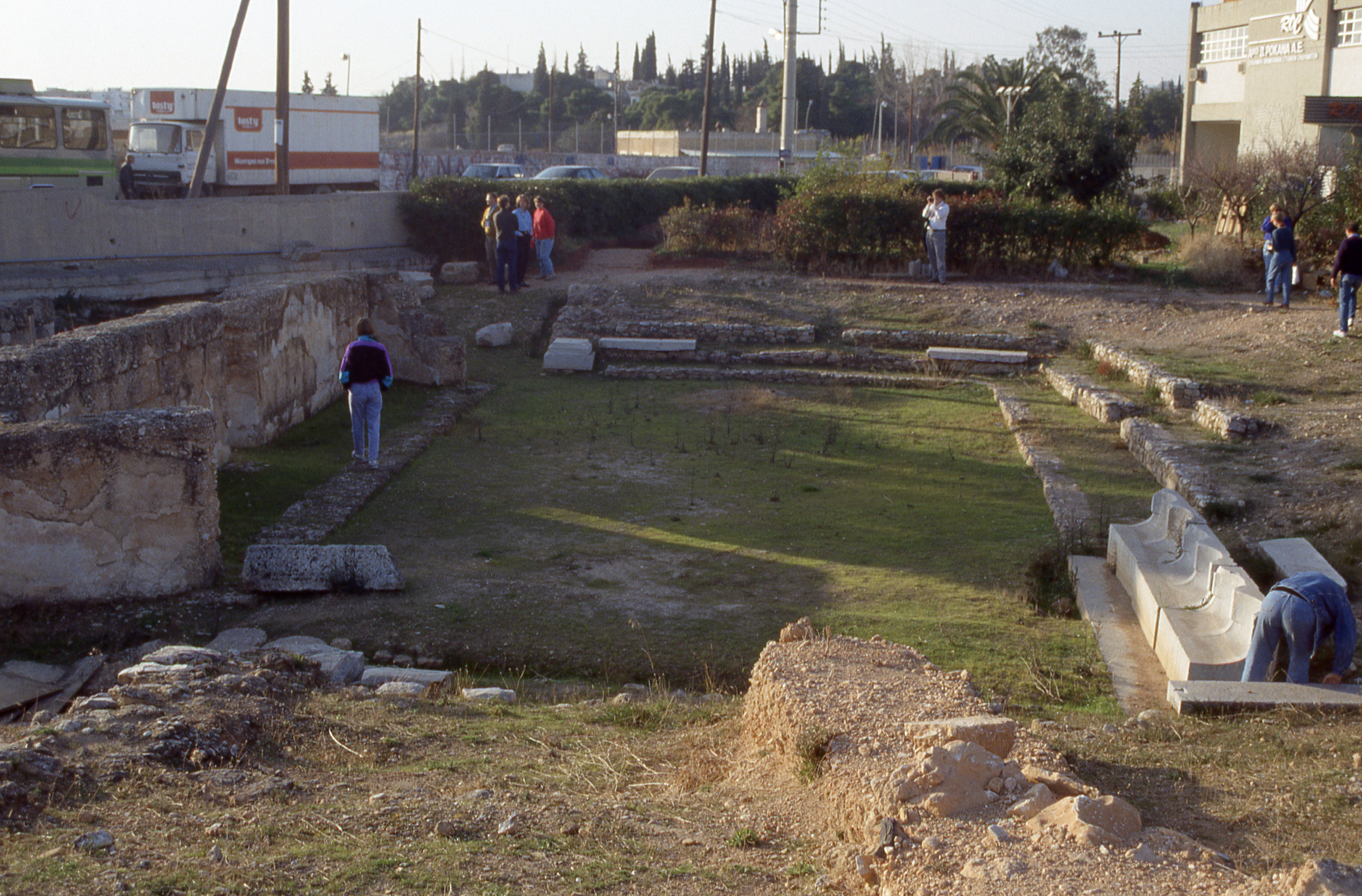
The orchestra of the theatre at the deme site of Euonymos

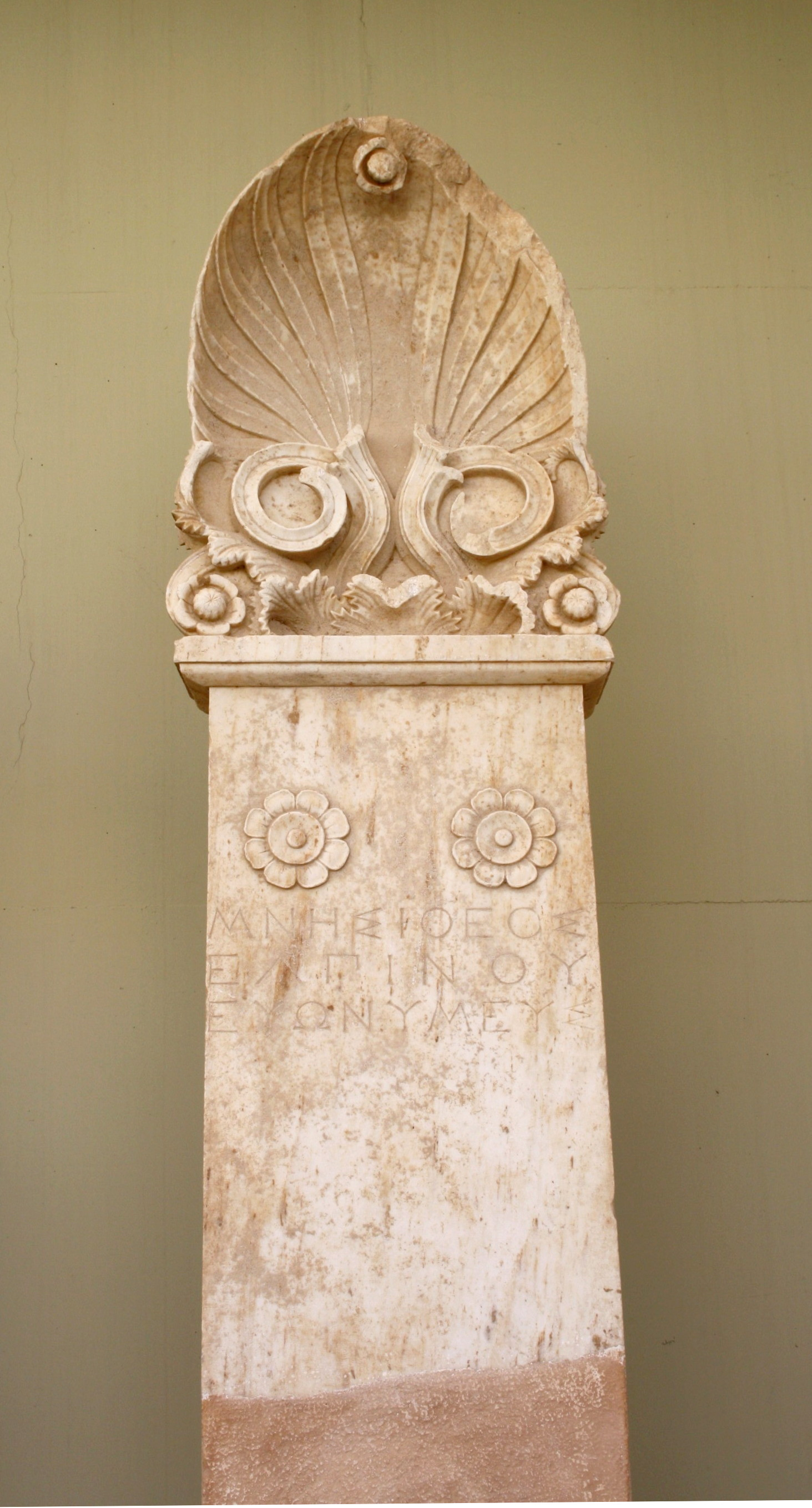
Stele inscribed "Mnesitheos, son of Elpinos, the Euonymeian". 330/320 BC, Archaeological Museum of Piraeus.

The area was recognized as the site of the ancient Deme of Euonymos (Greek: Δῆμος Εὐώνυμος) in 1975 when construction work uncovered a 4th-century BCE theatre. An inscription to the god Dionysus identified it as the Euonymos Theatre, previously known only from ancient texts as one of the Deme Theatres of Athens. The theatre at Euonymos was constructed in the mid 5th century BCE (making it one of the earliest known Deme theatres) with Hymettian Marble from quarries in nearby Mount Hymettus. It had an estimated capacity of 2000–3000 spectators and is unique among ancient theatres found in Greece owing to the rectangular shape of its orchestra. The theatre was destroyed during the Chremonidean War of the 260s BCE and never rebuilt. Two headless statues of Dionysus were found on the site of the theatre, and together with the discovery in 2012 of Dionysian depictions on Red-figure pottery from the area, and undated finds from the Kontopigado site of clay figures seemingly representing Maenades, the rabid female companions of Dionysus, suggest a possible early affiliation of Euonymeia with the Cult of Dionysus and Pan.

The town was on the Urban Way (Greek: Αστική Ὁδός, romanized: Astiki Hodós), the major ancient road linking Athens to the Temple of Poseidon at Sounion, and the all-important silver mines at Laurium. Remains of the Urban Way have been unearthed in multiple sites along the modern Vouliagmenis Avenue, positioning this ancient thoroughfare adjacent to the most important installations in Euonymos. The old Mycenaean hydraulic installations 300 metres (980 ft) Northeast of the theatre show continued use through the classical era. In this period, water flowing through the installations from the Trachones stream and wells were used primarily for agriculture, stockbreeding, and cottage industries. The hill with Geometric-era fortifications on the Geroulanou Estate 300 metres (980 ft) Northwest of the theatre is thought to have been the site of the Acropolis of Euonymos. Construction in the 1960s and work on the Argyroupoli Metro station 1.5 kilometres (0.93 mi) South of the theatre in 2003 uncovered a cemetery at the Hasani site with over 150 graves dating from the 7th to the 4th centuries BCE, and inscriptions identifying it as the cemetery of the Deme of Euonymos. Together, these findings conclusively position the center and extent of the classical Deme of Euonymos as a continuation of the early Euonymeia settlements.

The Deme of Euonymos was designated as one of the 139 Athenian Demes by the Reform of Cleisthenes. Euonymos was an "urban" (asty) deme of the Erechtheis tribe, the first in the hierarchy of the Athenian democracy as descending from Erechtheus, the autochthonous founder of Athens. The Deme contributed 10 bouleutai (increased to 12 in 306 BCE) to the 500 member-strong Boule, and as such was one of Athens' largest demes. Several Euonymeians were notable public officials in Ancient Athens, such as Hieropoios Eunomos of Euonymon, and high-ranking military figures associated with the Peloponnesian Wars, including Taxiarch Strombichides, Nauarch Diotimos of Euonymon, and Strategoi Autocles and Anytus, the latter also known as a main prosecutor in the trial of Socrates.

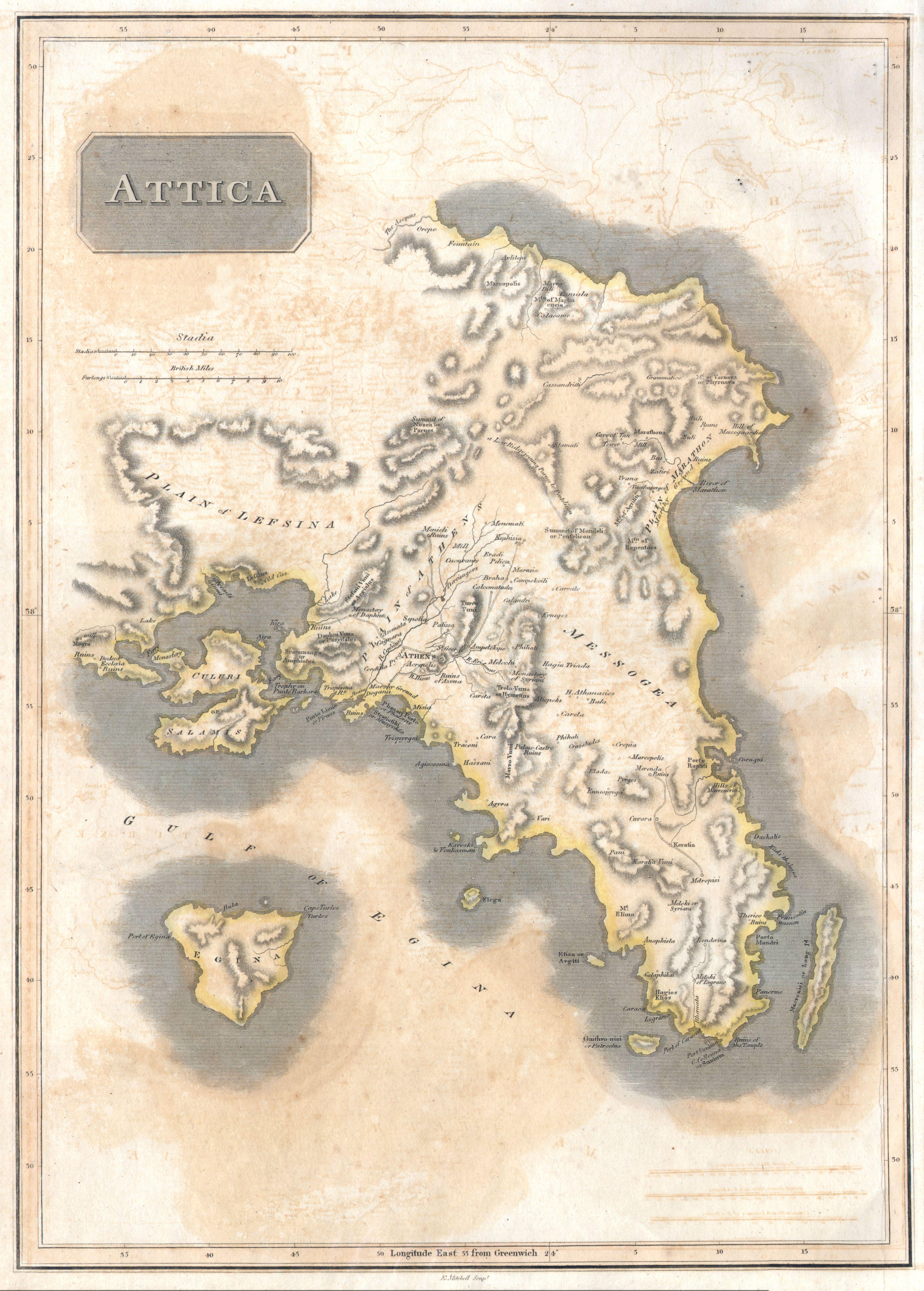
1814 map of Scottish cartographer John Thomson, indicating the village of Traconi in Ottoman Attica

=== Medieval ===
Euonymeia declined in medieval times together with Athens after Christian reforms brought on the Decline of Greco-Roman polytheism. At some point during this time the settlement's name changed to the village of Trachones. Nonetheless, it retained urban settlement throughout the Early Christian and Byzantine eras as testified by the ruins of the Paleochristian Basilica of the Holy Apostles (ca. 7th-9th centuries CE) that can be found 200 metres (660 ft) North of Euonymos Theatre in the courtyard of the contemporary Church of the Life-giving Spring of Trachones.

During the later Middle Ages, Athens was conquered by the Fourth Crusade, which established the 13th-century crusader state of the Duchy of Athens. During this time, in defiance of the Roman Catholic allegiance to the Frankish lord of Athens Othon de la Roche, the Orthodox church of the "Presentation of Mary of Trachones" (Greek: Εισοδίων Θεοτόκου Τραχώνων, Isodíon Theotókou Trachónon) was constructed 300 metres (980 ft) West of the Euonymos Theatre. This church is currently in operation within the grounds of the Geroulanou Estate, making it one of the oldest continuously operational churches in Athens.

After the invasion of Greece by the Ottoman Turks, the area of Trachones was turned into a Chiflik, and administered according to the Ottoman feudal system, with the local population becoming mandatory land peasants (koligoi). The church of the Presentation of Mary appears to remain the center of the area's civic life in the following centuries of Ottoman rule.

=== 19th and 20th centuries ===
Modern written use of the toponym Trachones appears right before the Greek Revolution in an 1820 tax record of villages in Attica, while its location, corresponding to the area of Euonymeia, is revealed in 19th-century maps, including John Thomson's 1814 map of Attica (therein labeled as Traconi), and an 1881 map from the German Archeological Institute. During the preceding years, the Trachones Estate, corresponding to a large part of what is now South Athens, was sold to Mufti Hamza, an 18th-century Muslim religious leader of Athens. Records show that the feudal estate had a small population of landless farmers, and that ownership passed on through the Mufti's progeny. In 1912, the settlement of Trachones was incorporated into the Municipality of Athens, while the land of the estate was sold in 1918 by the Greek State to the Geroulanou family for 680,000 drachma. In 1952, a large part of the estate was converted from farm to urban plots, including land for the creation of the Hellenicon Airport. This led to a rapid urbanization following the expanding urban sprawl of the Greek capital, and to the establishment of the current residential community. In 1968 the modern Municipality of Alimos was established, administratively linking the community of Trachones with the coastal community of Kalamaki 2.5 kilometres (1.6 mi) to the West, giving rise to the term Ano Kalamaki (upper Kalamaki) to refer to the area of Euonymeia.

== Geography ==
The neighborhood is approximately bounded by the avenues of Vouliagmenis in the East, Ionias in the North and West, and Alimou in the South, and includes the "Alimos" Metro station. The area is rocky, a feature that gave it its medieval name, Trachones. The main physical features of Euonymeia are several small limestone hills, the largest of which is Pan's Hill (Lofos Pani), and the Trachones stream that runs from the Western slopes of Hemyttus, through Euonymeia, to the Saronic Gulf at Alimos beach. Mount Hymettus to the East is the dominant backdrop visible from most areas of the neighborhood.

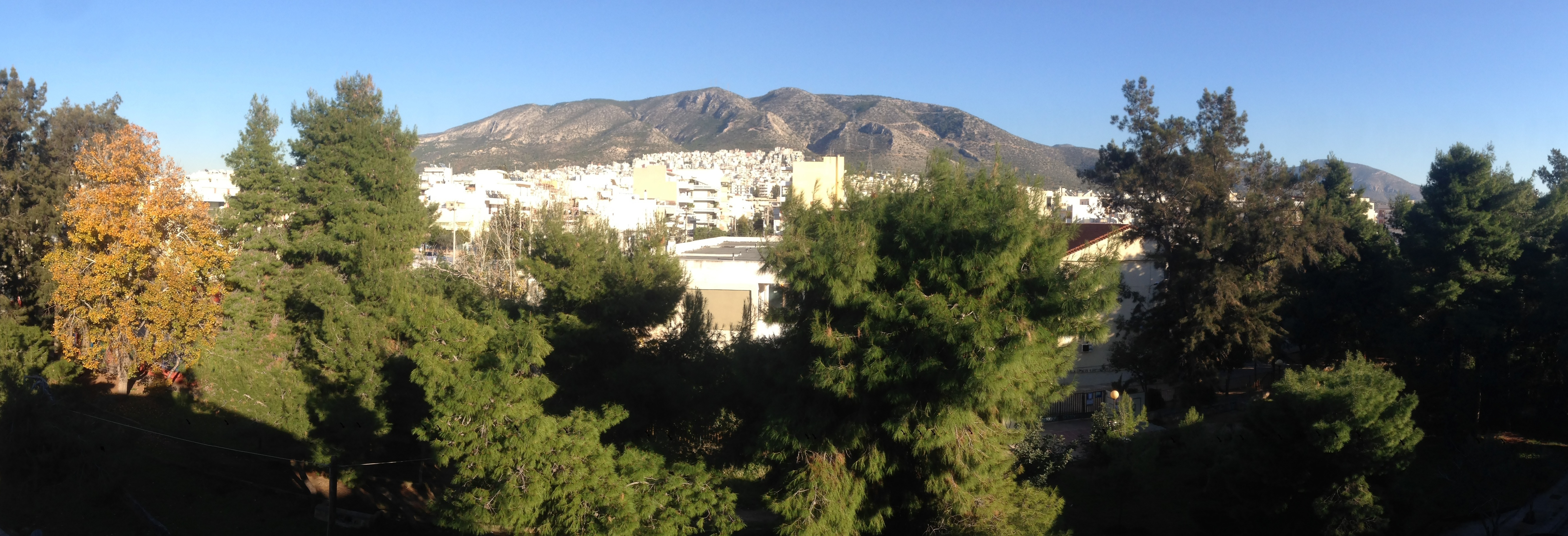
Mount Hymettus viewed from the Trachones Stream near the grounds of the 2nd Lyceum of Alimos in Euonymeia

== Civic life ==
Euonymeia is largely a residential area, with small shops and businesses along Ionias and Dodecanesou avenues. The central public space of the community stretches along the path of the Trachones stream, most of which now runs underground. This area features Karaiskakis square and park, which includes the "Klouva" outdoor public basketball court, and the municipal amphitheatre, where the major community events take place. Adjacent to the square is a large school complex with two public elementary schools, and the 2nd Lyceum of Alimos public high school. Next to the school complex is the Municipal Indoor Gymnasium of Trachones with a capacity for 350 seated spectators, the home court of the three local Basketball teams Trachones - Dias Union, A.L.F. Alimos, A.O. Kalamaki, and the Trachones Volleyball team. Along the same axis next to the Geroulanou Estate is Trachones Field (Greek: Γήπεδο Τραχώνων, Gipedo Trachonon), a 457-seat track and field stadium that is the seat of the local soccer team, FC Trachones.
