= Genetyllis =

Genetyllis may refer to:

- Genetyllis (Γενετυλλίς), an name applied to Aphrodite as protecting births and also to her companions (Γενετυλλίδες)
- Genetyllis (Γενετυλλίς), an epithet of Artemis as a guardian of childbirth
- Darwinia (plant)

== See also ==
- Genetyllides, minor Greek divinities protecting births
