= Strombichides =

Late 5th-century BC Athenian admiral and politician

Strombichides (Ancient Greek: Στρομβιχίδης) was an Athenian admiral and politician who lived during the late 5th century BC.

A son of Diotimus, Strombichides was appointed to command the eight ships which the Athenians sent to the coast of Asia Minor, following the news of the revolt of Chios in 412 BC. On his arrival at Samos he added a Samian trireme to his squadron and sailed to Teos to check on the rebellion there. But soon after, he was compelled to flee to Samos from a superior Peloponnesian fleet, under Chalcideus and Alcibiades and, as a result, Teos revolted.

Not long after this Strombichides seems to have returned to Athens, and later in the same year he was one of three commanders who were sent to the Athenians at Samos with a reinforcement of thirty-five ships, which increased their whole force to 104. This they now divided, retaining the greater part of the fleet at Samos to command the sea, and to carry on the war against Miletus, while Strombichides and two others were despatched to Chios with thirty triremes. On their way they lost three of their vessels in a storm. However, with the rest of the fleet they proceeded to Lesbos, and made preparations for the Siege of Chios, to which island they then crossed over, fortified a strong post named Delphinium, and reduced, for a time, the population of Chios to great extremities.

In 411 BC, following the revolt of Abydos and Lampsacus, Strombichides sailed from Chios with twenty four ships and recovered Lampsacus, but was unable either to persuade or compel Abydos to return to its allegiance. Accordingly he crossed over to Sestus, and there established a garrison to command the whole of the Hellespont. Soon after this, he was summoned to reinforce the Athenians at Samos, who were unable, before his arrival, to make headway against the superior force of the Peloponnesians under Astyochus.

Lysias regarded Strombichides as was one of the friends of democracy who expressed their indignation at the terms of the peace with which Theramenes and his fellow-ambassadors returned to Athens from Lacedaemon in 404 BC. Having thus made himself an enemy of the oligarchs, he was involved with the other prominent men of his party, in the accusation brought against them by Agoratus before the council, of a conspiracy to oppose the peace. They were all accordingly thrown into prison, and not long after were put to death following a mockery of a trial under the government of the Thirty.

Strombichides is believed to have been the father of the Athenian statesman, Autocles. With Strombichides' father, Diotimus, being head of the fleet as Nauarch, himself being a Taxiarch, and his son, Autocles rising to lead the army as Strategos, this family from the southern Deme of Euonymeia was one of the most influential of Athenian politics and military hierarchy.
