= Delphinium (Chios) =

Ancient site on Chios island, Greece

Coordinates: 38°29′19″N 26°07′55″E

Delphinium or Delphinion (Ancient Greek: Δελφίνιον) was a town of ancient Chios located on the east side of the island, in a strong position, with harbours, and not far from the city of Chios. In preparation for the Siege of Chios during the Peloponnesian War, the Athenian admiral, Strombichides, fortified Delphinium (412/1 BCE).

Its site is located near modern Delfini.
