= Euonymus (mythology) =

In Greek mythology, Euonymus (Ancient Greek: Εὐώνυμος, romanized: Euōnymos or Euṓnumos, lit. 'well-named', a euphemistic epithet) was the son of Gaia by Uranus or Cephissus. He was the eponym of the deme Euonymeia, Attica, whereas his daughter Aulis gave her name to the city Aulis, Boeotia.
