= Trachones Field =

Multi-purpose stadium in Trachones, Alimos, Athens

- Galaxias
- Interactive map of Trachones Field
- Location: Alimos, Athens, Greece
- Coordinates: 37°55′06.3″N 23°44′11.3″E
- Owner: Municipality of Alimos
- Capacity: 457
- Surface: Artificial turf

Construction
- Built: 1957
- Renovated: 2013

Tenant
- Alimos FC

Trachones Field (Greek: Γήπεδο Τραχώνων, Gipedo Trachonon), known locally as Galaxias (Greek: Γαλαξίας), is a 457-seat track and field stadium in Trachones, Alimos, Athens, Greece. It is the seat of the local soccer team A.O.T. Alimos F.C.
