= Kalamaki, Attica =

Kalamaki Καλαμάκι
- Neighborhood of Alimos, Greece
- Location within Greece
- Coordinates: 37°54′39″N 23°42′41″E

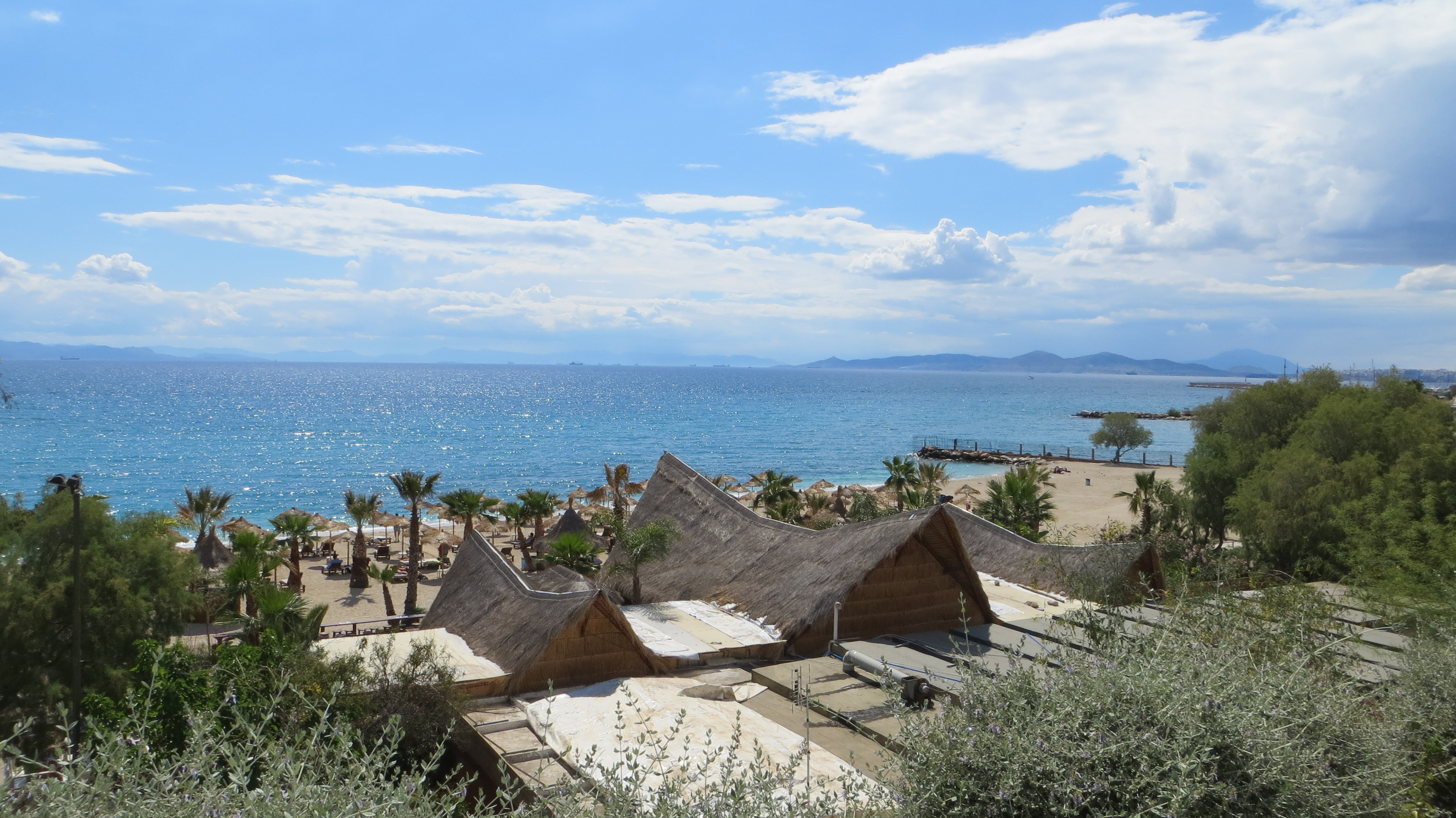
One of the beaches located in Kalamaki (Alimos).

Kalamaki (Greek: Καλαμάκι) was a seaside settlement, and current residential and commercial neighborhood within Alimos, a suburban town and a municipality in the South Athens regional unit within the Athens urban agglomeration. The coastal village of Kalamaki was founded in 1923 as a result of the population exchange between Greece and Turkey by resettled ethnic Greeks from the Anatolian village of Kalamaki, which was renamed to Kalkan. Between 1942 and 1945, Kalamaki joined the neighboring coastal settlement of Phalerum, to form the municipality of Palaio Faliro. In 1968, the settlement was administratively merged with the inland community of Trachones to the east, together forming the contemporary municipality of Alimos. The area of Kalamaki corresponds to the location of Alimos, an ancient deme of the Athenian democracy in classical antiquity.

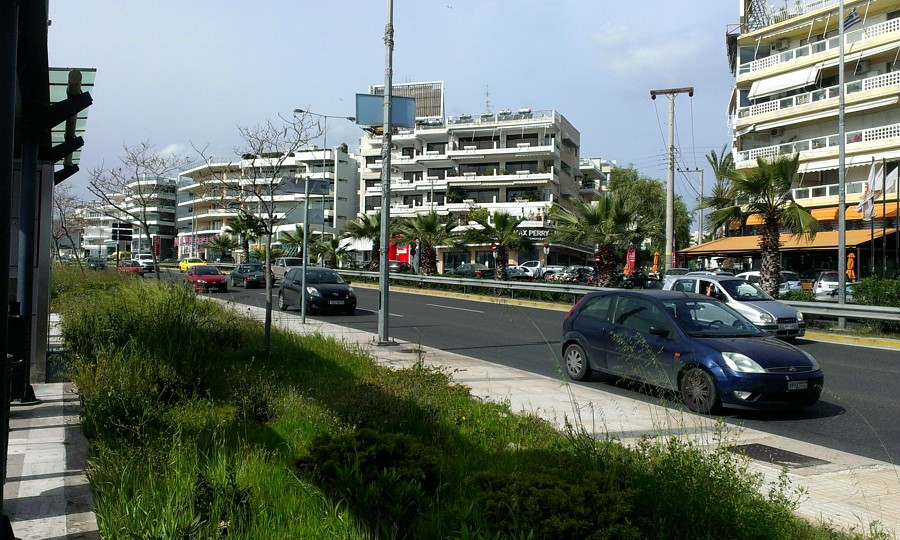
The coastal Poseidonos Avenue in Kalamaki (Alimos)

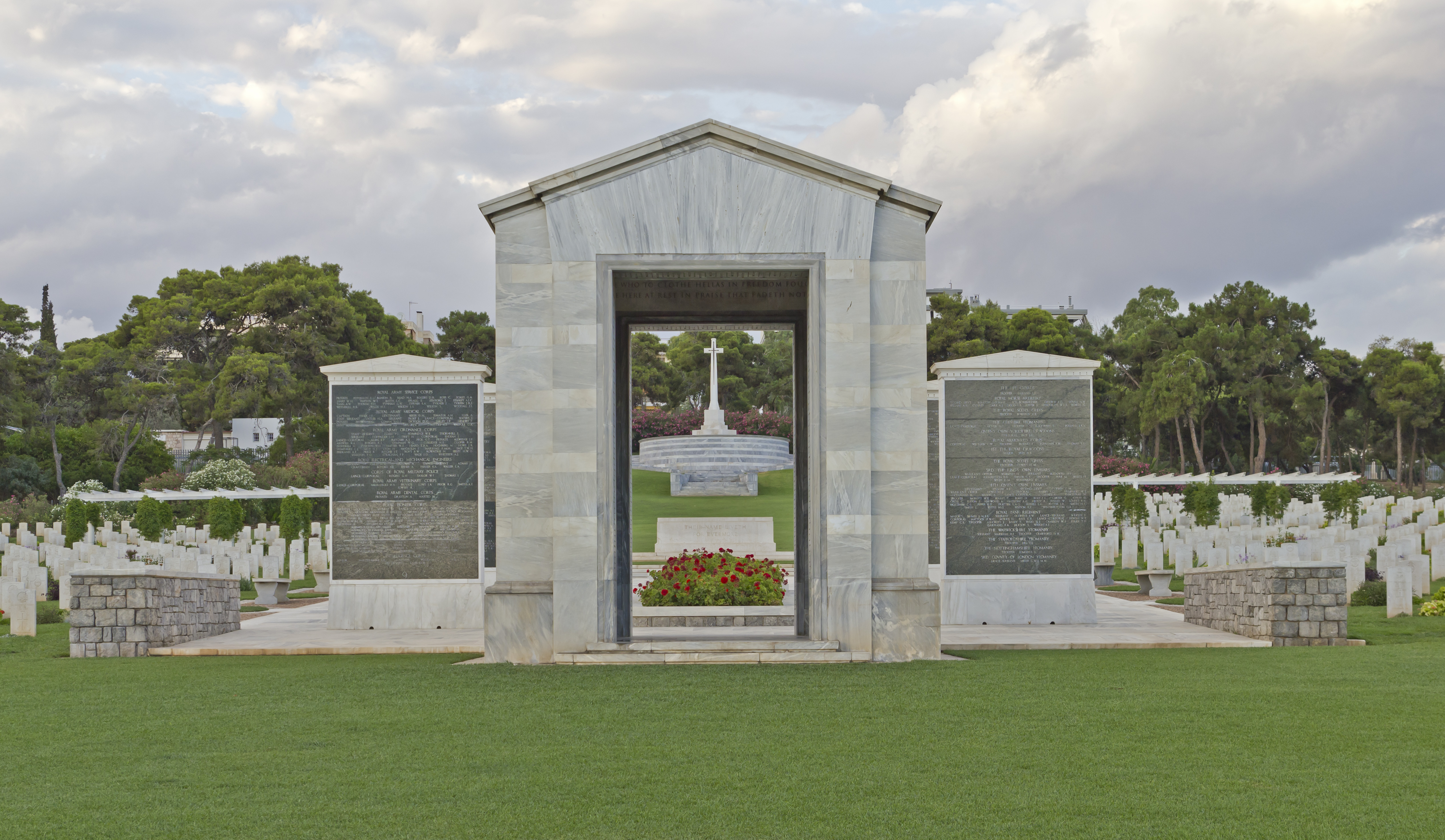
The Faliron British War Cemetery, located within Kalamaki.
