= A.O.T. Alimos F.C. =

Greek football club

A.O.T. Alimos
- Full name: Athlitikos Omilos Trachones Alimos
- Founded: 1957; 69 years ago
- Ground: Trachones Field
- Capacity: 457
- Chairman: Christos Tsiouris
- Manager: Tasos Tasiopoulos
- League: Athens FCA First Division
- 2025–26: Athens FCA First Division (Group 2), 3rd
- Website: http://trahonesalimoufc.gr/
Home colours	Away colours

A.O.T. Alimos F.C. (Greek: Α.Ο.Τ. Αλίμου) is a Greek football club, based in, Alimos, Athens.

The club was founded in 1957 as A.O Trachones F.C. The name of the team was changed to the current name in the summer of 2014 after the team was promoted to play in the Football League for the season 2014–15.

== Honours ==
=== Domestic ===
- Football League 2
  - Winners (1): 2013–14
