= Genetyllides =

In Greek mythology, the Genetyllides (Ancient Greek: Γενετυλλίδες) were minor goddesses or spirits connected with the childbirth ("of one's birth hour") and procreation with a sanctuary on Cape Colias. Often depicted as attendants of Aphrodite, the goddess of love and beauty, the Genetyllides held a significant, albeit specialized, role in the religious beliefs of ancient Greece. The Genetyllides were mostly venerated by women, with men regarding the cult as suspicious ("foreign religion" according to Aristophanes in The Clouds, possibly indicating influence of Astarte). These spirits were symbolizing female sensuality and associated with gluttony, deep kisses, erotic music.

Similar to Eileithyia, Genetyllides received canine sacrifices for easy delivery of a baby, an unusual choice of sacrificial animal in ancient Greece. In a singular form, Genetyllis (Ancient Greek: Γενετυλλίς) became one of the names of Aphrodite and, sometimes, associated with Hekate or Artemis.

Pausanias (1.1.5) mentions Genetyllides alongside Gennaides (Hadzisteliou-Price suggests other kourotrophoi, Genethliai), different forms of the same group of nymphs associated with birth and offsprings.

Small female figures next to Aphrodite on coins and in visual arts are sometimes interpreted as Genetyllides.

== Sources ==
- Frazer, J.G. (1898). "Cape Colias". Pausanias's Description of Greece: Commentary on Book 1. Pausanias's Description of Greece. Macmillan and Company, Limited. pp. 35–36.
- Graf, Fritz (2002-01-01). "What is New About Greek Sacrifice?". Kykeon. Brill. pp. 113–125. doi:10.1163/9789004295940_006. ISBN 978-90-04-29594-0.
- Graf, Fritz (2006). "Genetyllis". Brill's New Pauly Online. Brill. doi:10.1163/1574-9347_bnp_e421540.
- Hadzisteliou-Price, Theodora (1978). Kourotrophos: Cults and Representations of the Greek Nursing Deities. Brill Archive. ISBN 978-90-04-05251-2.
- Parker, Robert (2005-11-25). Polytheism and Society at Athens. OUP Oxford. ISBN 978-0-19-153452-2.
- Leonhard Schmitz (1870). "Genetyllis". In Smith, William (ed.). Dictionary of Greek and Roman Biography and Mythology.
