= Cape Colias =

Ancient promontory in Attica, Greece

- Κωλιὰς ἄκρα (Ancient Greek)
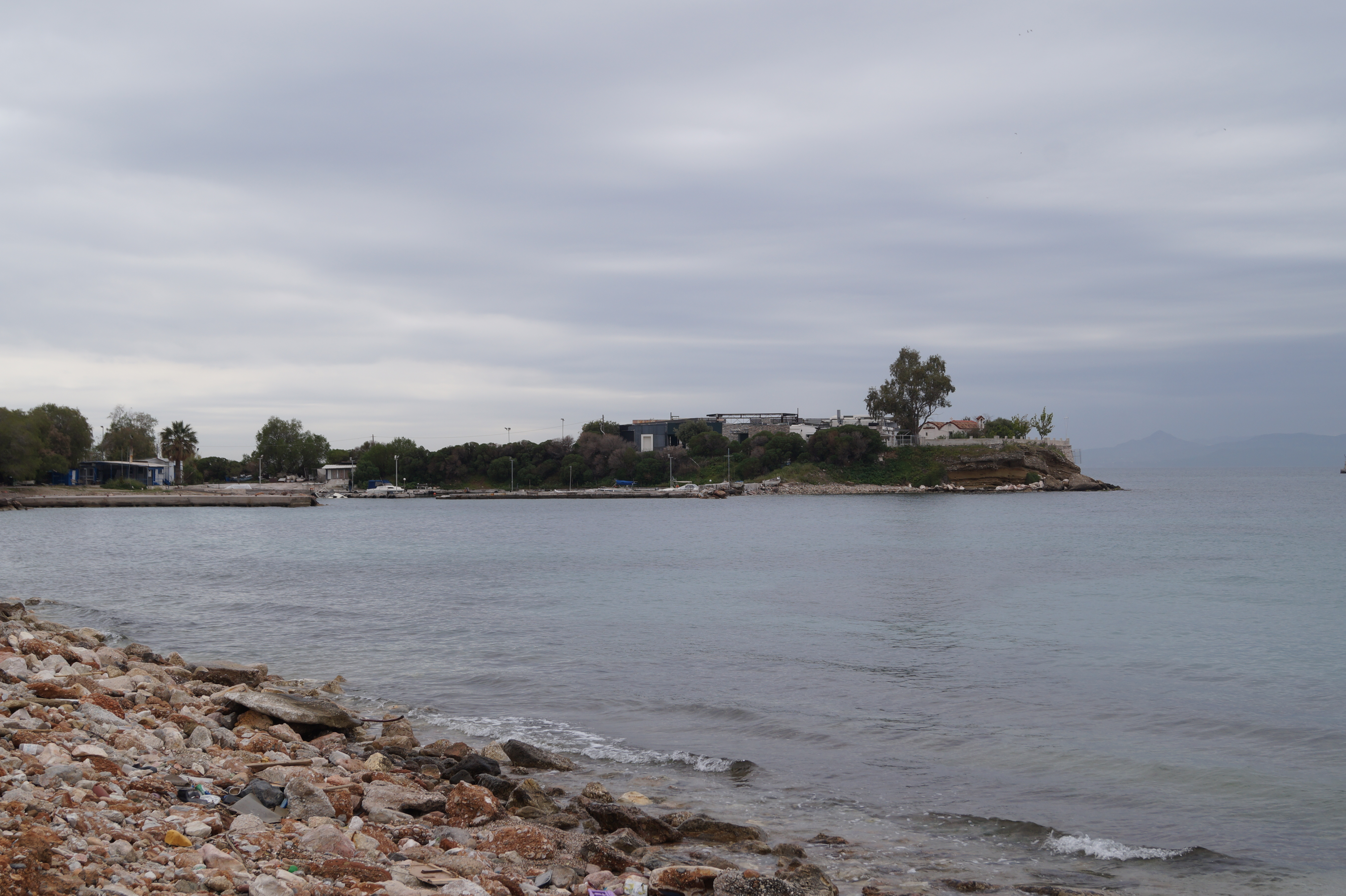
- Promontory of Agios Kosmas
- Interactive map of Cape Colias
- 37.8946281°N 23.715298°E
- Type: Promontory
- Periods: Archaic to Roman
- Cultures: Greek
- Location: near Athens, Greece
- Region: Attica
- Part of: Saronic Gulf coast
- Associated with cults of Aphrodite and the Genetyllides; site where wreckage from the Battle of Salamis washed ashore.

Cape Colias (Ancient Greek: Κωλιὰς ἄκρα, Kōliàs ákra) was a promontory on the coast of Attica in ancient Greece, located about 20 stadia from Phaleron. The cape is most commonly identified with the modern promontory of Agios Kosmas.

The site was historically significant as the location where the wreckage of the Persian fleet washed ashore after the Battle of Salamis, and it was home to a notable sanctuary of Coliad Aphrodite and Genetyllides.

The location was also known for high-quality clay used for pottery.

== Mythology and Religion ==
Cape Colias was the site of a temple dedicated to Aphrodite Colias. Associated with her were the Genetyllides, minor goddesses or spirits of childbirth and procreation who were considered attendants of Aphrodite. Pausanias suggested that these deities were the same as the Gennaïdes worshipped by the Phocaeans in Ionia.

The cult was particularly important to women. The playwright Aristophanes mentions the cult in The Clouds, where it is humorously referred to as a "foreign" religion, possibly hinting at an Eastern influence, such as the cult of Astarte.

== History ==
=== Battle of Salamis ===
According to the historian Herodotus, the wrecks of the Persian ships from their defeat at the Battle of Salamis (480 BC) were carried by the current and washed up on the shores of Cape Colias. This event was seen by the Athenians as a fulfillment of an oracle by a certain Lysistratus, which had predicted that "the Colian women shall cook their food with oars."

=== Solon and the Megarians ===
Plutarch, in his Life of Solon, recounts a stratagem employed by the Athenian statesman Solon to defeat the Megarians. Having learned that Megarian ships were sailing to Colias to capture Athenian women during a festival, Solon had a group of beardless young men dress in the women's clothes. They danced on the shore, luring the Megarians to disembark, at which point the disguised Athenians slaughtered them.

== Ancient Descriptions ==
Pausanias, in his Description of Greece (2nd century AD), describes the cape:

Twenty stades away is the promontory called Colias; on to it, when the Persian fleet was destroyed, the wrecks were carried down by the waves. There is here an image of the Coliad Aphrodite, with the goddesses Genetyllides, as they are called. And I am of opinion that the goddesses of the Phocaeans in Ionia, whom they call Gennaides, are the same as those at Colias.

Strabo also mentions the promontory in his Geographica, erroneously locating it near the deme of Anaphlystus.

== Modern Identification ==
The ancient promontory of Colias is identified with the modern cape of Agios Kosmas (Cape Cosmas) located near Elliniko in the southern suburbs of Athens since at least the late 19th century (P. Kastriotes). Archaeological excavations at Agios Kosmas have revealed remains from the Early Bronze Age, though prominent remains of the temple of Aphrodite have not been definitively identified, it is suggested that the sanctuary stood where the church of Saint Cosmas is standing. The location fits the geographical descriptions provided by ancient authors in relation to Phaleron and the surrounding coastline.

== Sources ==
- "Miscellaneous". The Journal of the Archaeological Institute of America. II. Macmillan Company: 313. 1898.
- Day, John (1932). "Cape Colias Phalerum and the Phaleric Wall". American Journal of Archaeology. 36 (1). Archaeological Institute of America: 1–11. ISSN 0002-9114. JSTOR 498263.
- Hadzisteliou-Price, Theodora (1978). Kourotrophos: Cults and Representations of the Greek Nursing Deities. Brill Archive. ISBN 978-90-04-05251-2.
- Lohmann, Hans (2006). "Kolias akra". Brill's New Pauly Online. Brill. doi:10.1163/1574-9347_bnp_e618200.
- Mylonas, George Emmanuel (1959). Aghios Kosmas: An Early Bronze Age Settlement and Cemetery in Attica. Princeton University Press. ISBN 978-0-598-84006-6.
  - Mylonas, George Emmanuel (1934). "Excavations at Haghios kosmas". American Journal of Archaeology. Preliminary Report. 38 (2). Archaeological Institute of America: 258–279. ISSN 0002-9114. JSTOR 498080.
