= Autocles =

4th-century BC Athenian politician

Autocles (Ancient Greek: Aὐτοκλῆς; lived 4th century BC) of Euonymeia, son of Strombichides, was one of the Athenian envoys empowered to negotiate peace with Sparta in 371 BC. Xenophon reports a somewhat injudicious speech of his, which was delivered on this occasion before the congress at Sparta, and which by no means confirms the character, ascribed to him in the same passage, of a skilful orator. It was perhaps this same Autocles who, in 362, was appointed to the command in Thrace, and was brought to trial for having caused, by his inactivity there, the triumph of Cotys over the rebel Miltocythes. Aristotle refers to a passage in a speech of Autocles against Mixidemides, as illustrating one of his rhetorical topoi.
