= John Thomson (cartographer) =

Scottish cartographer

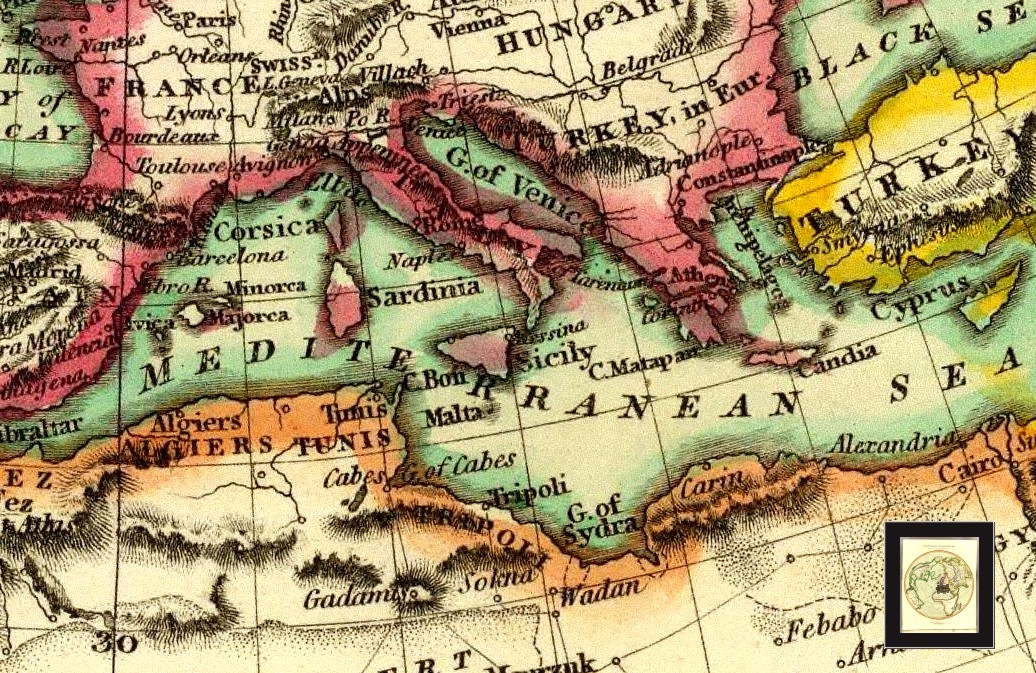
Detail from New General Atlas

John Thomson (c. 1777 – c. 1840) was a Scottish cartographer from Edinburgh, celebrated for his 1817 New General Atlas, published by himself in Edinburgh, John Cumming in Dublin, and Baldwin, Cradock, and Joy in London.

The title page described it as

"A new general atlas, consisting of a series of geographical designs, on various projections, exhibiting the form and component parts of the globe; and a collection of maps and charts, delineating the natural and political divisions of the empires, kingdoms, and states in the World. Constructed from the best systematic works, and the most authentic voyages and travels. With a memoir of the progress of geography, a summary of physical geography, and a consulting index to facilitate the finding out of places. Edinburgh: Printed by George Ramsay and Company, for John Thomson and Company, Edinburgh; Baldwin, Cradock, and Joy, London; and John Cumming, Dublin. 1817."

== Publications ==
- The Cabinet Atlas
- The Classical and Historical Atlas
- The New General Atlas, 1817
- The Traveller's Guide through Scotland and its Islands, 1829
- The Edinburgh School Classical Atlas, 1831
- Atlas of Scotland, 1832

== Map Gallery ==
Sample of maps found in Wikimedia Commons:

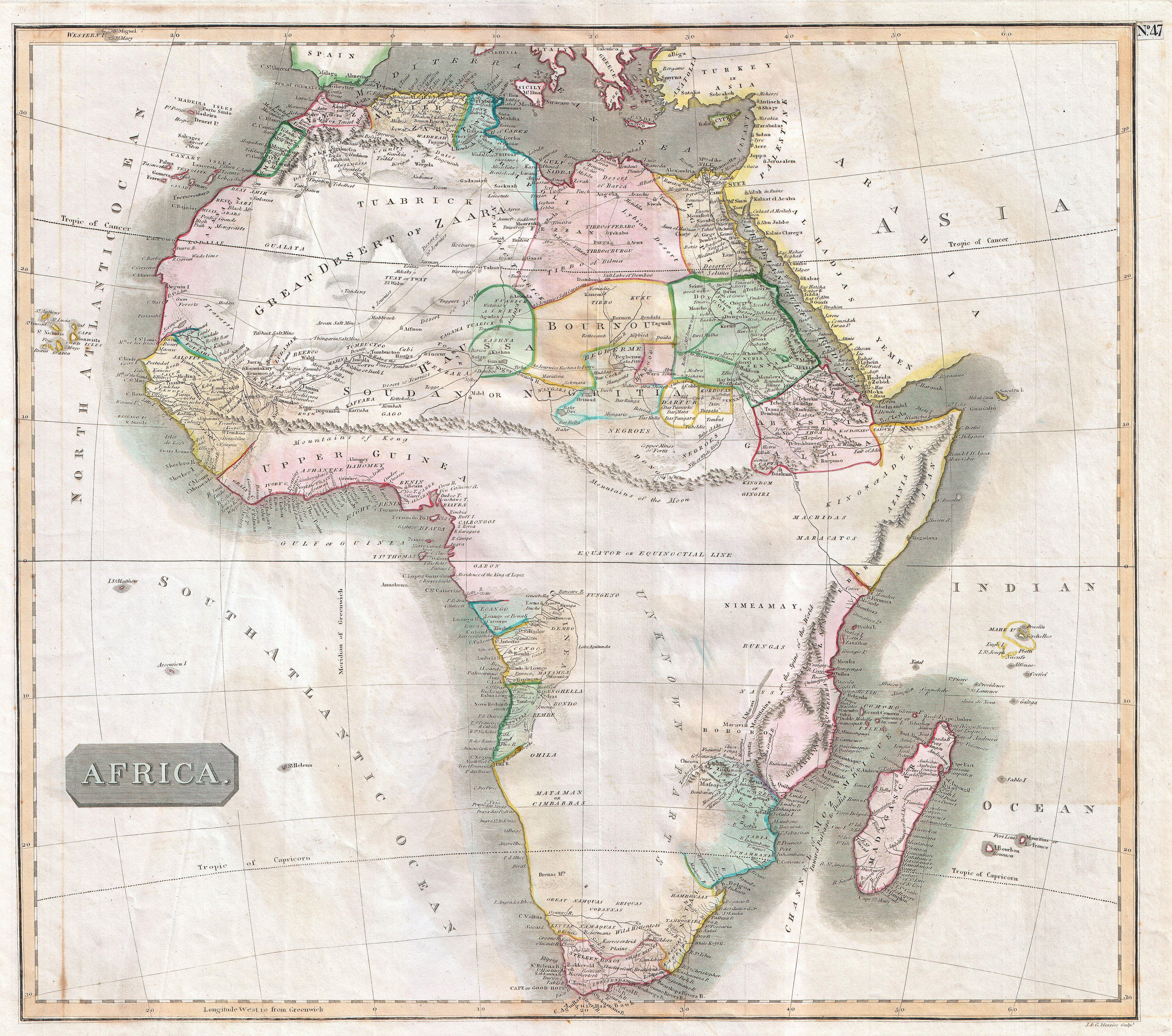
Africa, 1813.

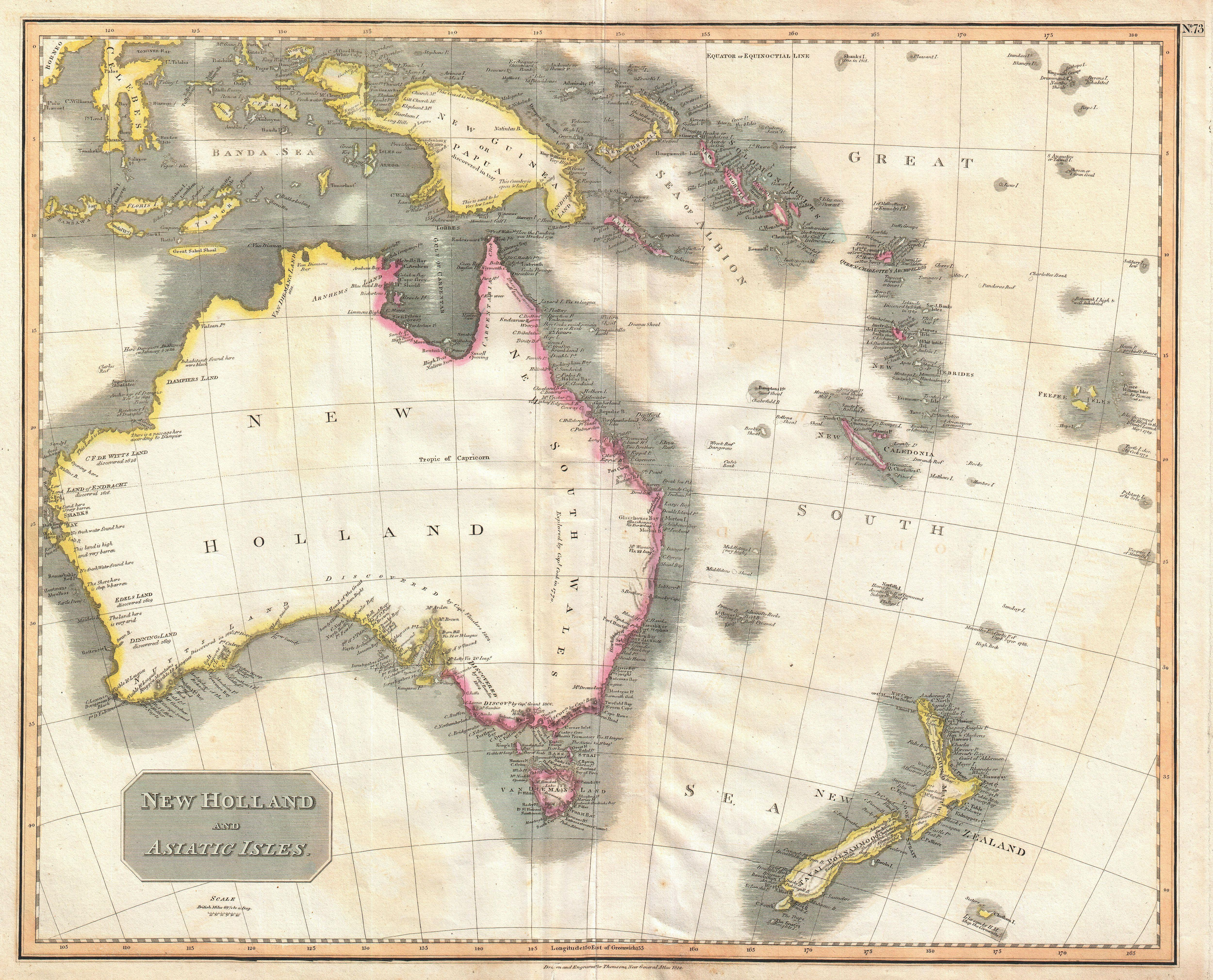
Australia, New Zealand and New Guinea, 1814.

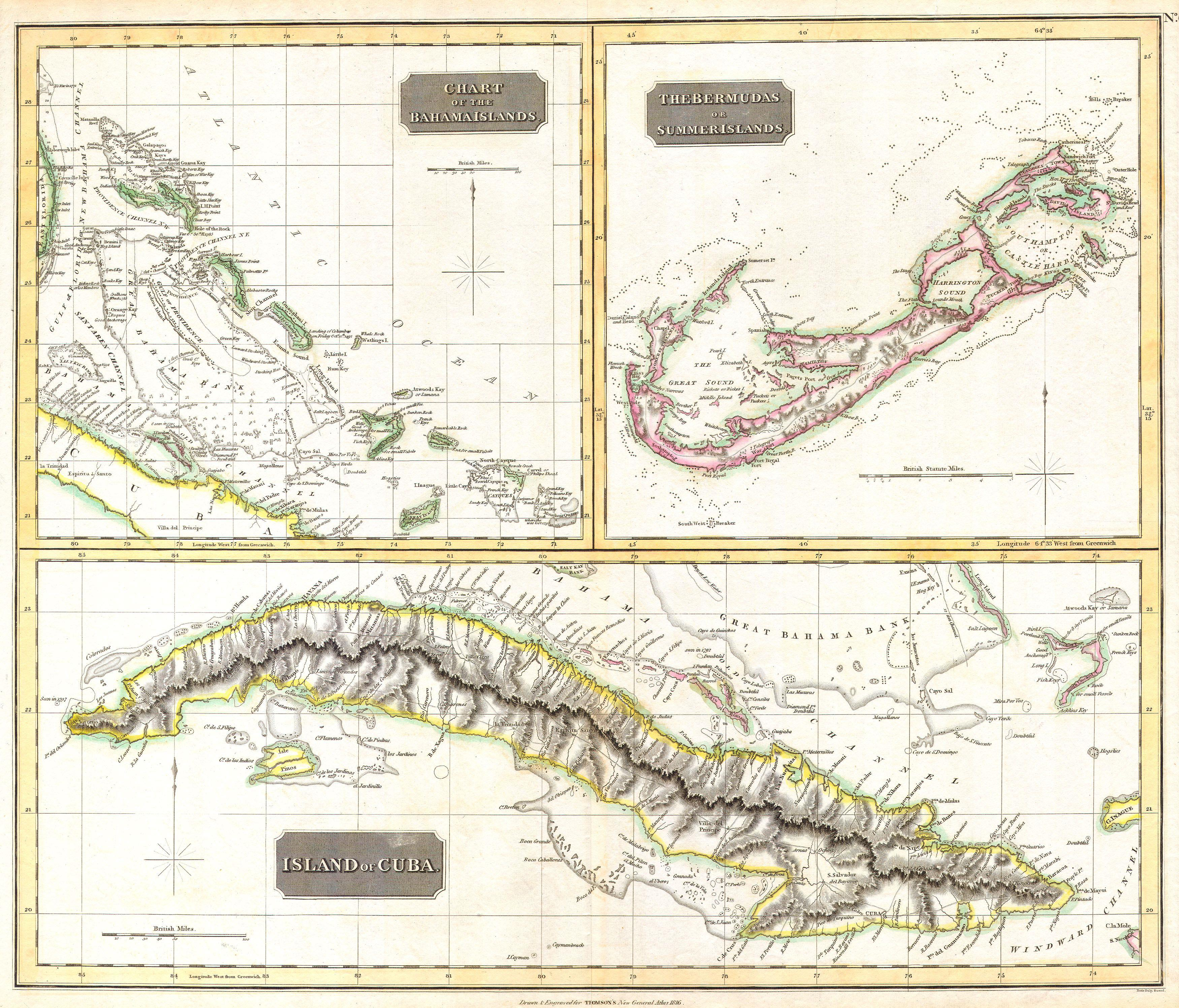
Bahamas, Bermuda, Cuba, 1815.

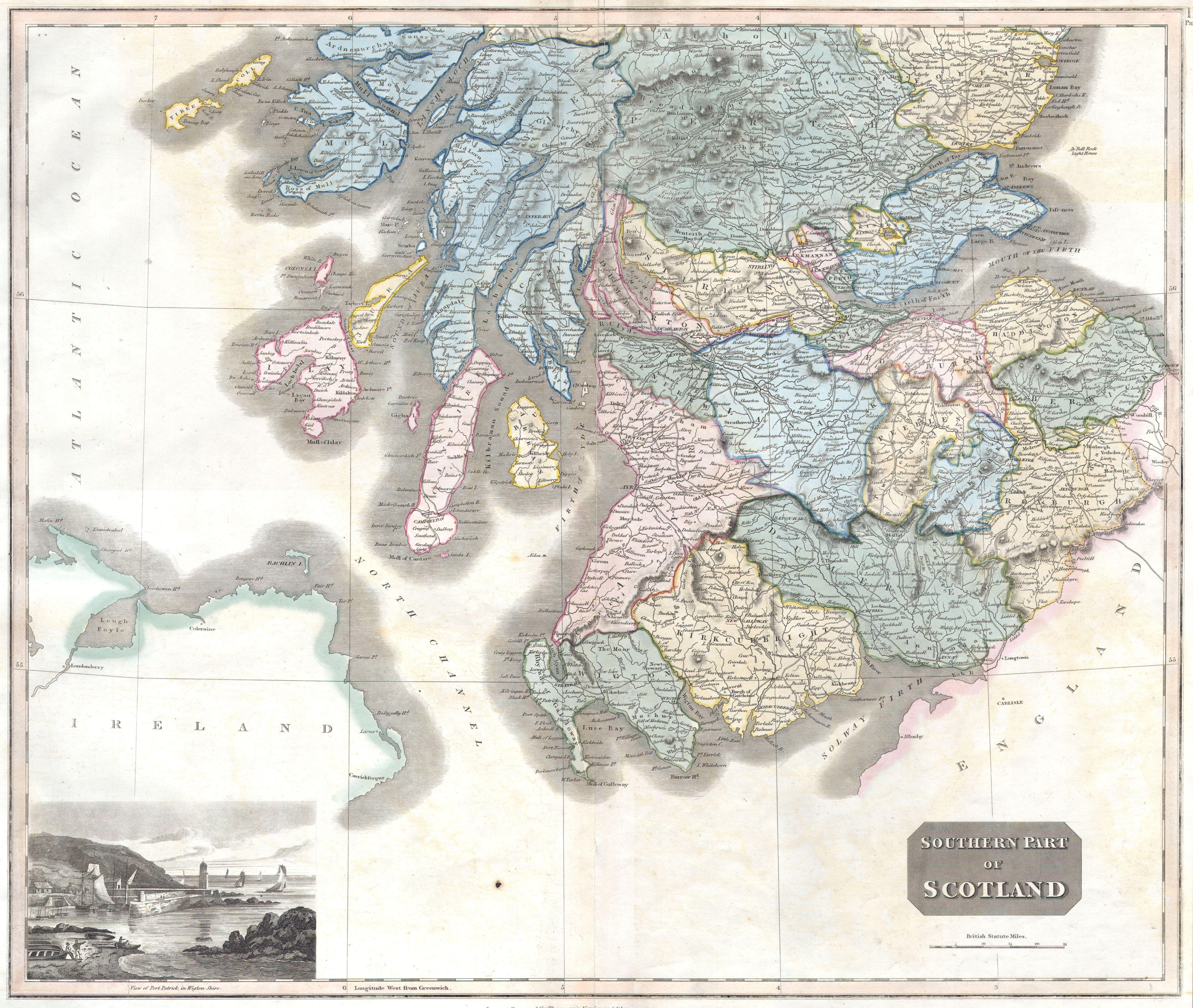
Southern Scotland, 1815.

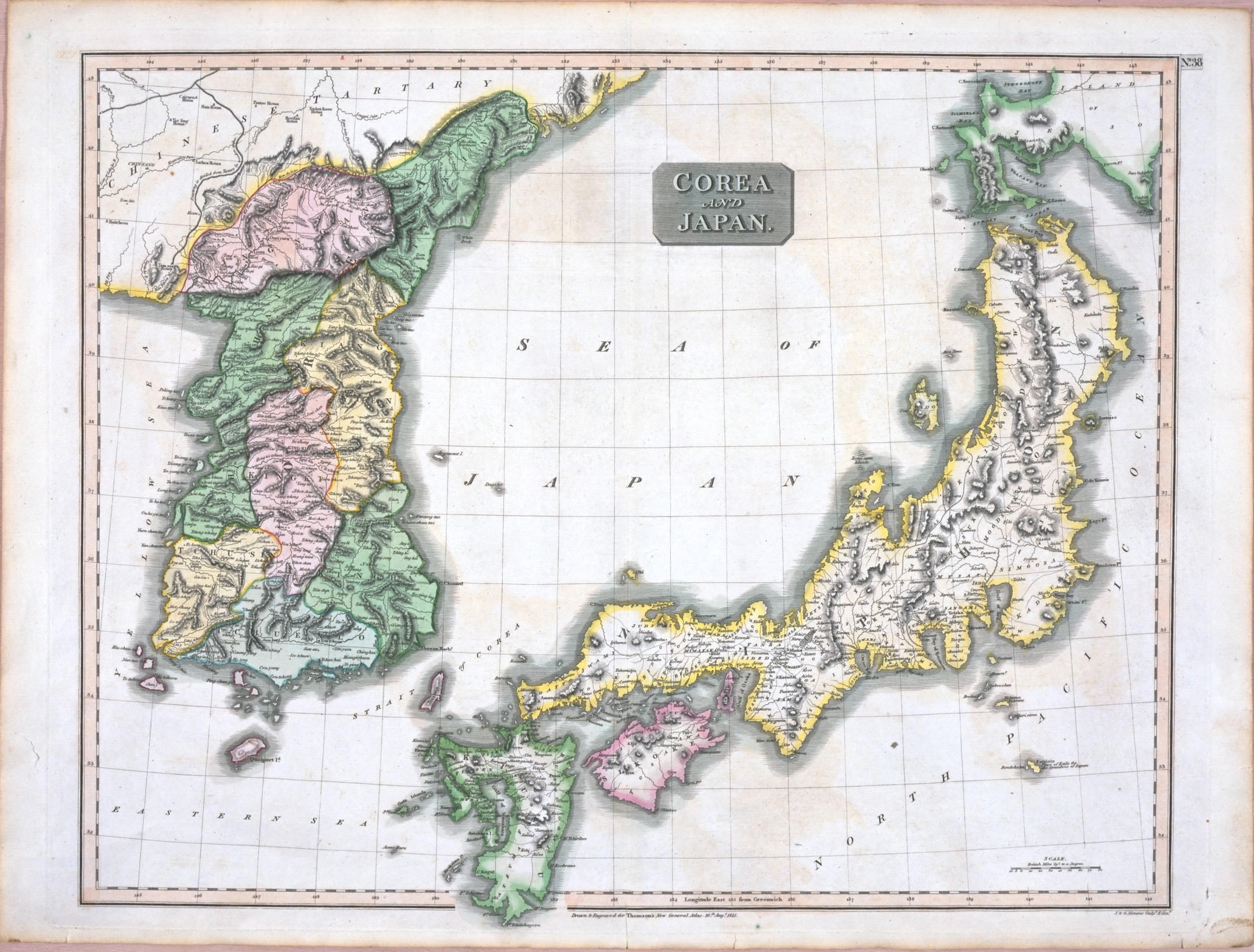
Corea and Japan, 1815
