= Ziller (surname) =

Ziller is a German surname, a bargeman. Notable people with the surname include:

- Ernst Ziller (1837–1923), Saxon architect
- Eugene Ziller, American author
- Gerhart Ziller (1912-1957), German politician
- Hans Ziller (born 1958), German musician
- Iosifina Dimas-Ziller (1885-1965), Greek painter
- Stefan Ziller (born 1984), German politician

== See also ==
- Miller (surname)
- Zillmer
- Zillner
