= Cathedra =

Bishop's throne in a cathedral

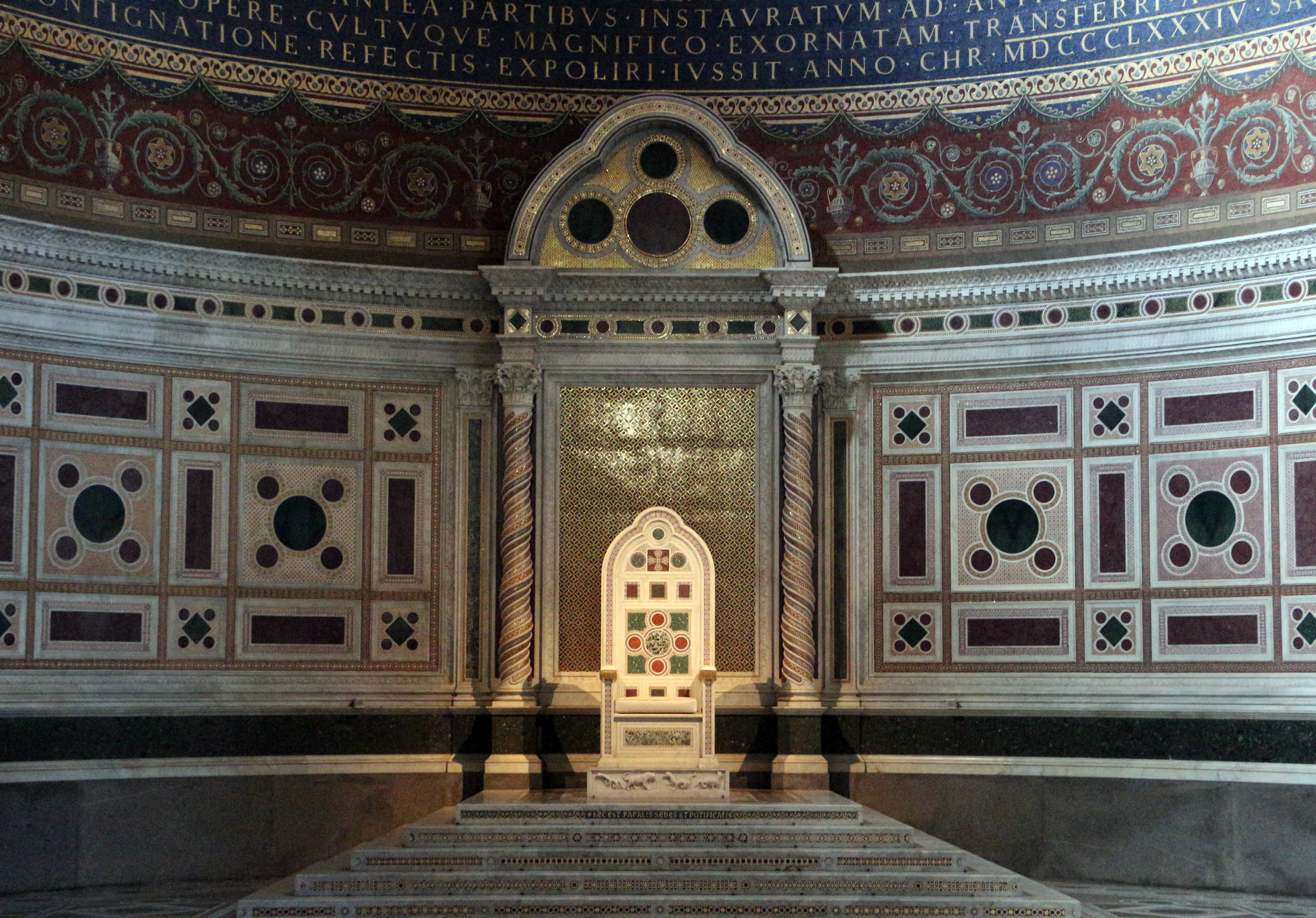
The cathedra of the pope in the apse of St. John Lateran, the cathedral church of Rome

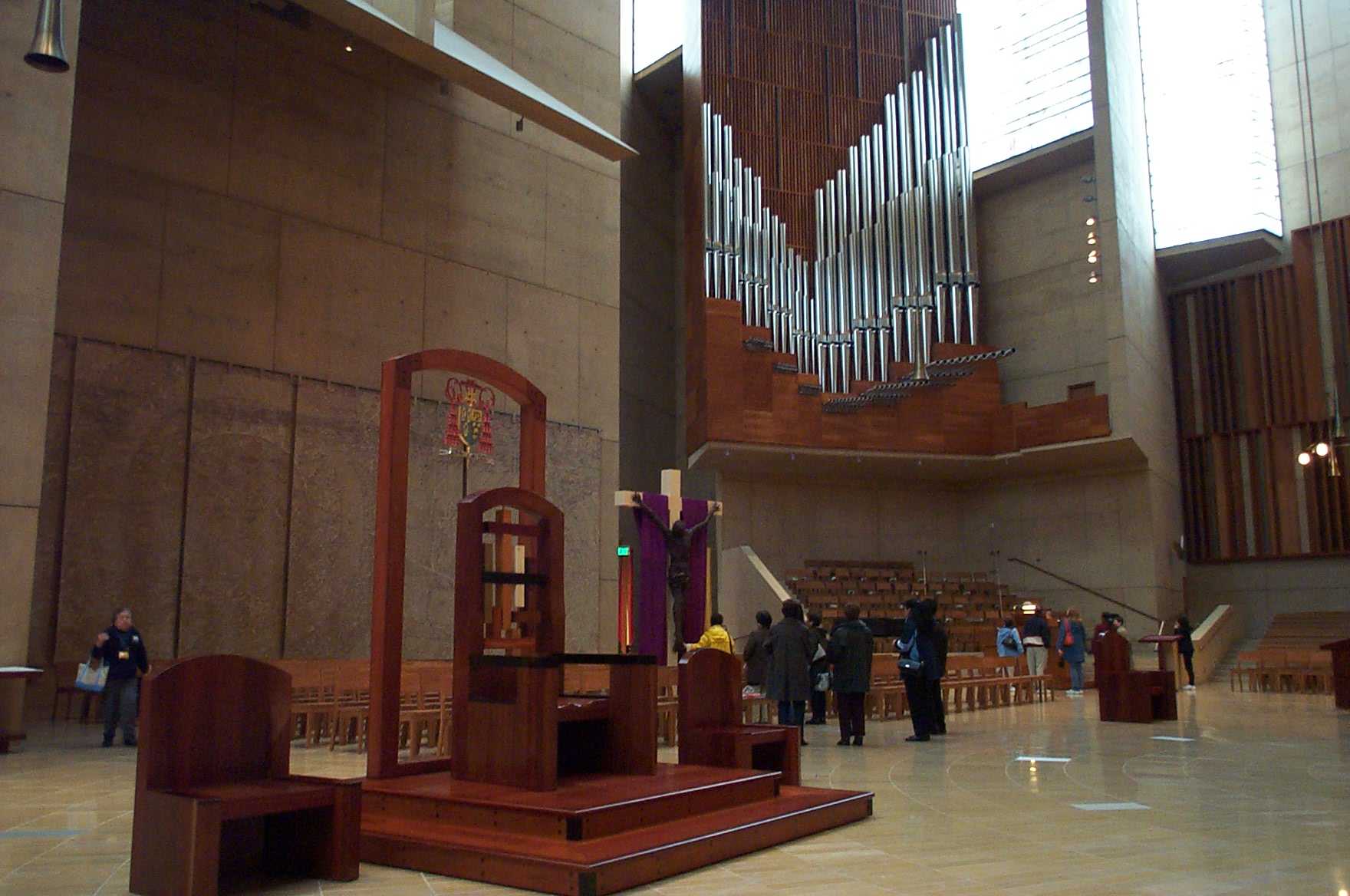
Modern cathedra at the Cathedral of Our Lady of the Angels in Los Angeles

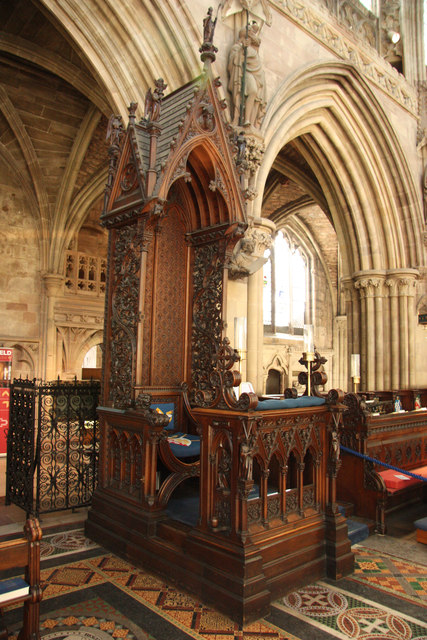
19th-century cathedra in Lichfield Cathedral

A cathedra is the throne of a bishop, found in the cathedral church of their diocese. The word derives from the Greek καθέδρα (kathédra), meaning "seat", especially one used by a bishop or teacher; this term is also the ultimate source of the word "chair".

== Cathedrae apostolorum ==
The term appears in early Christian literature in the phrase cathedrae apostolorum, indicating authority derived directly from the apostles.

== Ex cathedra ==
The doctrine of papal infallibility, the Latin phrase ex cathedra (literally, "from the chair") was proclaimed at the First Vatican Council by Pius IX in 1870 as meaning "when, in the exercise of his office as shepherd and teacher of all Christians, in virtue of his supreme apostolic authority, the Bishop of Rome defines a doctrine concerning faith or morals to be held by the whole Church."

== Cathedra as bishop's see ==
Tertullian (c. 155 – c. 240?) was the first to use cathedra in the meaning of a bishop's see.

== Cathedrals as a bishop's seat ==
Eventually, the main church of a diocese, used as the primary church by its bishop, received the title "cathedral". The cathedral is literally the church into which a bishop's official cathedra is installed.

The Joint International Commission for Theological Dialogue Between the Catholic Church and the Orthodox Church makes use of the term cathedral to point out the existence of a bishop in each local church, in the heart of ecclesial apostolicity.

== Notable examples ==
=== Cathedra Petri ===
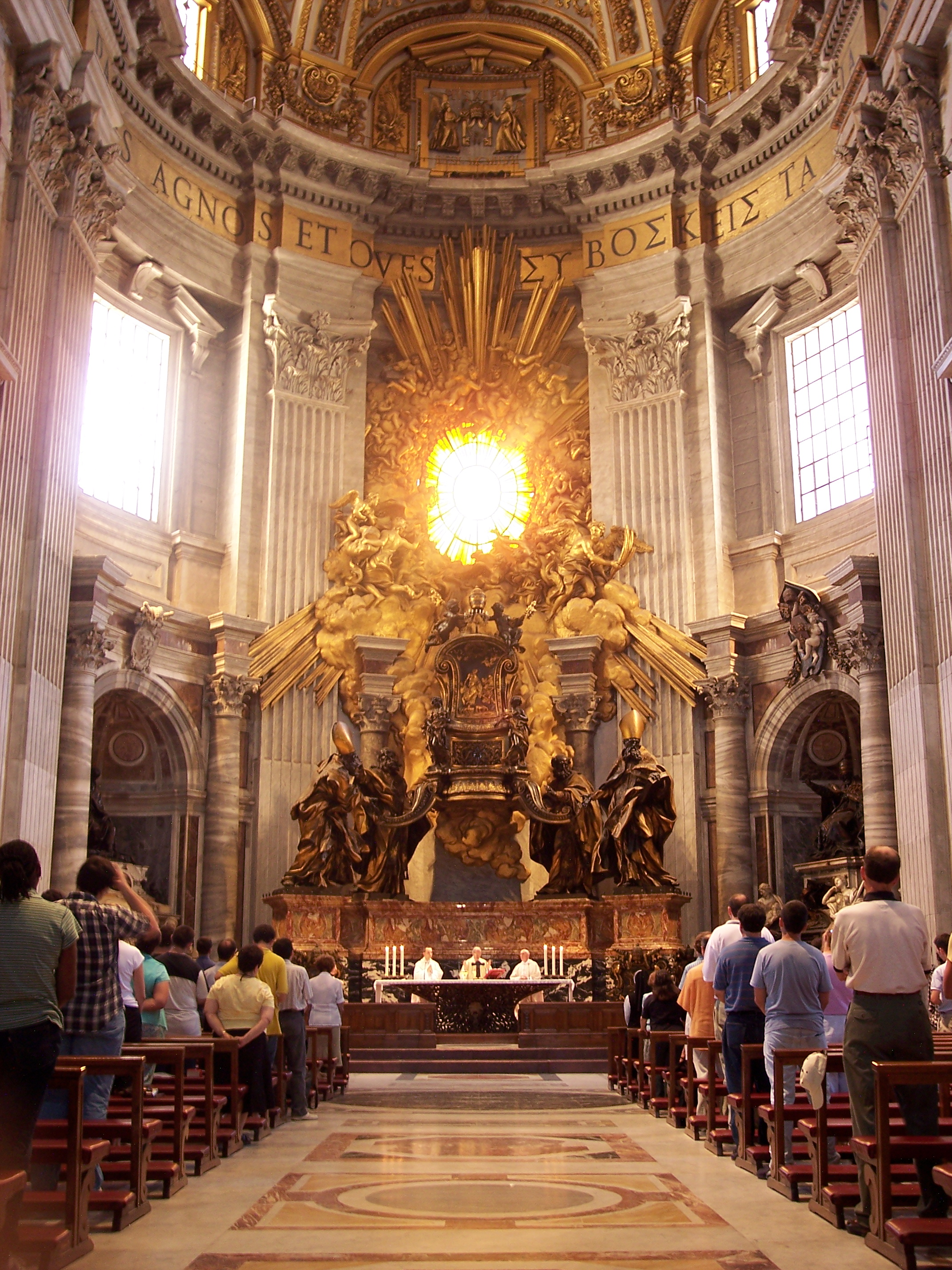
Bernini's massive sculptural reliquary for the Cathedra Petri or "Chair of Peter" in St. Peter's Basilica, Rome

The definitive example of a cathedra is that encased within the Triumph of the cathedra Petri designed by Gian Lorenzo Bernini in 1657, and completed and installed in St Peter's Rome in 1666. As early as the 8th century, an ancient wooden chair overlaid with ivory plaques depicting The Twelve Labours of Heracles and some of the constellations, was venerated as the episcopal chair of St. Peter. It is a Byzantine throne with framed fragments of acacia wood, encased in the oak carcass and reinforced with iron bands. It was long believed to have been used by the Apostle Saint Peter, but the Holy See recognises that the chair was a gift from Holy Roman Emperor Charles the Bald to Pope John VIII in 875. Several rings facilitated its transportation during processions. Pope Alexander VII commissioned Bernini to build a monument to display this relic in a triumphant manner. Bernini's gilded bronze throne, richly ornamented with bas-reliefs, encloses the relic. On January 17, 1666, it was solemnly set above the altar of Saint Peter's Basilica in Vatican City. Greater than life-sized sculptures of four Doctors of the Church form an honour guard: St. Ambrose and St. Athanasius on the left, and St. John Chrysostom and St. Augustine on the right.

Celebrated on February 22 in accordance with the calendar of saints, the Feast of Cathedra Petri (the Feast of the Chair of Peter the Apostle) honours the founding of the church in Rome and gives thanks for the work of Saint Peter.

=== Chair of Bishop Maximianus ===
A fifth- or sixth-century bishop's throne decorated with elaborate ivory carving is preserved in the sacristy of the cathedral at Ravenna. It bears a monogram in front, "Maximianus ep.", which gave it its name. The identity of the bishop is given by the 1908 Catholic Encyclopedia as Maximianus of Constantinople (d. 431), considered as more likely than Maximianus of Ravenna (d. 556).

=== Chair of St. Augustine ===
The Chair of St. Augustine represents one of the most ancient extant cathedrae in use. Named after the first Archbishop of Canterbury, St. Augustine of Canterbury, it is made of Purbeck Marble or Bethesda marble and dates to sometime between the 6th and 12th centuries. Those who argue for an older date suggest that it may have been used to crown the kings of Kent. Canterbury Cathedral, in which the cathedra is housed, maintains that the chair was once part of the furnishings of the shrine of St. Thomas Becket, since dismantled. Since the Middle Ages, it has always been used in the triple enthronement of an Archbishop of Canterbury. He is seated on the throne in the quire as Diocesan Bishop, in the chapter house as titular abbot, and in St. Augustine's chair as Primate of All England. This is the only occasion in which the cathedra is used. A second cathedra is used for other occasions at which the archbishop is present.

== Placement ==
The early Christian bishop's throne, or cathedra, stood in an elevated position behind the altar, near the wall of the apse. It had been the position of the magistrate in the apse of the Roman basilica, which provided the model type—and sometimes were adapted as the structures—for early Christian basilicas.

=== Western churches ===
In the Middle Ages, as altars came to be placed against the wall of the apse, the practice of placing the cathedra to one side (mostly left) became standard.

In the Roman Catholic Church since the Second Vatican Council, the altar is often free-standing. The cathedra in cathedrals built or renovated after Vatican II is sometimes placed behind the altar, as in ancient Roman basilicas.

In Anglican practice, the cathedra tends to be placed to one side in the choir, although in more contemporary practice, it is commonly placed on the gospel side of the chancel (i.e., to the left of the altar, as one looks at it from the front).

=== Eastern churches ===
Eastern Orthodox and Byzantine Rite Catholic churches have a throne for the bishop in the apse behind the holy table, with seats for the priests (Greek: synthranon) arranged to either side. This location is referred to as the "high place" and represents the presence of Christ presiding over the services, even when the bishop is not present and therefore an icon of Christ is often placed above the bishop's throne. The bishop ascends to the high place only during the divine liturgy, at the Trisagion. For this reason, the consecration of a bishop takes place at the Trisagion, so that he may ascend to the high place for the first time as a bishop during the liturgy at which he is consecrated.

Another throne is provided for the bishop in the nave of the church:

- In the Greek Orthodox Church practice, this is normally located along the southern wall of the church, on the kliros. In this style, it is one of the monastic choir stalls (kathismata), only more elaborately carved, usually at the top of three steps, and with a canopy above it. During the divine liturgy, the deacon ascends to this throne to read the gospel, facing west.
- In the Russian Orthodox Church practice, the kafedra (Russian: кафедра, káfedra) is a large square platform set in the very center of the nave, with a removable chair or faldstool placed on it. This arrangement is a remnant of the ancient bemah (Greek: amvon), borrowed from the Jewish synagogue, which stood in the center of the church in ancient times. Sometimes during the liturgy, the deacon stands on this platform, facing east, to read the gospel.

An orlets is usually placed at both the high place and the throne in the nave. An orlets is usually kept permanently on the Russian kafedra, even when the chair is removed; the orlets is, however, removed when a deacon stands on the kafedra to read the gospel.

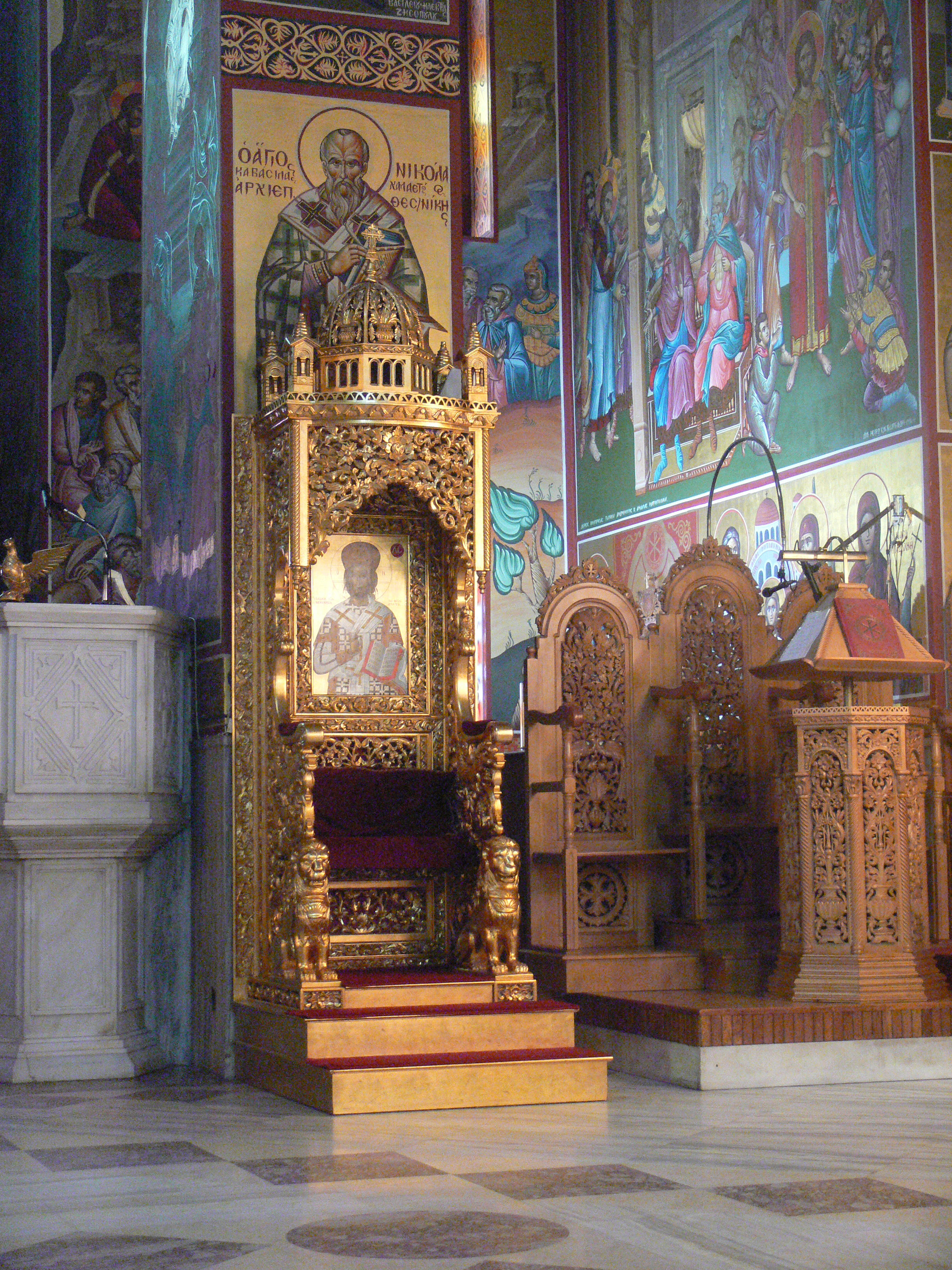
The metropolitan bishop's cathedra in the Church of St. Gregory Palamas, Thessaloniki, following the Eastern practice

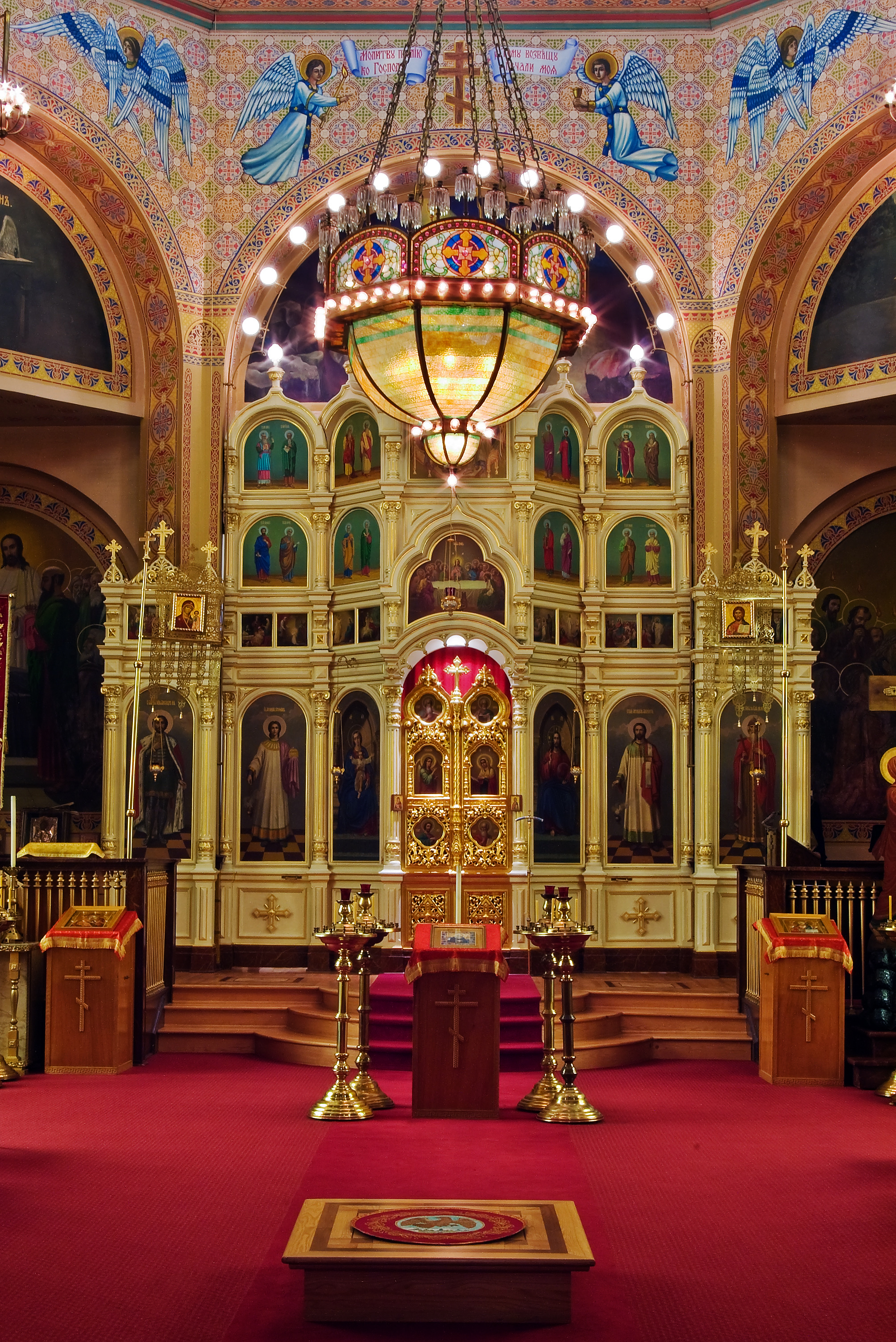
Russian Orthodox cathedra in Holy Trinity Orthodox Cathedral, Chicago

== See also ==
- Chapter (religion)
- Curule seat, Roman chair used as sign of power
- Episcopal see
- Pulpit
- Lists of cathedrals
