= Ziller (disambiguation) =

Ziller may refer to:

- Ziller, right-side tributary to the Inn River, in the Zillertal in Tyrol, Austria
  - Bruck am Ziller, municipality in the Schwaz district of Tyrol, Austria
  - Zell am Ziller, municipality in the Schwaz district of Tyrol, Austria
- Ziller (surname)
