= Zillner =

Zillner is a surname. Notable people with the surname include:

- Karl Zillner (1926–1983), Austrian politician
- Markus Zillner (born 1970), German tennis player
- Robert Zillner (born 1985), German footballer

== See also ==
- Ziller (surname)
- Zillmer
