= Stathatos Mansion =

Coordinates: 37°58′32″N 23°44′34″E

- Μέγαρο Σταθάτου
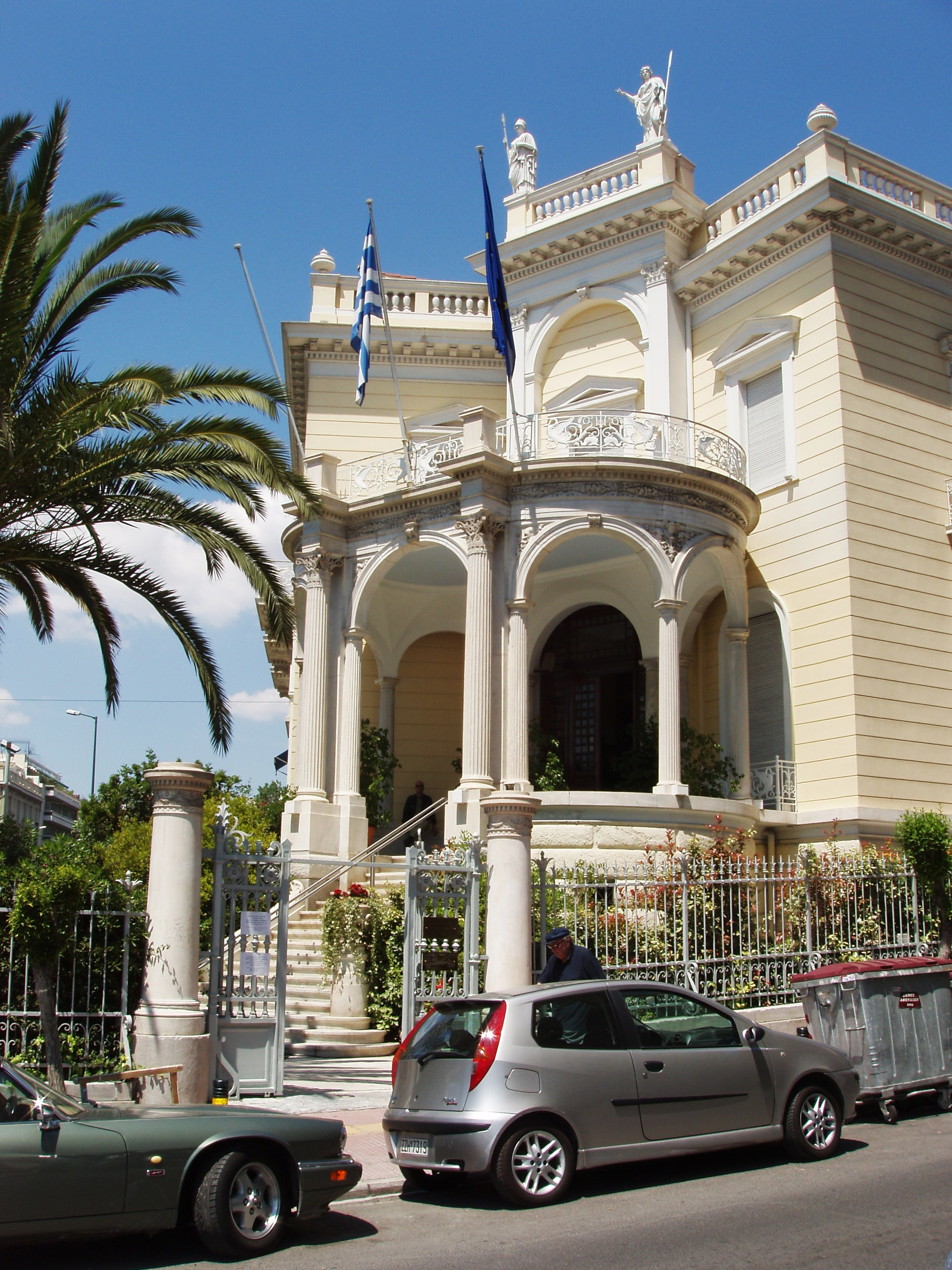
- Interactive map of the Stathatos Mansion area

General information
- Architectural style: Neoclassical
- Location: Athens, Greece, Vasilissis Sofias Avenue
- Completed: 1895

Design and construction
- Architect: Ernst Ziller

Website
- The Museum of Cycladic Art

Stathatos Mansion (Greek: Μέγαρο Σταθάτου, romanized: Megaro Stathatou) is a neoclassical villa on Vasilissis Sofias Avenue, Athens, Greece. Built for the Stathatos family in 1895, today it is part of the Goulandris Museum of Cycladic Art.

== History ==
The house was built in 1895 by the Saxon-Greek architect Ernst Ziller for Othon and Athina Stathatos. It remained the family's residence until 1938. In the following years it was rented for various official purposes. First it housed the Bulgarian Embassy, became a British officers' club in 1945, was rented to the Canadian Embassy until 1970, then became the Libyan embassy for four years.

In 1982 it was purchased by the Greek state, and was restored by architect Pavlos M. Kalligas for the purpose of hosting official state guests. However, after the completion of the renovations it was not deemed fit for the purpose, and was instead given over for use by the neighbouring Cycladic Art Museum in 1991.

The Athens 1996 committee for bringing the Olympic Games to Greece had its headquarters here.

== Architecture ==
The building is composed of two wings, nearly symmetrical, connected by an impressive entrance and a cylindrical atrium. On the whole, the building has many neoclassical characteristics: symmetry, geometrical order, use of ancient Greek and Roman orders, elegant shapes.

Front entrance

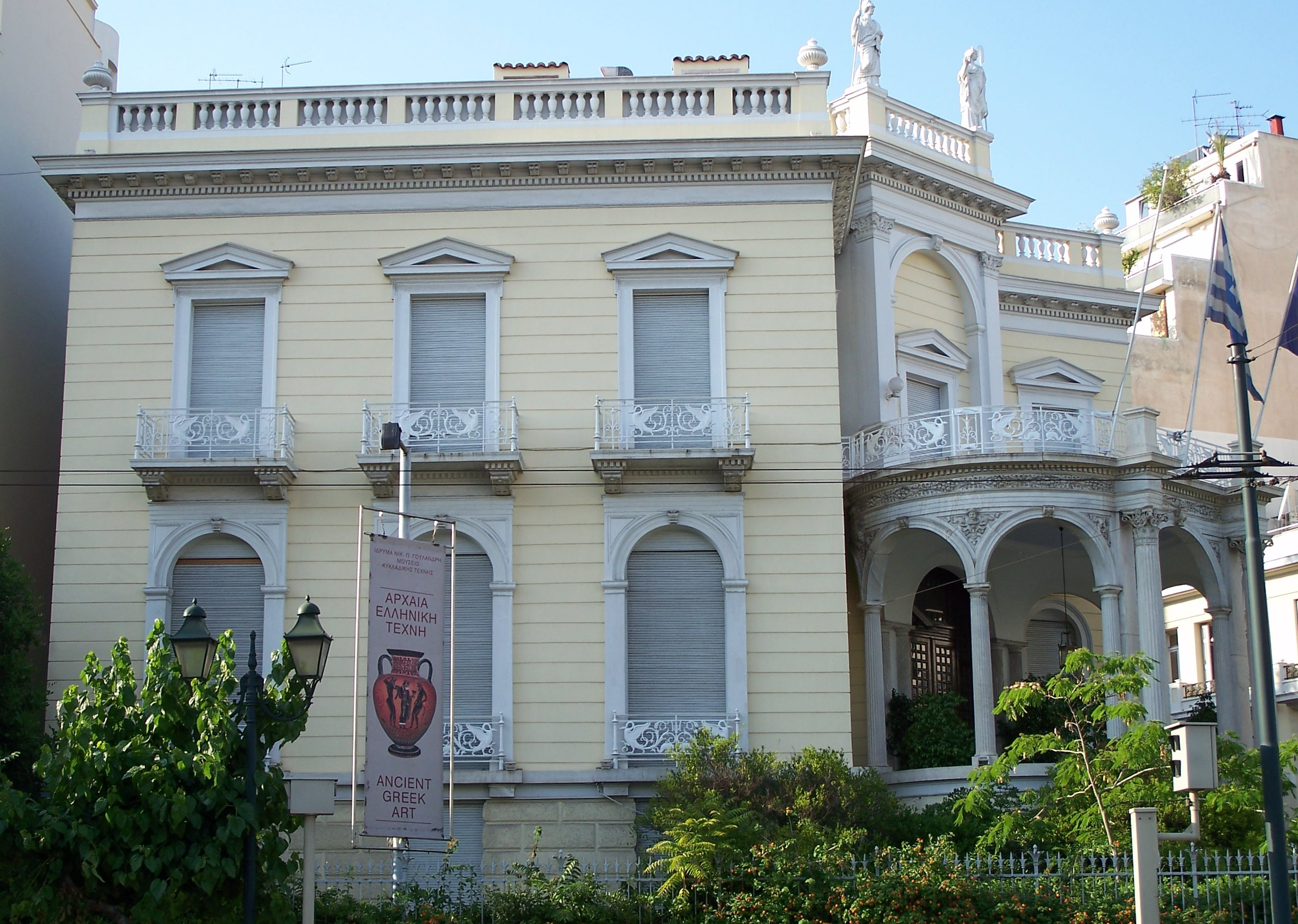
Exterior viewed from street

The entrance is one of the basic parts of the building, unifying the two wings and giving a character to the building. The plan is composed of a rectangle and two semicircles on the long sides of the rectangle. Four columns of the Tuscan order and four composite ones support the roofing, composed of eight vaults. Two columns of the Corinthian order give emphasis to the stairs that lead to the covered part of the entrance.

3D diagram of the entrance vaults

Plan of the Stathatos Mansion entrance

Front view of the Stathatos Mansion entrance
