= Church of St. Gregory Palamas =

Greek Orthodox church building in Thessaloniki, Greece

Saint Gregory Palamas Church
- Ιερός Ναός του Αγίου Γρηγορίου Παλαμά
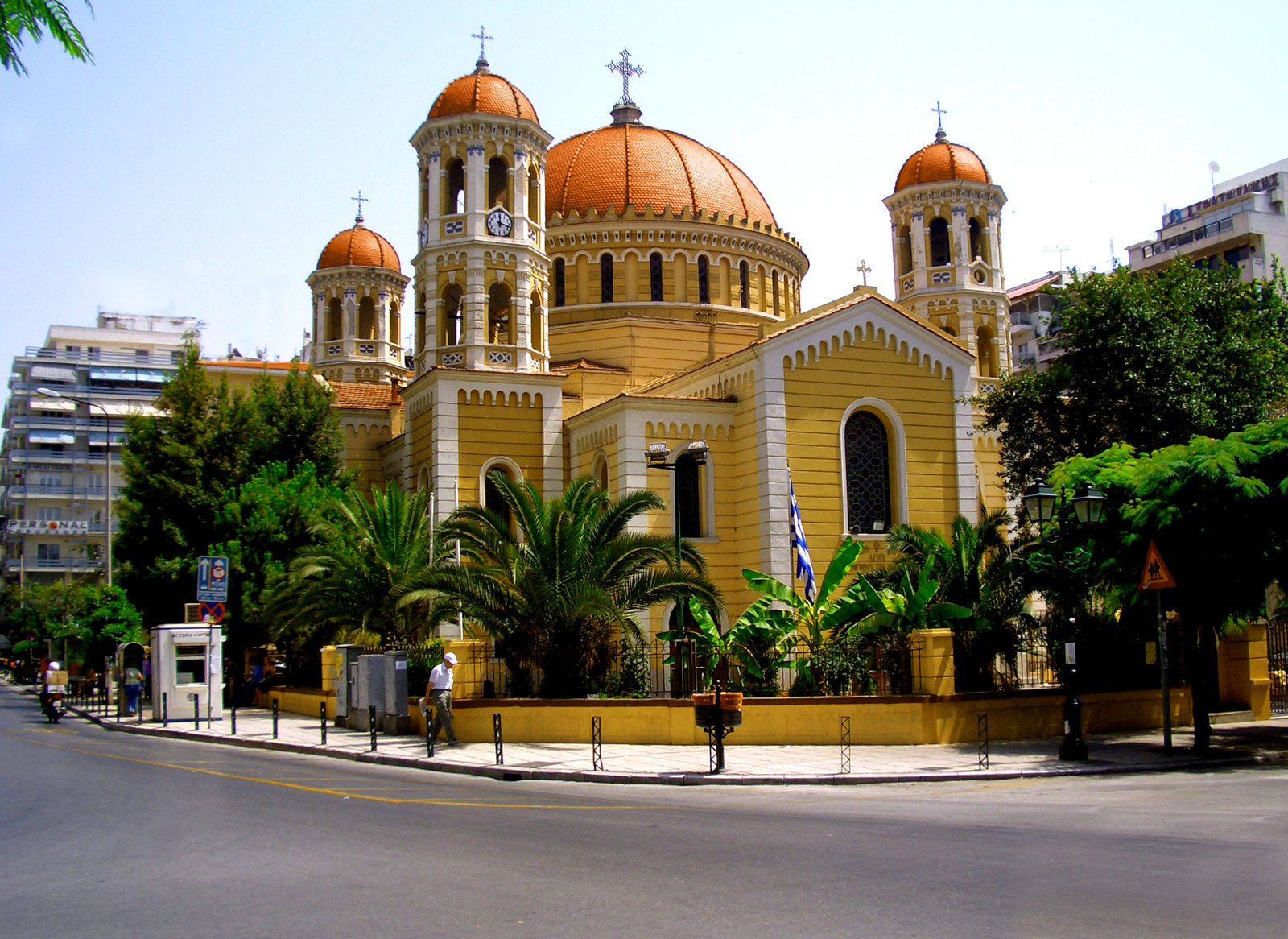
- View from the west

- Location of the church in Greece
- Saint Gregory Palamas Church
- 40°37′51″N 22°56′39″E
- Location: Thessaloniki, Central Macedonia
- Country: Greece
- Denomination: Greek Orthodox Church

History
- Status: Church
- Dedication: Saint Gregory Palamas
- Consecrated: 21 April 1914
- Events: 1978 Thessaloniki earthquake

Architecture
- Functional status: Active
- Architects: Ernst Ziller; Achileas Kambanakis; Konstantinos Kokinakas; Xenophon Paionidis
- Architectural type: Church
- Style: Byzantine Revival; Eclecticism
- Groundbreaking: 16 June 1891
- Completed: 1906

Administration
- Metropolis: Thessaloniki

The Metropolitan Church of Saint Gregory Palamas (Greek: Ιερός Ναός του Αγίου Γρηγορίου Παλαμά) is a Greek Orthodox church, located in Thessaloniki, in Central Macedonia, Greece. The church, dedicated to Saint Gregory Palamas, was built in 1914 in an eclectic Byzantine Revival style, on the site of an earlier church that was completed in c. 13th – c. 14th centuries and destroyed by fire in 1890. The church forms part of the Metropolis of Thessaloniki, administered by the Church of Greece.

== History ==
=== Old church building ===
The church is located in the centre of the city, at the intersection of Metropolis and Hagia Sophia streets. A church dedicated to St. Demetrius, the patron saint of Thessaloniki, existed on this site during the Ottoman era and was the cathedral of the city. The church was built from the end of the 13th century to the beginning of the 14th century by Emperor Andronikos II Palaiologos (1282–1328) and is a three-aisled basilica dedicated to the Virgin Mary. After the 1430 conquest of Thessaloniki by the Ottomans and the conversion of the Cathedral of St. Demetrius into a mosque in 1491, the Church of the Theotokos was rechristened after St. Demetrius, the patron saint of Thessaloniki. When the next cathedral, the Rotunda of St. Archangels (also called the Rotunda of Galerius), was also converted into a mosque in 1590, the waterfront church became the city's cathedral. In 1699, it was renovated under Metropolitan Ignatius Lesbosets. During the Greek Revolution of 1821, hundreds of Thessalonians sought refuge in the church, but the Ottomans broke down the doors and massacred them. The miraculous icon of Saint Demetrius, the Patriarchal Throne, and many documents of the Greek community are kept in the church.

On 22 August 1890, this church was completely destroyed by a large fire. In October 1890, Metropolitan Sophronios (1889–1893) applied for a permit to build a new church, which was issued in early June 1891. The permit stated that the new church of St. Demetrius would also have two chapels – one to the north, dedicated to Gregory Palamas, and one to the south, dedicated to St. Nicholas. Following a request by the Greek Prime Minister Charilaos Trikoupis, the banker Andreas Syngros added 8,600 Ottoman lira to the 6,500 lira collected by the Greek community of Thessaloniki, and construction of the new church began.

=== Current church building ===
Ernst Ziller was chosen as the architect of the building. In the same year of 1890, he was also one of the architects who drew up the plans for the Metropolitan Church of Panagia Faneromeni in Aigio, and the two churches architecturally resemble each other. The supervision of the project was entrusted to Ziller's student Achilleas Kambanakis. The foundation stone of the church was laid on 16 June 1891, by Metropolitan Sophronios. Construction was hampered because the soil was unstable, since the site was close to the sea. Work halted in 1892 because the municipality accused the design contractors of using poor-quality materials, and of deviating from Ziller's original plan. Kambanakis was dismissed, and Konstantinos Kokinakis was appointed in his place, but Kambanakis refused to provide the designs, and Ziller stated that he had no copies. As a result, construction stopped, and the municipality spent the money.

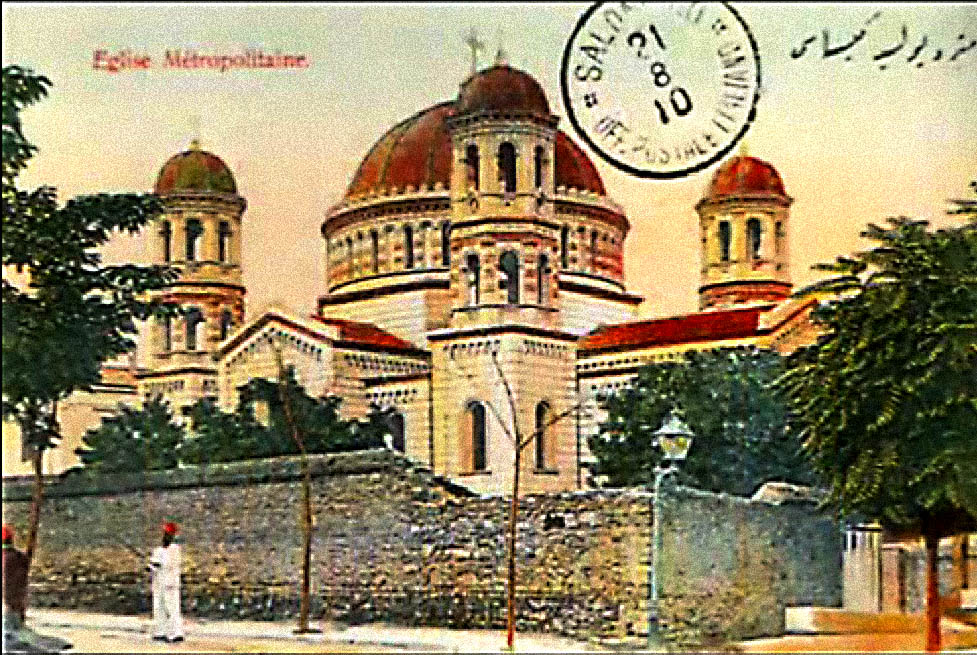
An Ottoman-era postcard of the church, c. 1900s

The outbreak of the Greco-Turkish War of 1897 further hindered the resumption of construction. It was not until 1900 that Metropolitan Athanasios (1893–1903) began to raise money for the construction of the church. Work resumed on 8 July 1902, and the completion of the church was entrusted to the architect Xenophon Paionidis, the official architect of the municipality of Thessaloniki. Paionidis largely followed Ziller's plans as the church was half-built, but also made changes where possible. Rough construction was completed on 17 June 1906, and the church was fully finished in late 1909. The cost was 302,229.30 gold lira.

The construction of the church went along with the construction of the Greek Consulate General (1890–1893), today the Museum for the Macedonian Struggle, also the work of Ziller. The two buildings are connected by a secret door and were the headquarters of the Greek armed propaganda in Macedonia from 1904–1908.

The church was inaugurated when the city was already part of Greece, on 21 April 1914, by Metropolitan Gennadios (1912–1951). As the old St. Demetrios Cathedral was now a Christian church again, the new metropolitan church was dedicated to St. Gregory Palamas instead of St. Demetrios.

The 1978 Thessaloniki earthquake caused extensive damage to the church. The probable cause was the poor materials used in the original construction and the deviations from Ziller's original plans. Some people called for its demolition, while others wanted it to be repaired. Finally, after significant reconstruction, the church was reopened on 13 November 1980.

== Architecture ==
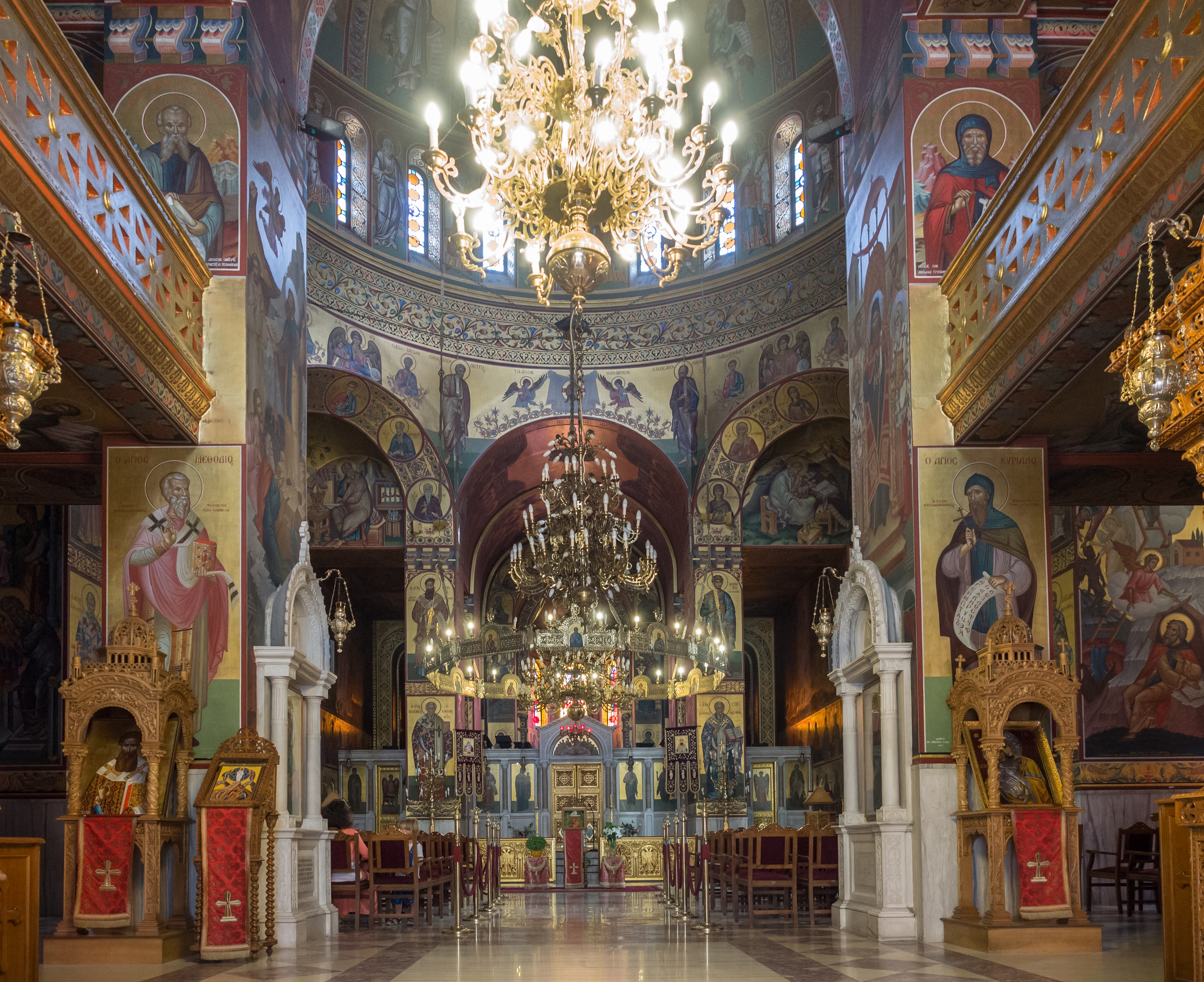
The interior of the church

The architecture of the church was atypical for the time. In the 19th century, three-aisled basilicas dominated in Thessaloniki and Macedonia, while the church belongs to the neo-Byzantine octagonal church type with a dome that became established in independent Greece. It has an eclectic mix of neo-classical, neo-Romanesque, and neo-Renaissance characteristics, and follows the trend characterizing Thessaloniki architecture at the end of the 19th century. The nave is in the form of an inscribed equilateral cross and is covered by a large dome, and there are four tall bell towers on four sides of the building.

The interior was painted by the Constantinople painter Nikolaos Kessanlis, who arrived in Thessaloniki in April 1911. The relics of Saint Gregory Palamas are kept in the church.

== See also ==
- Church of Greece – Autocephalous church of Eastern Orthodox Christianity
- History of Thessaloniki – Ancient city in Macedonia, Greece
- Paleochristian and Byzantine monuments of Thessaloniki
