= Zillmer =

Zillmer is a surname. Notable people with the surname include:

- Eileen Zillmer (born 1952), German figure skater
- Ray Zillmer (1887–1960), American attorney, mountaineer, and conservationist

== See also ==
- Ziller (surname)
- Zillmere, Queensland
- Zillner
