= Iosifina Dimas-Ziller =

Greek painter (1885–1965)

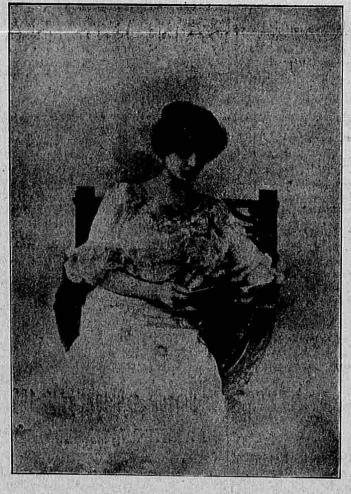
- Born: 1885; Piraeus, Greece
- Died: 1965 (aged 79–80); Athens, Greece
- Education: Athens School of Fine Arts
- Movement: Impressionism

Iosifina Dimas-Ziller (Greek: Ιωσηφίνα Δήμα-Τσίλερ; 1885–1965) was a Greek painter.

== Life ==
Iosifina Dimas-Ziller was born in Piraeus in 1885. She was the daughter of Ernst Ziller and Greek female pianist Sofia Doudou. She was the wife of painter and icon painter Dimitris Dimas. She studied music in Vienna, Dresden and in the Fine Arts School of Athens near George Iakovidis. She had made personal exhibitions and participated in group exhibitions as well.

== Artistic work ==
An important part of her work are portraits and landscapes as well as interiors and scenes from everyday life. The style of her works is in the context of Impressionism. Her works today are in the Koutlidis Collection, the Municipal Art Galleries of Athens and Piraeus, and the Ministry of Education.
