= Ernst Ziller =

19th-century German-Greek architect

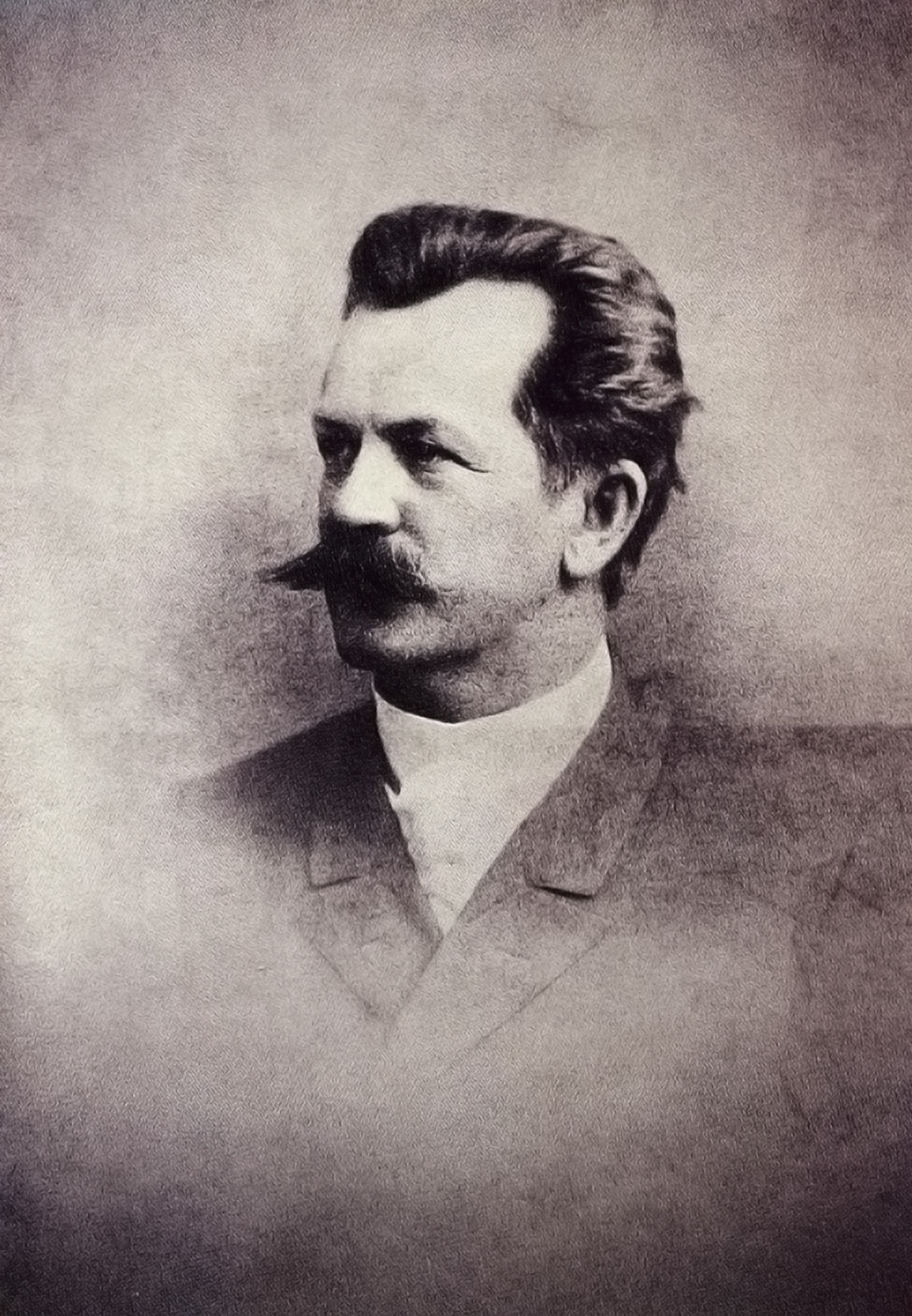
- Portrait of Ernst Ziller (c. 1880)
- Born: Ernst Moritz Theodor Ziller; 22 June 1837; Serkowitz, Radebeul, Kingdom of Saxony
- Died: 4 November 1923 (aged 86); Athens, Kingdom of Greece
- Other name: Ερνέστος Τσίλλερ (Ernestos Tsiller)
- Education: Dresden Academy of Fine Arts
- Occupation: Architect
- Spouse: Sophia Doudou-Ziller
- Children: Iosifina Dimas-Ziller (1885-1965)

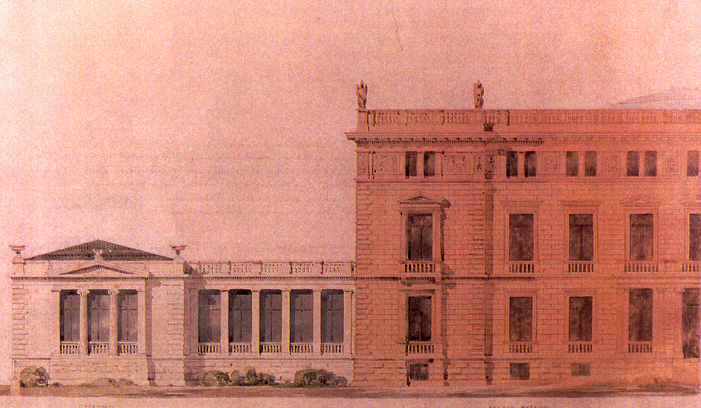
Ernst Ziller's plan for the extension to the ballroom of the crown prince's palace in Athens (Presidential Mansion).

Ernst Moritz Theodor Ziller (/ˈzɪlər/; Greek: Ερνέστος Τσίλλερ, Ernestos Tsiller [ˈtsiler]; 22 June 1837 – 4 November 1923) was a German-born university teacher and architect who later became a Greek national. In the late 19th and early 20th centuries, he was a major designer of royal and municipal buildings in Athens, Patras, and other Greek cities, mostly in neoclassical style.

== Biography ==
Ziller was born in the rural community of Serkowitz in the district of Radebeul in the Kingdom of Saxony. After graduating from the Dresden Academy of Fine Arts in 1858, he went to work for Danish architect Theophilus Hansen. In 1861, Hansen sent him to Athens. In 1872 he was appointed a professor at the Royal School of Arts, now National Technical University of Athens.

He was married to a Greek wife, Sofia Doudou. His daughter Iosifina Dimas-Ziller (1885–1965) was an impressionist painter.

In 1885, he designed a three-story neoclassical mansion where his family resided until 1912. The residence was later acquired by the Greek banker Dionysios Loverdos (1878–1934). It is now called the Ziller-Loverdos Mansion and since 2021 has housed the Loverdos Museum, a branch of the Byzantine and Christian Museum of Athens.

Ziller died in Athens and was buried at the First Cemetery of Athens.

== List of buildings ==
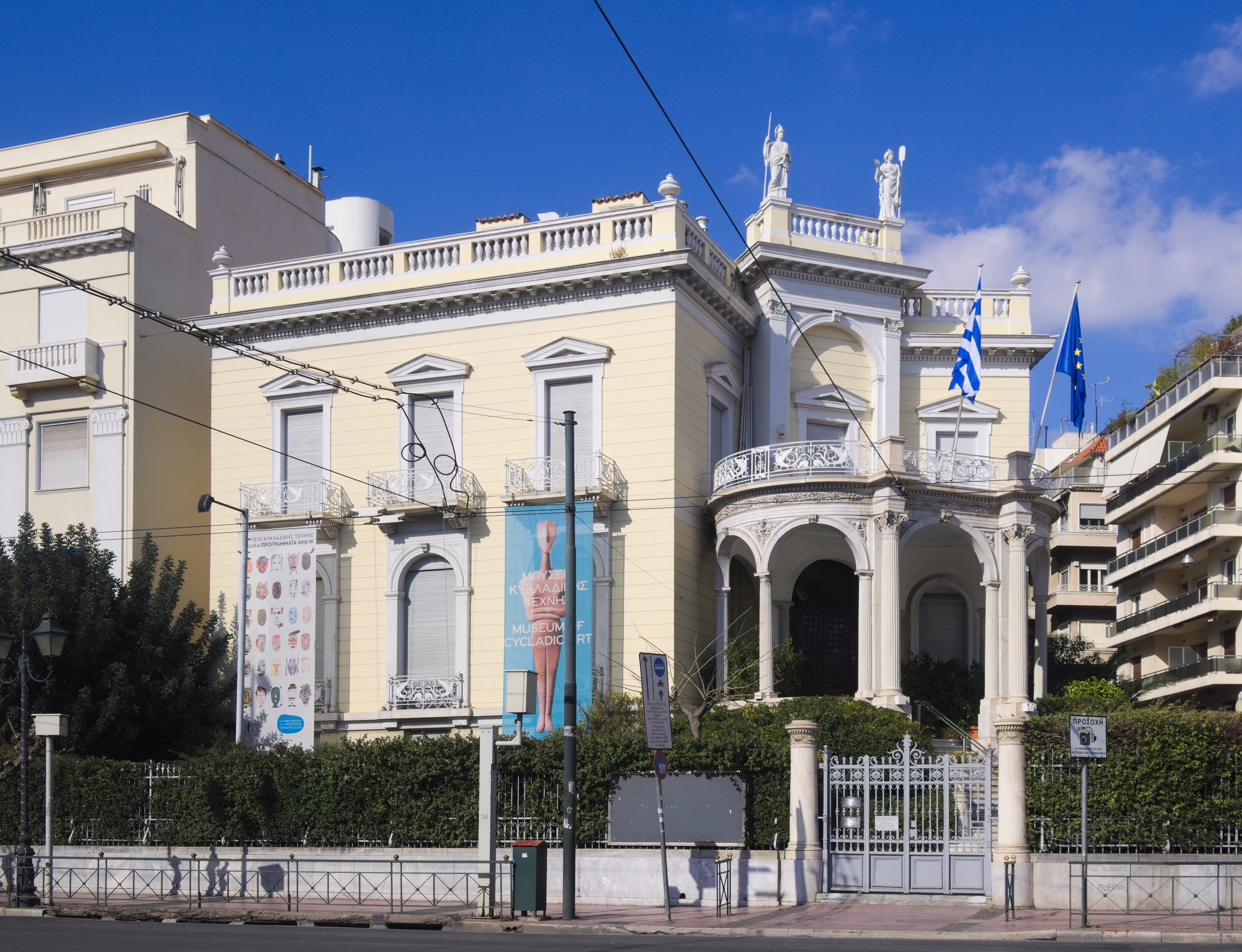
Stathatos Mansion.

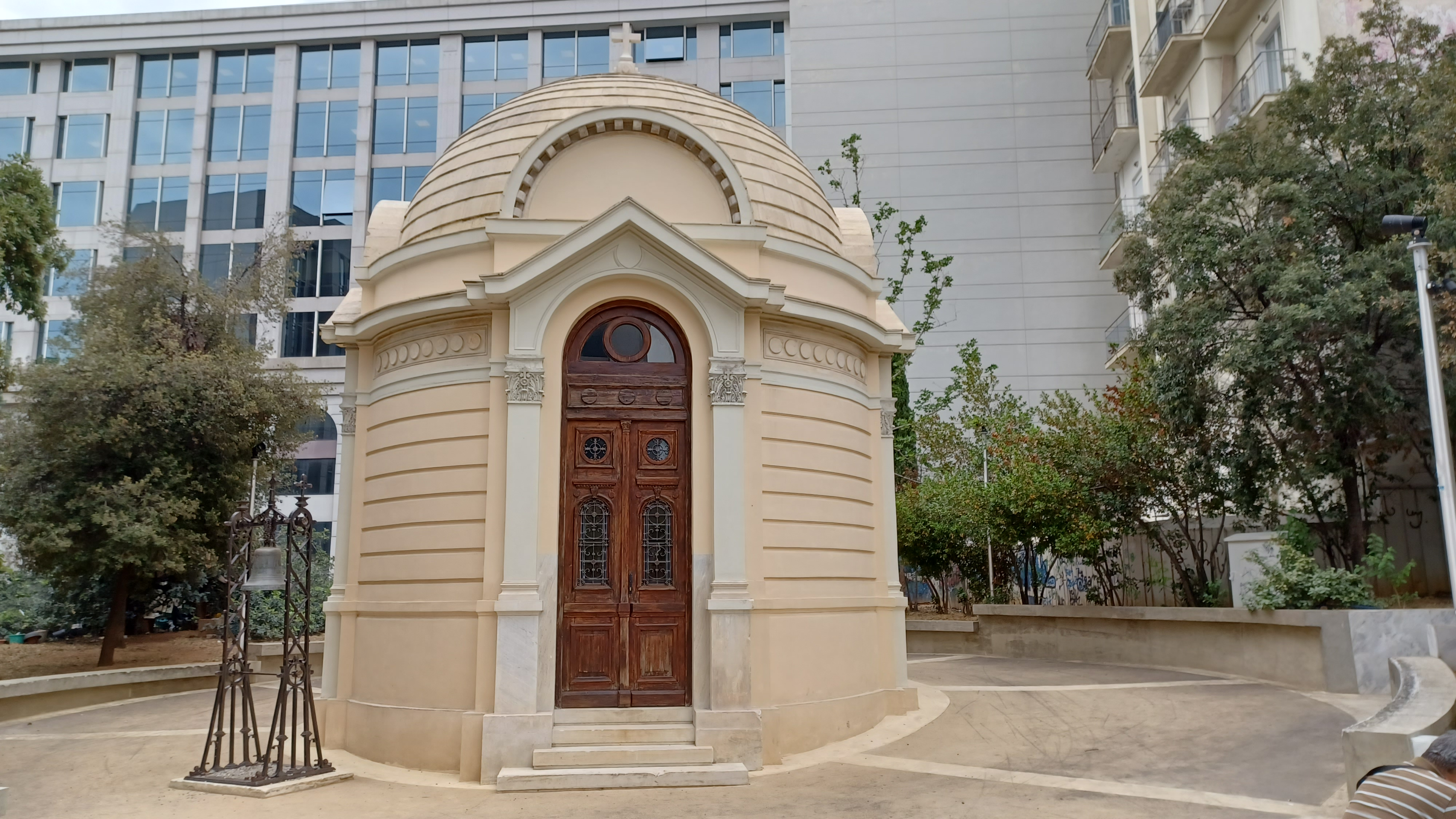
Church of Agios Nikolaos Thon

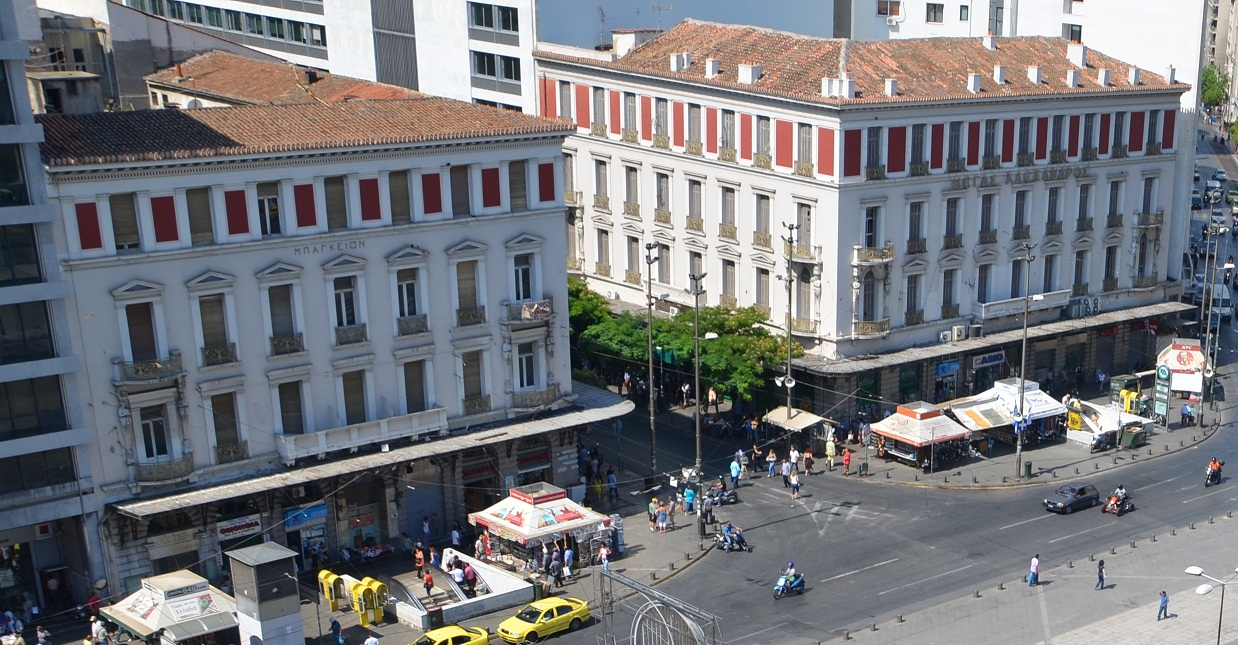
Hotels "Megas Alexandros" and "Bakeion", Omonoia Square.

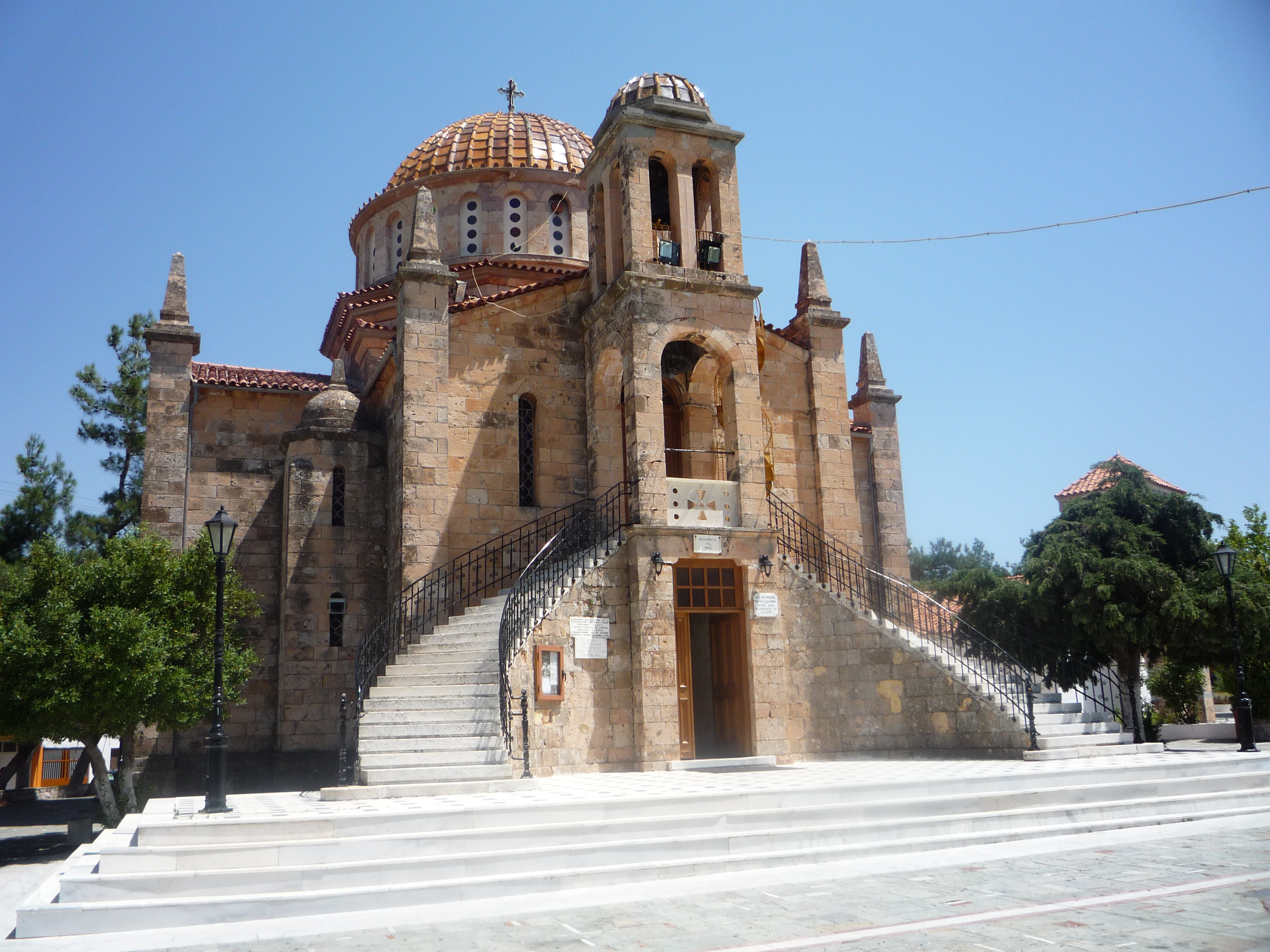
Transfiguration of Jesus (Metamorfosis Sotiros) Church in Vilia, West Attica.

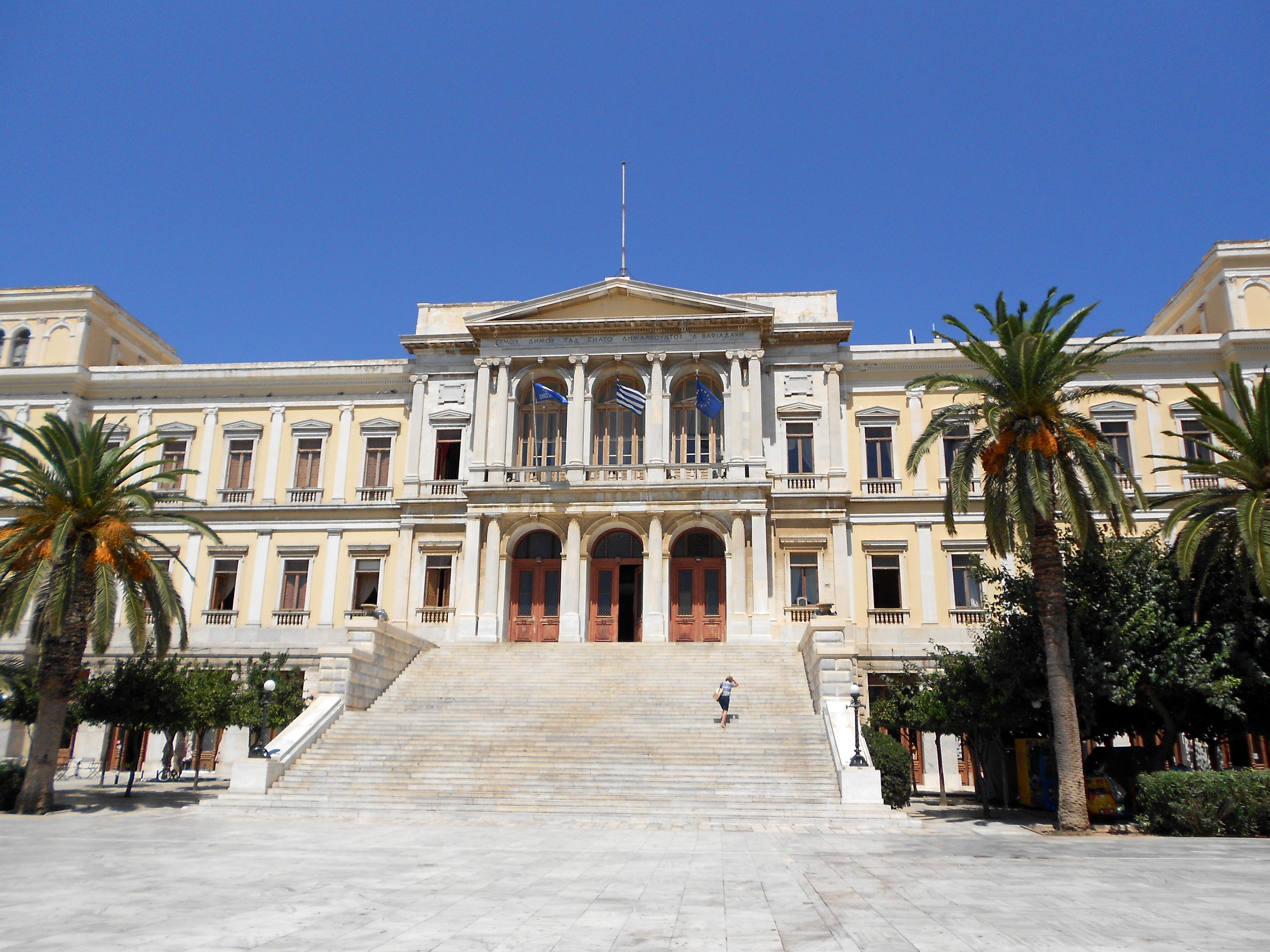
Ermoupolis City Hall.

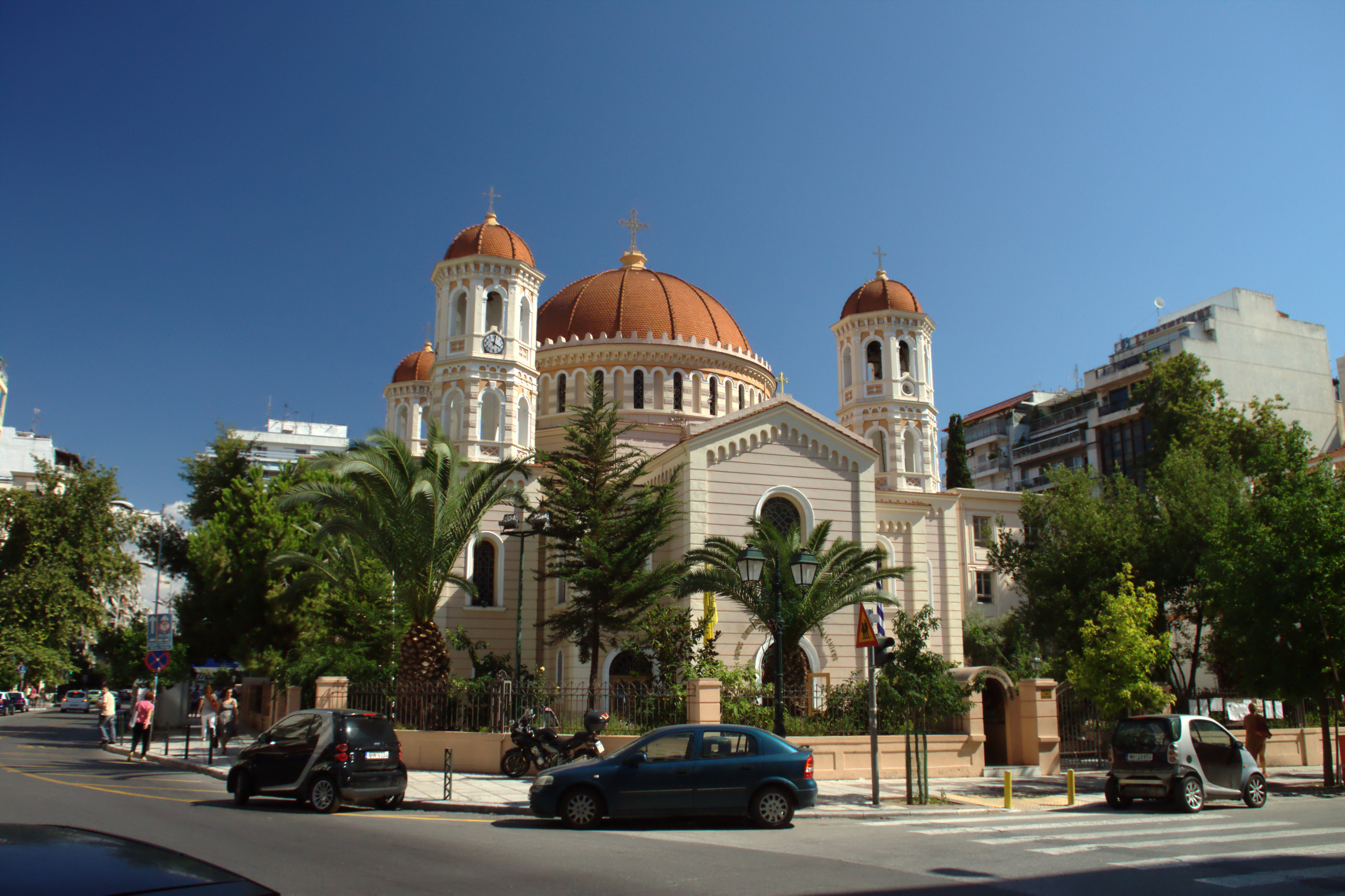
Metropolitan Church of St. Gregory Palamas, Thessaloniki.

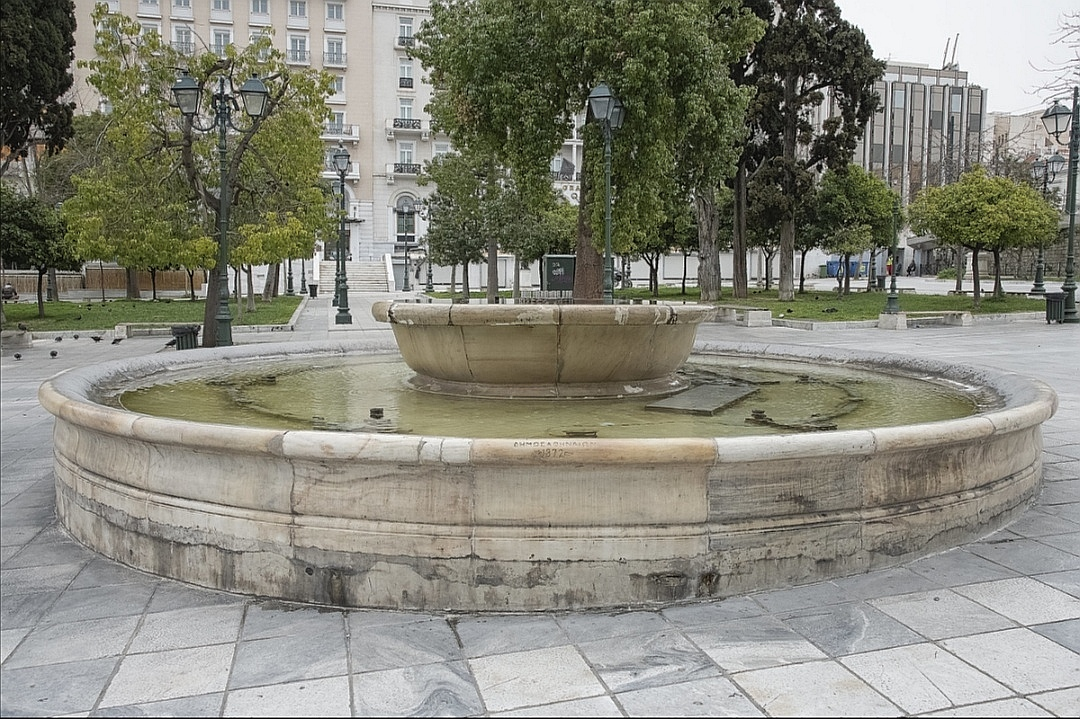
The marble fountain at Syntagma Square, Athens (1872).

Below is a list of buildings designed by Ernst Ziller.

=== Athens ===
- Andreas Syngros mansion (now Ministry of Foreign Affairs)
- Church of Saint Luke
- Hotels "Megas Alexandros" and "Bakeion", Omonoia Square
- Iliou Melathron (now Numismatic Museum of Athens)
- Mela Megaron
- National Chemistry Institute of Greece (at the University of Athens)
- National Theatre of Greece
- Old building of the Hellenic Military Academy
- Old headquarters building of the National Bank of Greece
- Peloponnese Railway Station
- Presidential Mansion
- Stathatos Mansion
- Thon mansion (destroyed during the Dekemvriana)
- Church of Agios Nikolaos Thon, the only surviving building from the Thon Estate
- Villa Atlantis
- Loverdos Museum (former Ziller mansion, Academy Street 58a)

=== Attica ===
- Transfiguration of Jesus church in Vilia, West Attica
- Royal palace in Tatoi

=== Aigio ===
- Archaeological Museum of Aigion (old Municipal market)
- Cathedral Church of Panagia Faneromeni
- Church of Esodia of Theotokos
- Church of St. Andrew

=== Argos ===
- Municipal Market of Argos

=== Gytheio ===
- City Hall of Gytheio
- Parthenagogeio (Girls School) of Gytheio

=== Patras ===
- Apollon Theatre (Patras)
- Perivolaropoulos mansion

=== Piraeus ===
- Metaxa Mansion

=== Pyrgos ===
- Archaeological Museum of Pyrgos (old Municipal Market)
- Municipal Theater of Pyrgos
- Old City Hall
- Railway station of Pyrgos

=== Syros ===
- Ermoupolis City Hall

=== Thessaloniki ===
- Greek consulate in Thessaloniki (today the Museum for the Macedonian Struggle)
- Metropolitan Church of St. Gregory Palamas
- Metropolis building
- Theageneio Hospital

=== Others ===
- Archaeological Museum of Milos
- Court House of Tripoli
- Church of Sainte Marina, Velo, Corinthia
- Metropolitan Theater of Zakynthos
- Railway station of Olympia
- Former City Hall of Kea
- Former Primary School of Kea (now town hall)
- Marble fountain of 1872 at Syntagma Square

== Architectural supervision ==
- Academy of Athens
- National Archaeological Museum of Athens
- National Library of Greece
- Panathinaiko Stadium, renovation

== Gallery ==
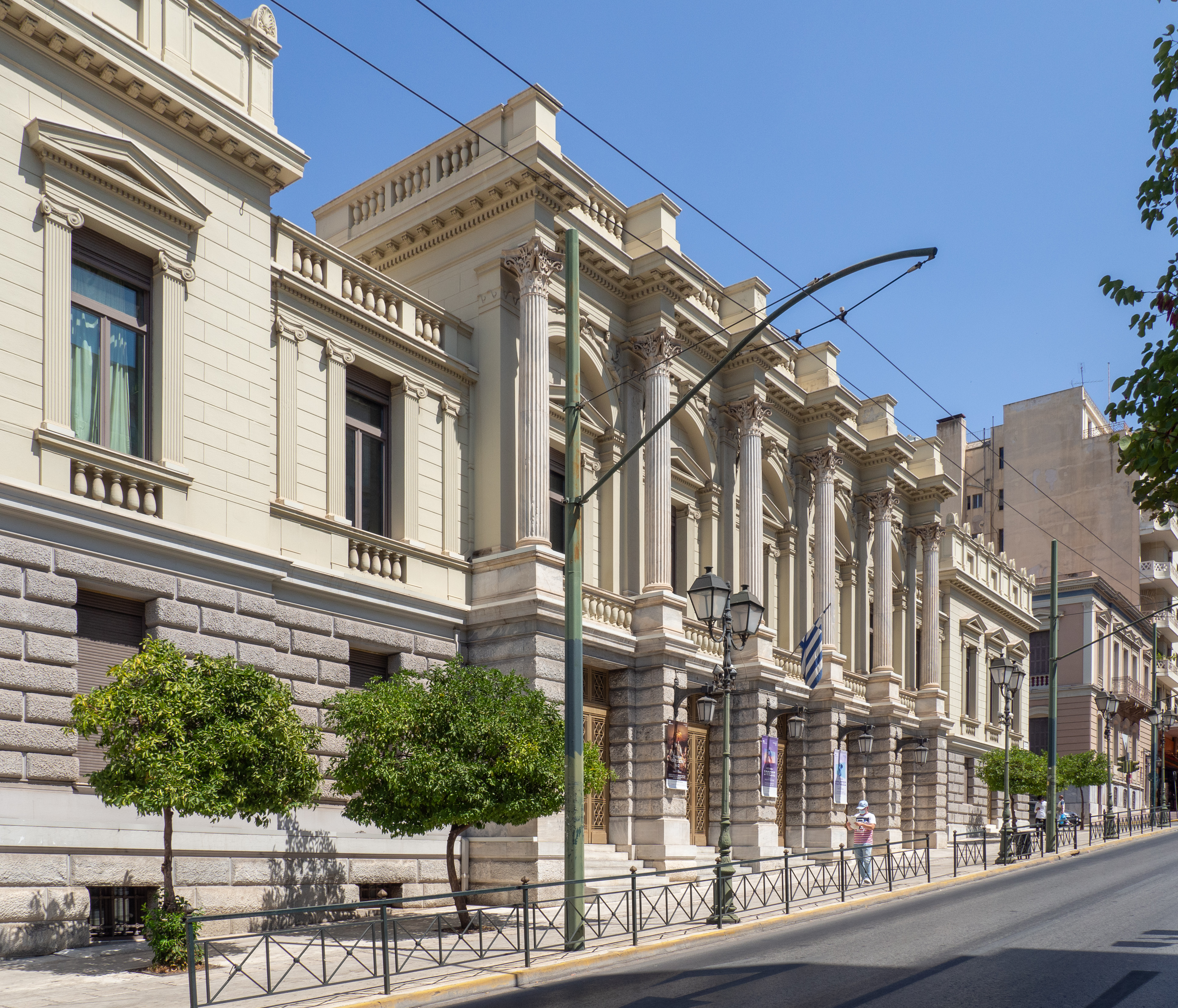
National Theatre of Greece

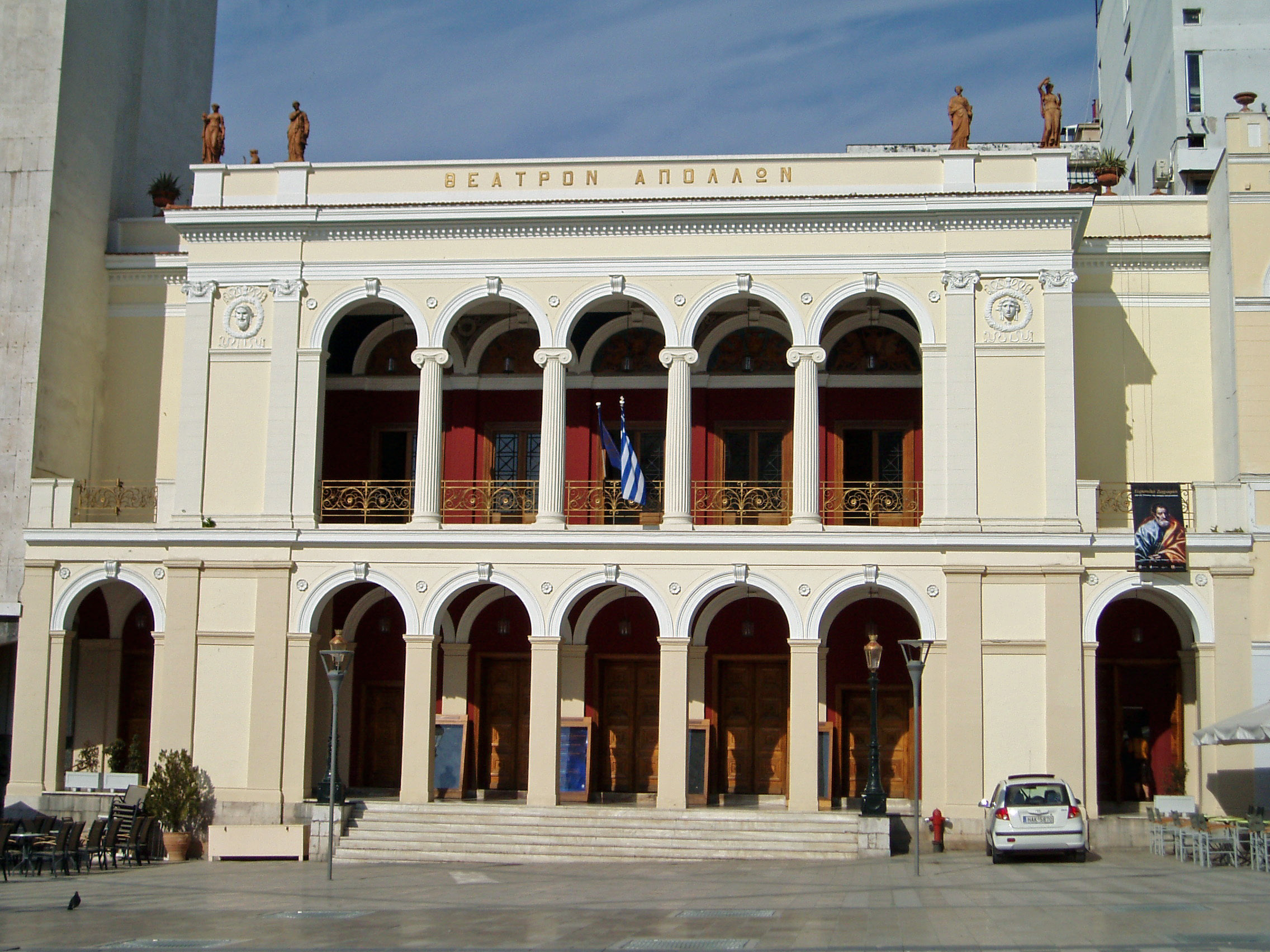
Apollon Theatre, Patras

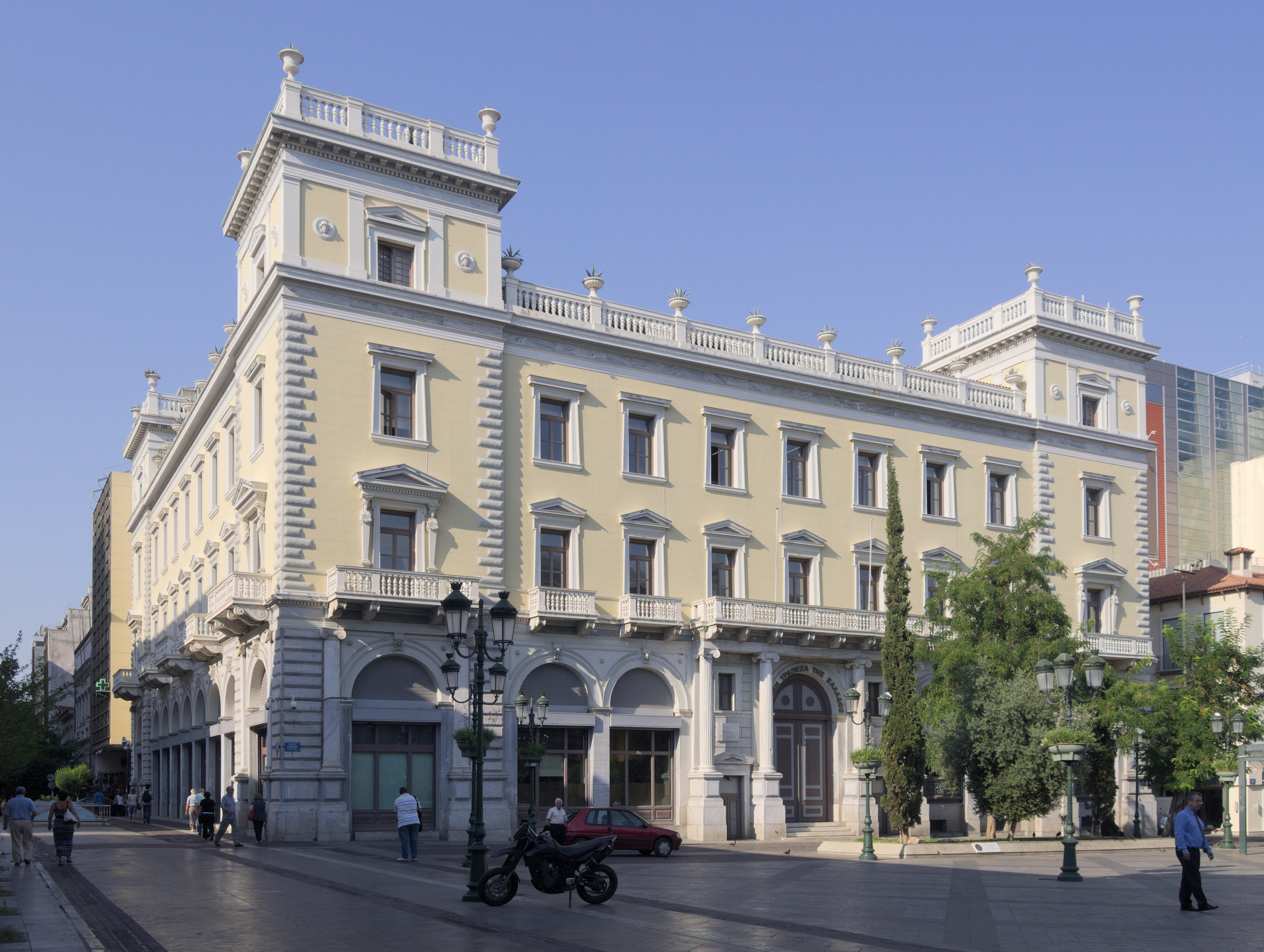
Melas Mansion, Athens

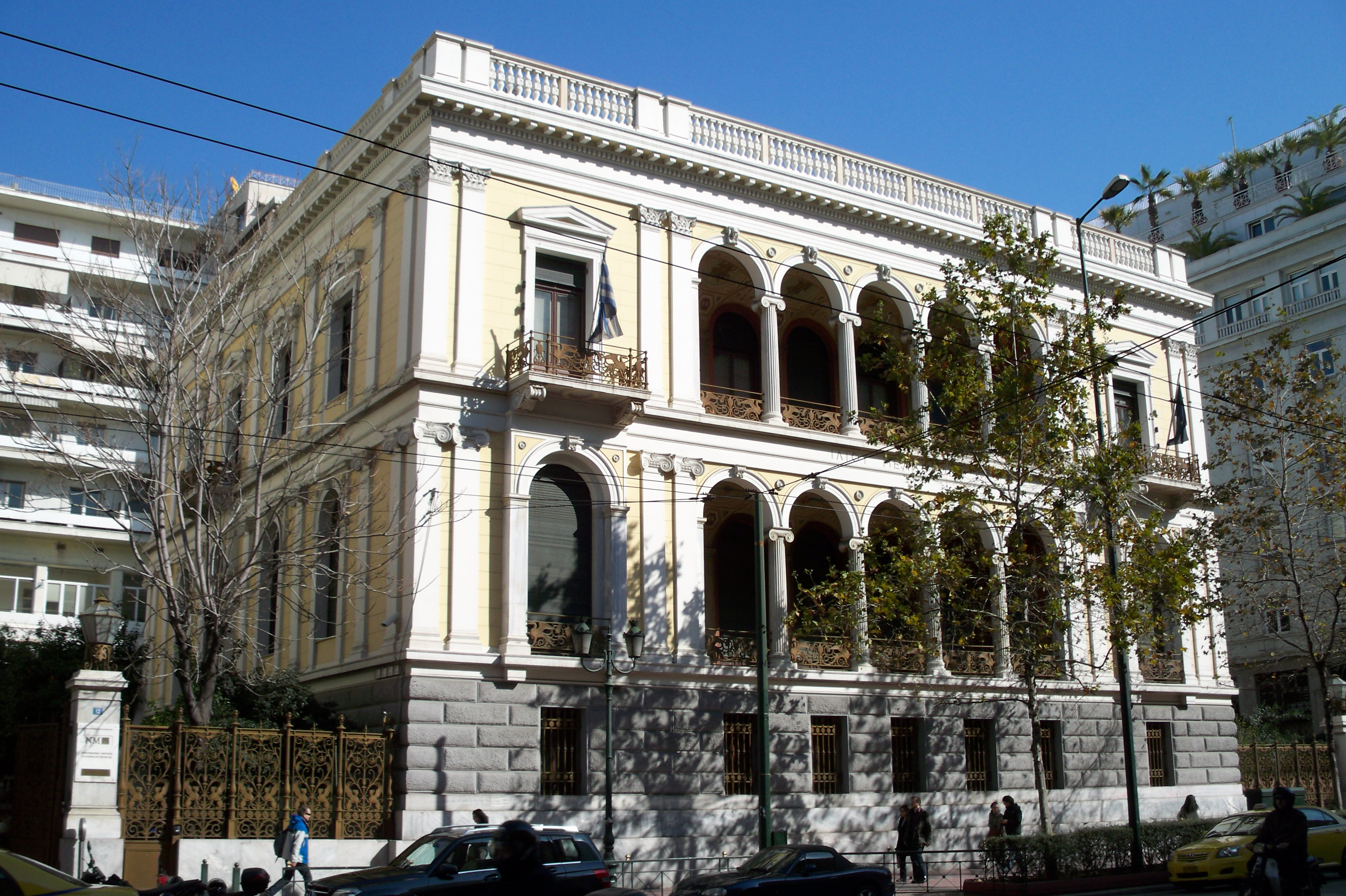
Numismatic Museum of Athens

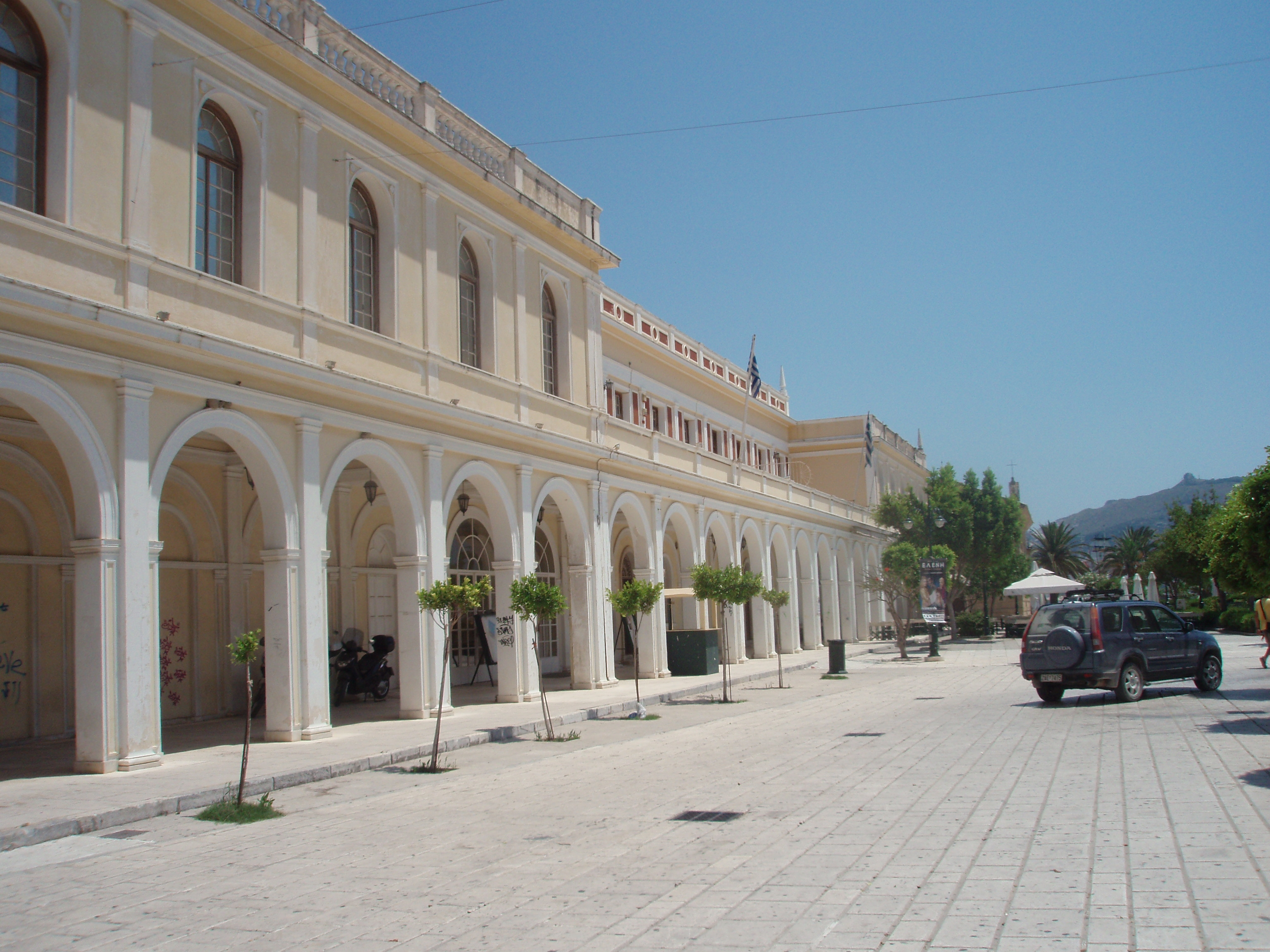
Metropolitan Theater of Zakynthos (city)

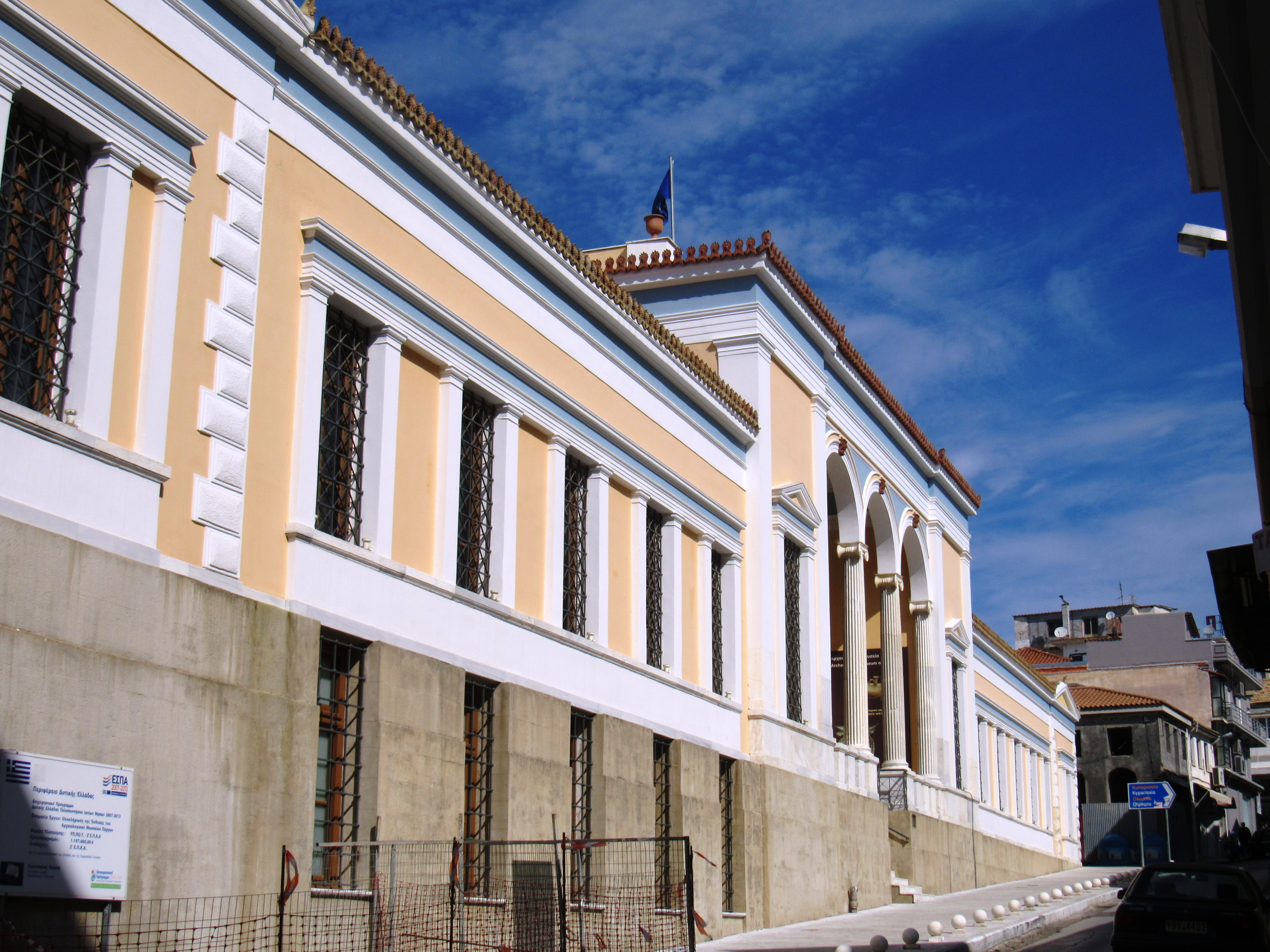
Old municipal market of Pyrgos, Elis

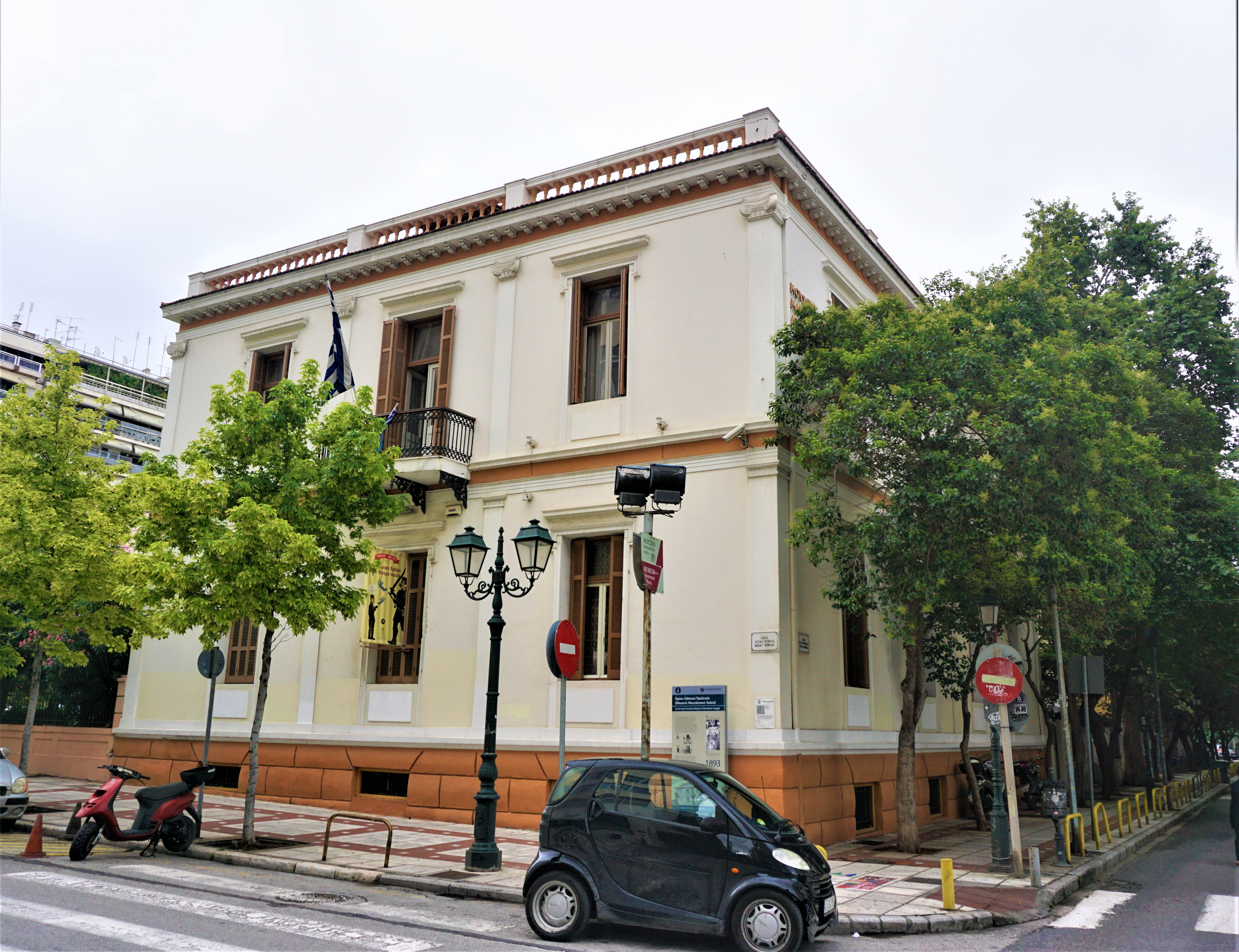
Museum for the Macedonian Struggle, Thessaloniki

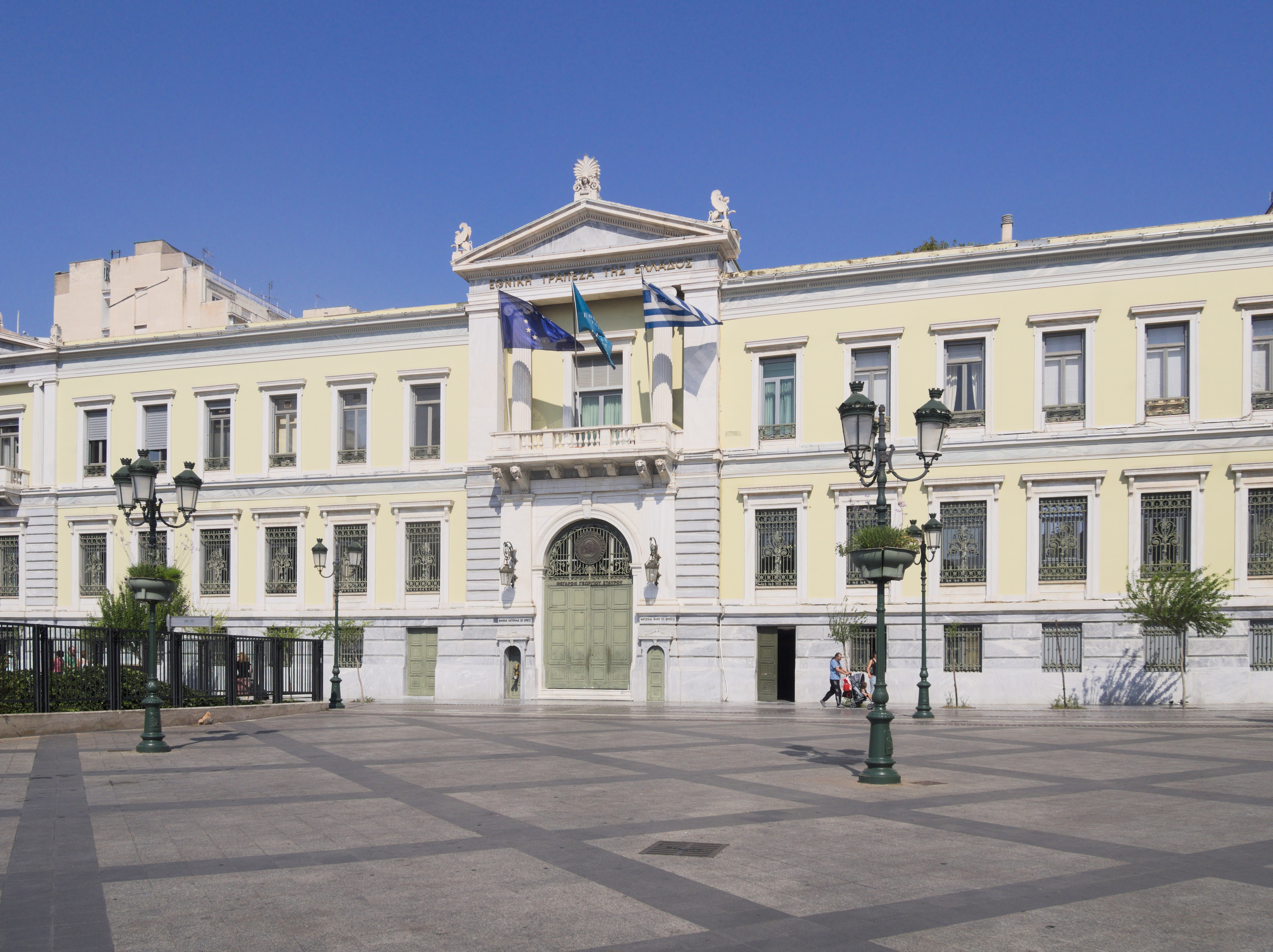
The old headquarters building of the National Bank of Greece

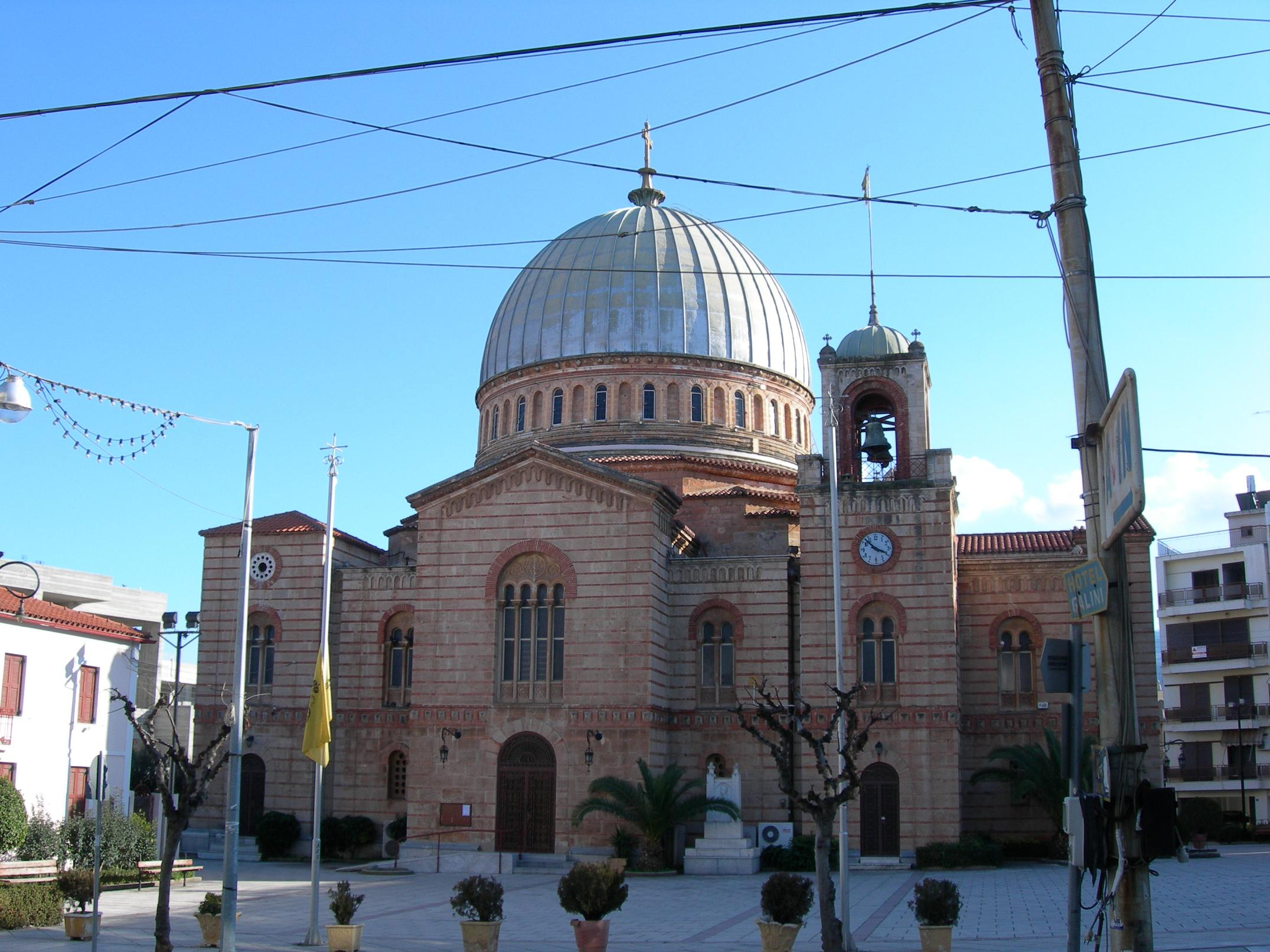
Panagia Faneromeni Church, Aigio

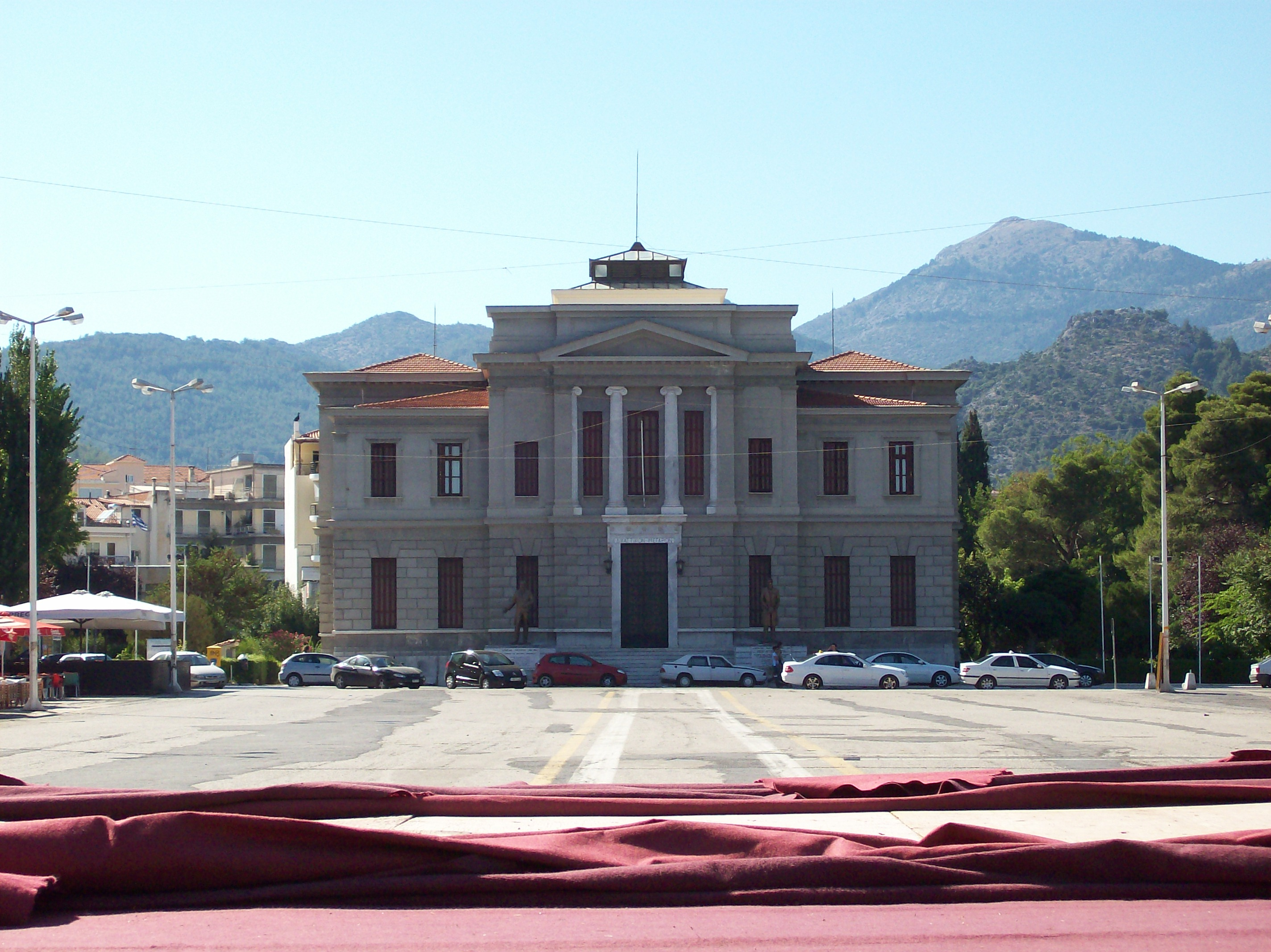
The Court House of Tripoli

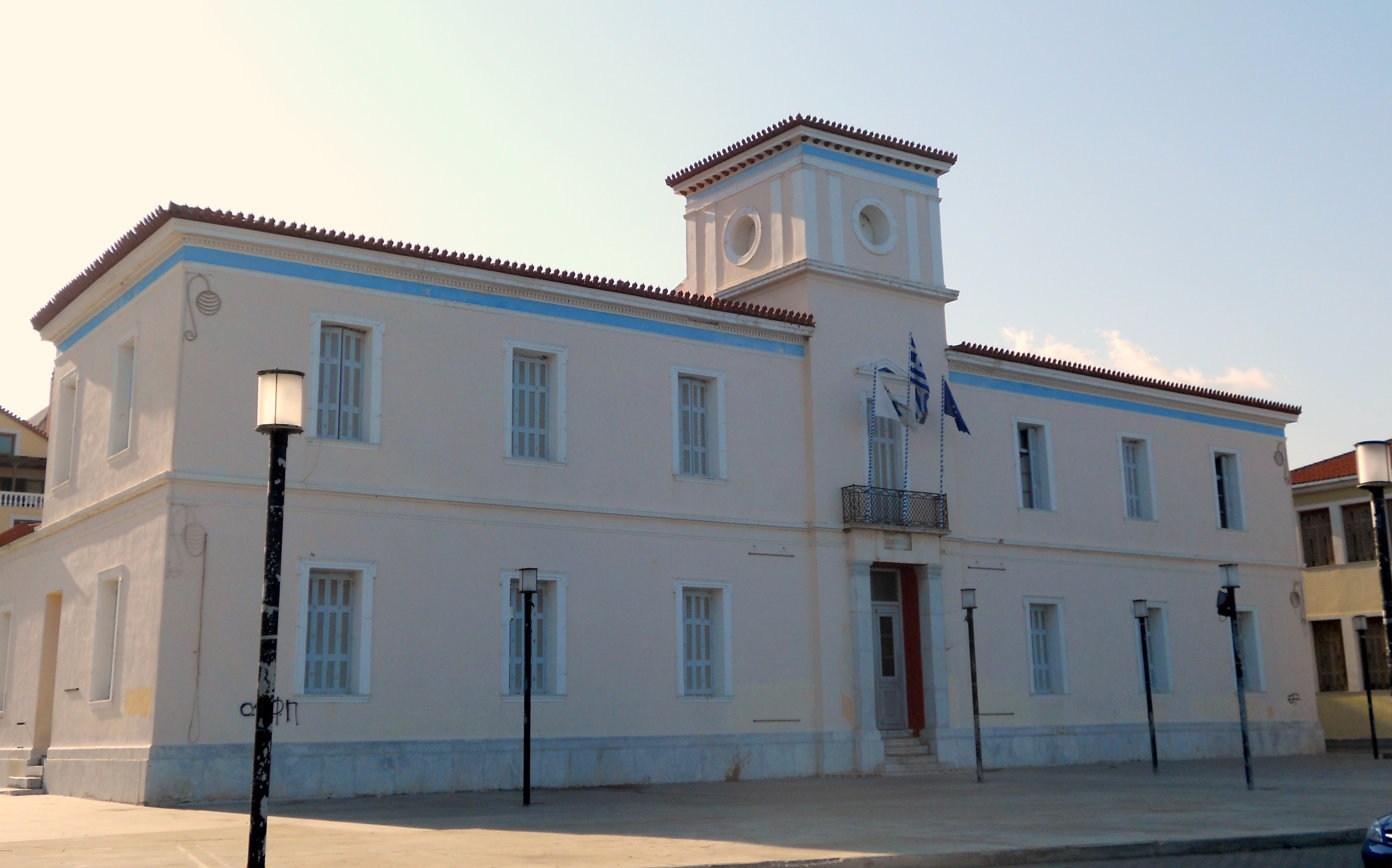
City Hall of Gytheio

== Sources ==
- Friedbert Ficker (2003). Ernst Ziller – ein sächsischer Architekt und Bauforscher in Griechenland: Die Familie Ziller Taschenbuc. Allgäu: Der Kunstverlag Josef Fink. ISBN 978-3898700764. (in German)
