= Equal-armed cross =

Cross symbol

Equal-armed crosses

The equal-armed cross, also referred to as the square cross, the balanced cross, and the peaceful cross, is a cross, consisting of two intersecting lines, usually perpendicular to each other, with all arms of equal length. The Greek cross is an equal-armed cross with the lines running vertically and horizontally. The saltire is a diagonal equal-armed cross, sometimes with the two intersecting lines that are not perpendicular to each other. Equal-armed crosses are symbols that have been found since ancient times in different cultures and traditions throughout the world.

== Significance ==
It is often interpreted as representing either the four seasons, four winds, four elements, or some other aspect of physical nature.

In the Albanian tradition the equal-armed cross (and its variant swastika) is the traditional way to symbolize the deified Fire – Zjarri, evidently also called with the theonym Enji. They are commonly found in a variety of contexts of Albanian folk art, including traditional tattooing, grave art, jewellery, embroidery, and house carvings.

== Other ==
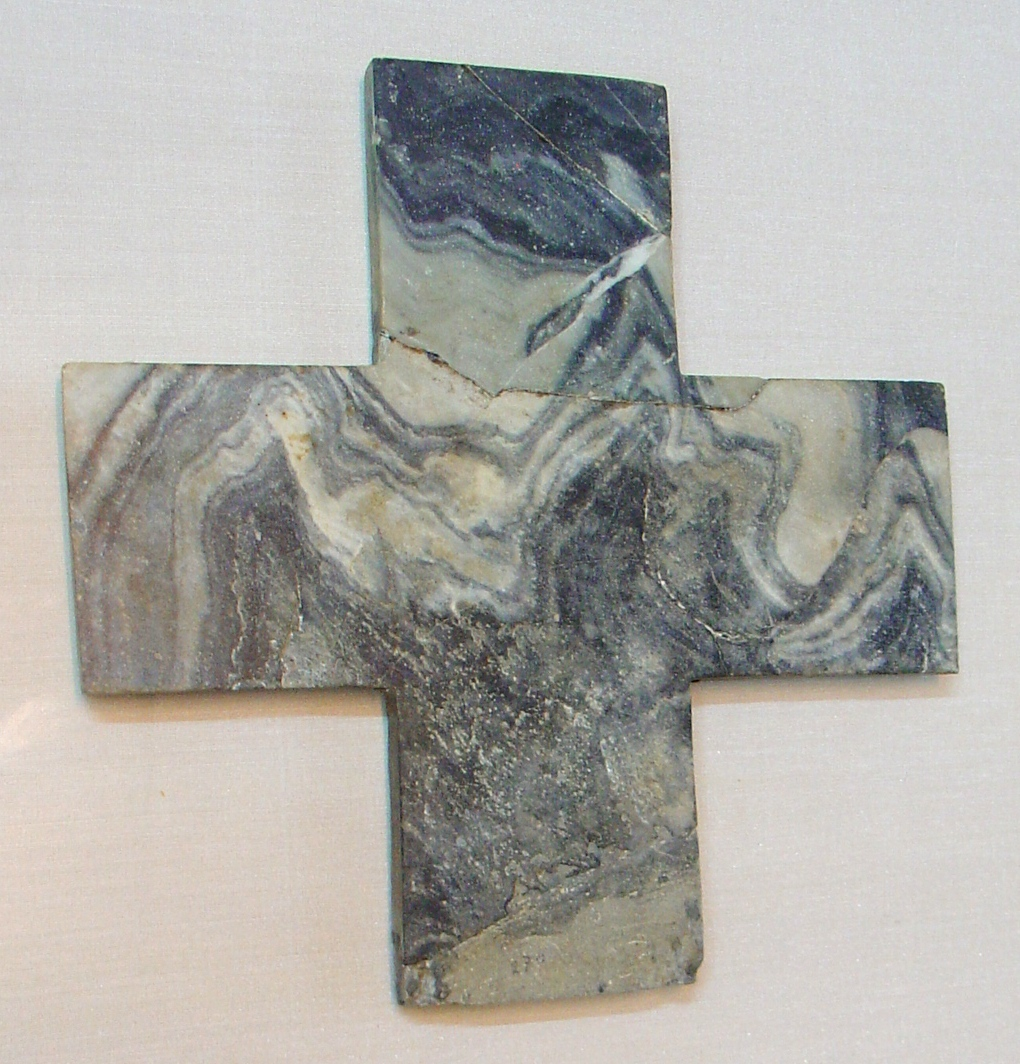
Minoan cross

An equal-armed cross (often within a circle) represents the planet Earth in traditional astrological/astronomical symbols. The cross could also be used to represent the union between male and female.

== See also ==
- Christian cross
- Christian symbols
- Swastika
