= Eugene Ziller =

American author

Eugene Ziller is an American author.

== Biography ==
Ziller was born in Brooklyn, New York, and studied at Brooklyn College and Columbia University. He did post-graduate work at Stanford University, where he worked under the distinguished teacher and short story writer Wallace Stegner. Ziller became a school teacher and later worked as supervisor of IBM operations for the Cornell University Crash Injury Research Program. His short stories have appeared in such literary periodicals as Yale Review, Kenyon Review, Perspective and others. In 1960, he published a book of short stories entitled In This World. Two of the included short stories ("The Season's Dying" and "Sparrows") won awards, the former in Best Articles and Stories and the latter in Prize Stories of 1960: The O.Henry Awards.
