= List of tallest buildings and structures in Greece =

This list ranks the tallest completed and topped out buildings and structures in Greece that stand at least 65 metres (213 ft) tall, based on standard height measurement. This includes spires and architectural details. An equal sign (=) following a rank indicates the same height between two or more buildings. The "Year" column indicates the year in which a building was completed.

Rank	Name	Location	Type	Height (m)	Height (ft)	Year built	Coordinates	Notes
1	Riviera Tower	Elliniko	Skyscraper	200 m	656 ft	2022-2026	37°52'57.99"N 23°43'36.68"E	Current tallest building in Greece
2	Athens Tower 1	Athens	Highrise	103 m	337 ft	1968-1971	37.984587°N 23.760874°E	
3	Piraeus Tower	Athens	Highrise	84 m	275 ft	1972 2023(Reconstruction)	37.94495°N 23.64403°E	
4	Atrina Center Tower	Athens	Highrise	80 m	262 ft	1977-1980	38.0374371°N 23.8014474°E	
5	Apollo Tower	Athens	Residential	80 m	262 ft	1973	37.992682°N 23.764120°E	
6	OTE Tower	Thessaloniki	Tower	76.4 m	250 ft	1965	40°37′34.47″N 22°57′16.17″E	
7	OTE Head Offices	Athens	Highrise	72 m	236 ft	1973	38.045000°N 23.804043°E	
8	DAKON Tower	Athens	Highrise	70m	230 ft	1985	37.99541° N, 23.76875° E	
9	President Hotel Athens	Athens	Highrise	68 m	223 ft	1977	37.59214°N 23.45488°E	
10	Athens Airport Control Tower	Athens	Tower	67m	223 ft	2001	37,9335778, 23,9440631	
11	Rodos Palace Hotel	Rhodes	Highrise	65m	213 ft	1974	36°25′23″N 28°11′46″E	

== Other structures ==
A mutual incomplete list of all man-made structures in Greece taller than 100 metres.

Name	Location	Type	Height (m)	Height (ft)	Year built	Coordinates	Note
Kato Souli LF Transmission Facility, Large Mast	Kato Souli	Guyed mast	250 m	820 ft	?	38°08′42.67″N 24°01′10.93″E	Radio mast of the Greek Navy
ERA-Radio mast	Athens	Guyed mast	220 m	722 ft	?	38°09′0.84″N 23°51′36.69″E	used for broadcasting on 729 kHz
Chimney of Amyntaio Power Station	Amyntaio	Chimney	200 m	656 ft	?	40°37′09.43″N 21°40′58.1″E	
Chimneys of Agios Dimitrios Power Station	Agios Dimitrios	Chimney	200 m	656 ft	?	40°23′41.11″N 21°55′25.98″E ; 40°23′39.82″N 21°55′28.84″E ; 40°23′37.35″N 21°55′34.24″E	3 chimneys
Chimneys of Kardia Power Station	Pontokomi	Chimney	200 m	656 ft	?	40°24′41.21″N 21°47′08.02″E ; 40°24′38.96″N 21°47′09.22″E ; 40°24′36.75″N 21°47′10.47″E ; 40°24′34.46″N 21°47′11.71″E	4 chimneys
Chimney of Megalopoli B Power Station	Kato Karyes	Chimney	200 m	656 ft	?	37°24′55.36″N 22°03′57.03″E	
Pournari Dam	Árta	Dam	185 m	607 ft	1998	39°11′4.13″N 21°01′34.33″E	
Chimney 3 of Megalopoli A Power Station	Megalopoli	Chimney	180 m	591 ft	?	37°25′2.27″N 22°06′27.91″E	
Thisavros Dam	Nikiforos	Dam	172 m	564 ft	1996	41°21′15.76″N 24°21′58.51″E	
Sykia Dam	Sykia	Dam	170 m	558 ft		39°18′47.79″N 21°24′47.54″E	on-hold
Cooling Tower of New Ptolemaida V Power Station (Under construction)	Ptolemaida	Cooling Tower	170 m	427 ft	2017	40°29′28.6″N 21°46′23.8″E	
Kremasta Dam	Kremasta Sykias	Dam	165 m	541 ft	1965	38°53′14.54″N 21°29′43.64″E	
Rio-Antirrio bridge	Antirrio	Bridge pylon	165 m	541 ft	1998-2004	38°19′22.4″N 21°46′18.37″E ; 38°19′5.64″N 21°46′27.72″E	
Chimney of Agios Georgios Power Station	Keratsini	Chimney	158 m	518 ft	?	37°57′14.27″N 23°36′37.37″E	
Chimney of Larco Larymna	Larymna	Chimney	157 m	515 ft	?	38°33′51.15″N 23°17′35.53″E	
Chimneys of Lavrio Power Station	Lavrio	Chimney	150 m	492 ft	?	37°44′45.07″N 24°3′59.06″E ; 37°44′44.67″N 24°4′2.42″E	
Chimney of Ptolemaida Power Station	Ptolemaida	Chimney	150 m	492 ft	1959	40°28′51.21″N 21°43′36.81″E	
Pygros Radio Mast	Megara	Guyed mast	150 m	492 ft	?	37°58′15.63″N 23°25′10.48″E	used for broadcasting on 666 kHz and 981 kHz
Mesochóra Dam	Mesochóra	Dam	150 m	492 ft	2001	39°27′52.73″N 21°18′16.23″E	unused
Kerkyra Mediumwave Transmitter	Kerkyra	Guyed mast	149 m	489 ft	?	39°36′27.1″N 19°54′2.29″E ; 39°36′25.14″N 19°54′4.07″E	used for broadcasting on 1008 kHz
Rio-Antirrio bridge	Antirrio	Bridge pylon	142.6 m	468 ft	1998-2004	38°19′38.85″N 21°46′9.65″E ; 38°18′48.73″N 21°46′37.1″E	
Chimney of ELFE-Fertilizer factory	Keratsini	Chimney	132 m	433 ft		37°56′38.17″N 23°36′59.02″E	Chimney with water tank
Cooling tower of Florina Power Station	Meliti	Chimney	130 m	427 ft	2000	40°48′44.01″N 21°36′9.93″E	
Agia Paraskevi transmitter	Athens	Tower?	130 m	427 ft	?	38°01′00″N 23°50′50″E	
Kato Souli LF Transmission Facility, Small Mast	Kato Souli	Guyed mast	129 m	423 ft	?	38°08′58.45″N 24°01′23.5″E	Radio mast of the Greek Navy
Chania Souda Naval Transmitter	Kokkino Chorio	Guyed mast	127 m	417 ft	?	35°28′9.63″N 24°14′24.62″E	
Chimney of Atherinolakkos Power Station	Atherinolakkos	Chimney	125 m	410 ft	2002-2004	35°0′12.32″N 26°8′23.16″E	
Kavala VoA-Shortwave Transmitter	Dasochori	Tower	125 m	410 ft	?	40°52′54.38″N 24°49′35.88″E	Towers of a shortwave transmitter used by Voice of America
Zákinthos Mediumwave Transmitter	Zákinthos	Guyed mast	125 m	410 ft	?	37°45′9.22″N 20°51′43.65″E ; 37°45′10.44″N 20°51′40.73″E	used for broadcasting on 927 kHz
Asprochomata Viotias Wind Turbines	Asprochomata Viotias	Wind Turbine	125 m	410 ft	?	38°27′03.82″N 22°43′26.24″E ; 38°26′59.72″N 22°43′28.01″E ; 38°26′55.62″N 22°43′26.72″E ; 38°27′21.17″N 22°43′10.47″E ; 38°27′14.02″N 22°43′12.74″E ; 38°27′19.35″N 22°43′19.35″E ; 38°26′48.24″N 22°43′27.88″E	
Imerovigli Kefallonias Wind Turbines	Imerovigli Kefallonias	Wind Turbine	125 m	410 ft	?	38°18′36.48″N 20°31′11.94″E ; 38°18′32.99″N 20°31′01.48″E ; 38°18′25.15″N 20°30′57.37″E ; 38°18′20.32″N 20°30′48.71″E ; 38°17′58.86″N 20°30′24.80″E ; 38°17′50.70″N 20°30′18.86″E : 38°17′43.72″N 20°30′14.17″E ; 38°17′33.21″N 20°30′07.52″E ; 38°17′19.51″N 20°29′57.35″E ; 38°17′15.09″N 20°29′47.20″E	
Kaliva Viotias Wind Turbines	Kaliva Viotias	Wind Turbine	125 m	410 ft	?	38°20′10.76″N 22°52′24.02″E ; 38°20′06.01″N 22°52′29.66″E ; 38°20′01.92″N 22°52′35.32″E ; 38°20′00.63″N 22°52′09.15″E	
Krekeza Viotias Wind Turbines	Krekeza Viotias	Wind Turbine	125 m	410 ft	?	38°09′44.20″N 23°34′31.12″E ; 38°09′43.25″N 23°34′40.29″E ; 38°09′37.49″N 23°34′49.26″E ; 38°09′32.48″N 23°34′55.82″E ; 38°09′28.14″N 23°35′04.59″E ; 38°09′28.62″N 23°35′13.80″E ; 38°09′30.19″N 23°35′23.42″E ; 38°09′33.51″N 23°35′32.27″E ; 38°09′36.86″N 23°35′40.64″E ; 38°09′40.10″N 23°35′49.46″E ; 38°09′44.31″N 23°35′57.67″E ; 38°09′46.39″N 23°36′06.98″E	
Malavria Argolidas Wind Turbines	Malavria Argolidas	Wind Turbine	125 m	410 ft	?	37°29′26.10″N 23°10′18.30″E 37°29′27.26″N 23°10′07.99″E ; 37°29′30.46″N 23°10′01.03″E ; 37°29′33.95″N 23°09′49.55″E ; 37°29′35.36″N 23°09′38.21″E ; 37°29′05.18″N 23°09′23.97″E ; 37°28′43.60″N 23°07′58.38″E ; 37°28′43.72″N 23°07′49.14″E ; 37°28′44.69″N 23°07′39.28″E ; 37°28′47.34″N 23°07′29.60″E ; 37°28′49.10″N 23°07′17.16″E ; 37°28′49.81″N 23°07′03.59″E	
Perdikovouni Viotias Wind Turbines	Perdikovouni Viotias	Wind Turbine	125 m	410 ft	?	38°20′37.14″N 22°56′28.23″E ; 38°20′34.02″N 22°56′49.41″E ; 38°19′19.04″N 22°54′51.47″E ; 38°19′13.47″N 22°55′10.25″E ; 38°19′11.78″N 22°55′20.12″E ; 38°19′01.15″N 22°55′49.19″E ; 38°18′59.28″N 22°56′01.94″E ; 38°18′54.88″N 22°56′13.95″E	
Profitis Ilias Argolidas Wind Turbines	Profitis Ilias Argolidas	Wind Turbine	125 m	410 ft	?	37°32′28.14″N 22°35′42.39″E ; 37°32′19.76″N 22°35′42.26″E ; 37°32′13.95″N 22°35′47.13″E ; 37°32′05.64″N 22°35′47.17″E ; 37°32′00.67″N 22°35′52.23″E ; 37°32′55.60″N 22°35′59.62″E ; 37°31′50.76″N 22°36′06.96″E ; 37°31′44.86″N 22°36′12.65″E ; 37°31′37.62″N 22°36′15.19″E ; 37°31′32.77″N 22°36′22.37″E ; 37°32′42.70″N 22°34′58.84″E ; 37°32′40.24″N 22°35′09.72″E ; 37°32′34.91″N 22°35′22.90″E ; 37°31′24.70″N 22°36′40.28″E	
Skopies Viotias Wind Turbines	Skopies Viotias	Wind Turbine	125 m	410 ft	?	38°26′56.23″N 22°43′55.75″E ; 38°26′50.06″N 22°43′58.09″E ; 38°26′40.43″N 22°43′59.12″E ; 38°26′25.26″N 22°43′54.44″E ; 38°26′29.56″N 22°44′34.66″E ; 38°26′35.54″N 22°44′27.05″E	
Trikorfo Fokidas Wind Turbines	Trikorfo Fokidas	Wind Turbine	125 m	410 ft	?	38°26′02.34″N 22°02′39.47″E ; 38°25′55.00″N 22°02′37.19″E ; 38°25′45.82″N 22°02′37.07″E ; 38°25′39.12″N 22°02′32.09″E ; 38°25′33.27″N 22°02′25.82″E ; 38°25′26.46″N 22°02′22.13″E, 38°25′18.99″N 22°02′21.67″E	
Málgara Transmitter	Málgara	Guyed mast	121 m	397 ft	?	40°31′55.66″N 22°41′30.32″E	used for broadcasting on 1179 kHz
Chimney 1 of Megalopoli A Power Station	Megalopoli	Chimney	120 m	394 ft	1990-1992	37°25′4.47″N 22°6′28.51″E	
Rotary kiln of Titan Cement Factory	Thessaloniki	Kiln	120 m	394 ft	?	40°41′59.4″N 22°57′6.6″E	
Kavala VoA-Mediumwave Transmitter	Dasochori	Guyed mast	118 m	387 ft	?	40°53′23.96″N 24°50′53.05″E ; 40°53′25.99″N 24°50′57.76″E ; 40°53′22.44″N 24°51′0.43″E ; 40°53′20.41″N 24°50′55.74″E	Masts of a mediumwave transmitter used by Voice of America
Chimneys of Aliveri Power Station	Aliveri	Chimney	114 m	374 ft	?	38°23′23.73″N 24°03′06.1″E ; 38°23′22.16″N 24°03′05.19″E	
Manoliása TV Tower	Manoliása	Lattice tower	115.8 m	380 ft	?	39°31′56.83″N 20°50′38.81″E	
Kavala VoA-Shortwave Transmitter	Dasochori	Tower	114 m	374 ft	?	40°53′29.87″N 24°49′6.95″E ; 40°53′22.34″N 24°49′21.15″E ; 40°52′54.07″N 24°49′16.34″E ; 40°52′46.56″N 24°49′33.43″E	Towers of a shortwave transmitter used by Voice of America
Florina Power Station Boiler House	Meliti	Building	113 m	371 ft	?	40°48′42.16″N 21°36′2.84″E	
Komotini Mediumwave Transmitter	Komotini	Guyed mast	112.8 m	370 ft	?	41°05′54.01″N 25°24′25.21″E	used for broadcasting on 1404 kHz
Spata Radio Mast	Spata	Guyed Mast	110 m	361 ft	?	37°58′26″N 23°55′37″E	
Cooling towers of Amyntaio Power Station	Amyntaio	Chimney	109 m	358 ft	?	40°37′12″N 21°40′51″E ; 40°37′8.29″N 21°40′48.91″E	
Parnitha Telecommunication Tower	Thrakomakedones	Tower	108 m	354 ft	?	38°10′20.87″N 23°43′46.04″E	
Megalopoli B Power Station Cooling Tower	Kato Karyes	Chimney	107 m	351 ft	?	37°24′56.88″N 22°03′53.43″E	
Louzes Nafpaktou Wind Turbines	Louzes Nafpaktou	Wind Turbine	107 m	351 ft	?	38°27′05.74″N 21°46′55.65″E ; 38°27′02.86″N 21°47′03.04″E ; 38°26′58.93″N 21°47′09.27″E ; 38°26′54.93″N 21°47′16.40″E ; 38°26′49.36″N 21°47′21.56″E ; 38°26′43.91″N 21°47′25.62″E ; 38°26′37.43″N 21°47′28.82″E ; 38°26′32.29″N 21°47′30.92″E ; 38°26′12.55″N 21°47′34.07″E ; 38°26′07.61″N 21°47′38.63″E ; 38°26′05.35″N 21°48′01.80″E ; 38°26′00.72″N 21°48′05.39″E	
Diagoras Power Station Chimney	Diagoras	Chimney	105 m	344 ft	?	36°22′44.23″N 28°01′6.53″E	
Large cooling tower of Agios Dimitrios Power Station	Agios Dimitrios	Chimney	104 m	341 ft	?	40°23′47″N 21°55′26.13″E	
Athens Tower 1	Athens	Highrise	103 m	338 ft	1968-1971	37°59′46.6″N 23°45′38.53″E	
Agios Marina Radio Mast	Agios Marina	Guyed mast	100 m	328 ft	?	37°46′3.82″N 24°03′43.73″E	
Agriokerasia Arkadias Wind Turbines	Agriokerasia Arkadias	Wind Turbine	100 m	328 ft	?	37°22′51.43″N 22°22′13.01″E ; 37°22′58.67″N 22°22′13.50″E ; 37°23′04.86″N 22°22′11.01″E ; 37°23′10.83″N 22°22′05.72″E ; 37°23′15.78″N 22°22′00.16″E	
Ano Splitharia Arkadias Wind Turbines	Ano Splitharia Arkadias	Wind Turbine	100 m	328 ft	?	37°22′29.34″N 22°20′58.93″E ; 37°22′35.54″N 22°20′58.79″E ; 37°22′40.62″N 22°20′57.70″E ; 37°22′44.47″N 22°20′52.70″E ; 37°22′48.98″N 22°20′47.72″E ; 37°22′55.33″N 22°20′45.30″E ; 37°23′00.29″N 22°20′42.06″E ; 37°23′04.60″N 22°20′37.50″E ; 37°23′07.86″N 22°20′31.24″E	
Asprovouni Arkadias Wind Turbines	Asprovouni Arkadias	Wind Turbine	100 m	328 ft	?	37°22′26.48″N 22°21′20.00″E ; 37°22′32.38″N 22°21′12.30″E ; 37°23′32.38″N 22°21′11.17″E ; 37°23′44.00″N 22°21′08.15″E ; 37°23′55.65″N 22°21′06.02″E ; 37°23′59.25″N 22°21′01.02″E	
Didymos Lofos Evrou Wind Turbines	Didymos Lofos Evrou	Wind Turbine	100 m	328 ft	?	41°09′38.15″N 25°54′05.67″E ; 41°09′30.03″N 25°54′09.80″E ; 41°09′23.27″N 25°54′16.06″E ; 41°09′19.41″N 25°54′24.02″E ; 41°09′17.99″N 25°54′32.82″E ; 41°09′18.80″N 25°54′45.12″E ; 41°09′18.15″N 25°54′55.11″E ; 41°09′17.30″N 25°55′04.74″E ; 41°09′57.14″N 25°55′42.02″E ; 41°09′55.84″N 25°55′57.84″E ; 41°10′07.48″N 25°56′18.94″E ; 41°10′23.57″N 25°56′26.68″E ; 41°09′49.79″N 25°56′35.71″E	
Kefali Evrou Wind Turbines	Kefali Evrou	Wind Turbine	100 m	328 ft	?	41°05′36.56″N 25°54′17.75″E ; 41°05′33.75″N 25°54′26.09″E ; 41°05′37.51″N 25°54′39.34″E ; 41°05′35.20″N 25°54′49.28″E ; 41°05′29.67″N 25°55′01.91″E ; 41°05′37.35″N 25°55′14.60″E ; 41°05′41.54″N 25°55′25.73″E ; 41°05′39.65″N 25°55′31.11″E ; 41°05′36.90″N 25°55′39.67″E ; 41°05′35.33″N 25°55′45.68″E ; 41°05′33.69″N 25°55′53.51″E ; 41°05′33.17″N 25°56′21.45″E ; 41°05′34.10″N 25°56′30.29″E ; 41°05′54.51″N 25°56′49.16″E ; 41°06′01.90″N 25°56′59.33″E ; 41°06′15.47″N 25°57′15.24″E	

== Proposed and under construction ==
Rank	Name	City	Height (m)	Status	Completion
1	Hard Rock Hotel & Casino Athens	Athens	197 m	Under Construction	2027
2	Vouliagmenis Mixed-Use Tower	Athens	160 m	Approved	-
3	Kerameia Allatini Tower	Thessaloniki	100 m	Approved	-
4	Hellinikon Office Tower	Athens	-	Proposed	-
5	Hellinikon Promenade Residential Tower	Athens	-	Proposed	-
