= List of tallest buildings in Athens =

In Athens, up until 2022, buildings were not allowed to surpass 12 floors so as not to block the view toward the Parthenon. Specifically up until 1968 the maximum allowed height of a building was 35 meters, but from 1985 until 2022 it was 27 meters. There were several exceptions though, such as the Athens Towers, the Atrina center, and the OTE central building, all of which exceed that level. This is due to their either being built far away from the centre, or to the fact that they were constructed during periods of political instability. The city's tallest structure is the Athens Tower, reaching 103m and comprising 28 floors. The law changed in 2022, with the approval of three tall towers at Ellinikon which will reach close to 200 metres upon completion in 2027.

The list includes buildings above 65 m (213 ft) in Athens area:

Rank	Name	Image	Height m (ft)	Floors	Year	Use	Location district suburb
1	Riviera Tower		200m (656ft)	50	Expected: 2027	Residential	Ellinikon
2	Hard Rock Hotel/Casino Athens		195m (640ft)	42	Expected: 2027	Hotel, Casino and Venue	Ellinikon
3	Athens Tower 1		103 m (338 ft)	28	1971	Office	Ampelokipoi
4	Piraeus Tower		84 m (276 ft)	22	Built: 1972 Reconstructed: 2024	Office	Piraeus
5	Apollo Tower		80 m (262 ft)	25	1973	Residential	Ampelokipoi
6	Atrina Center		80 m (262 ft)	20	1980	Office	Marousi
7	TelekomGR (ex. OTE) Headquarters		72 m (236 ft)	18	1979	Office	Marousi
8	President Hotel Athens		68 m (223 ft)	22	1978	Hotel	Ampelokipoi
9	Athens Tower 2		65 m (213 ft)	15	1971	Office	Ampelokipoi
10	Conrad Athens		65 m (213 ft)	15	1963	Hotel	Evangelismos

== See also ==
- List of tallest buildings and structures in Greece

== Sources and external links ==
- Report for Athens at Emporis
- Report for Athens at SkyscraperPage
- Report for Athens at Structurae
