= Amyntaio Power Plant =

Coal-fired power station in Greece

Amyntaio Power Station
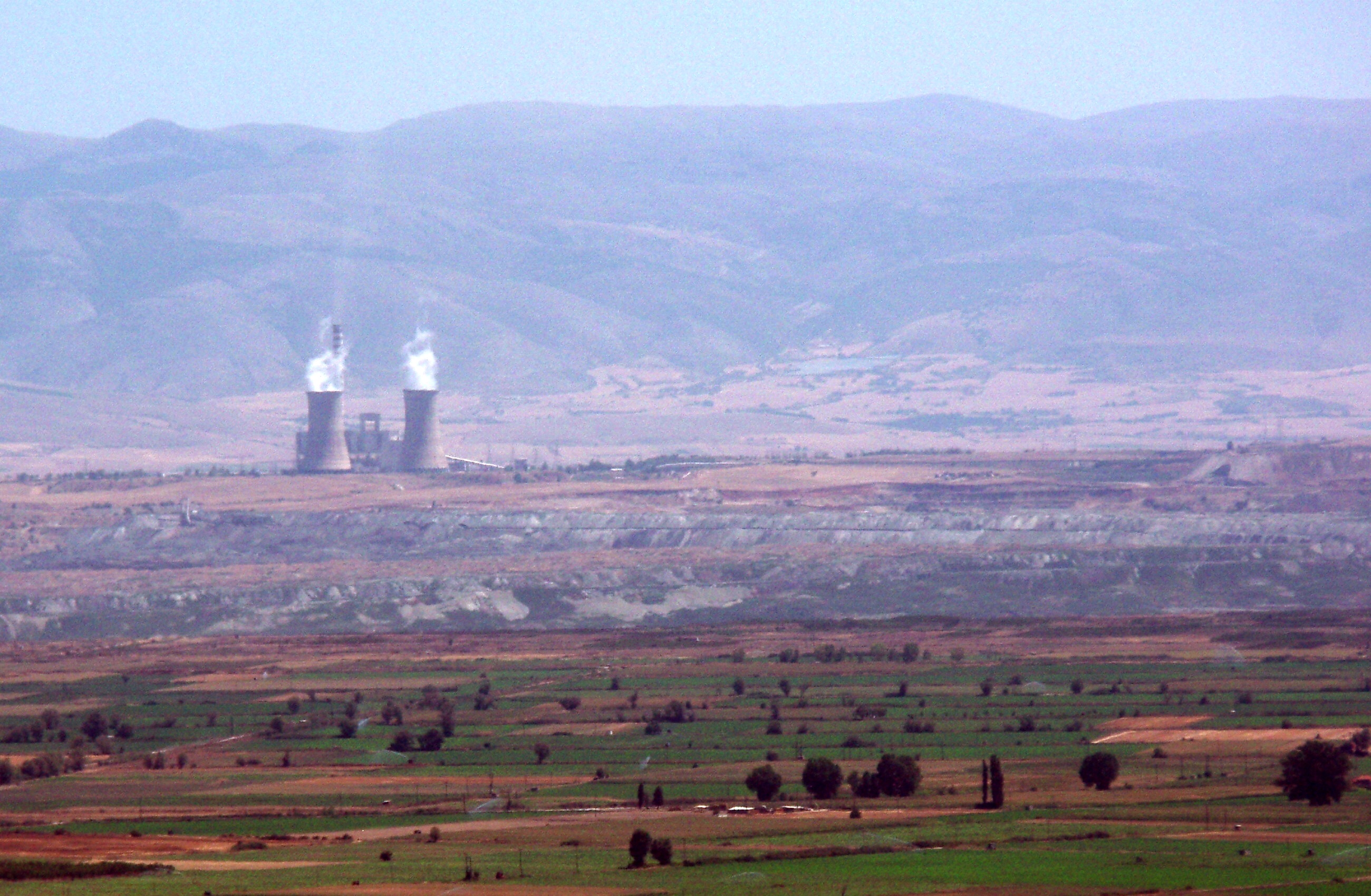
- Official name: ΑΗΣ Αμυνταίου
- Country: Greece
- Location: Amyntaio, Western Macedonia
- Coordinates: 40°37′8″N 21°41′2″E
- Status: Operational
- Construction began: 1983
- Commission date: 1987
- Owner: Public Power Corporation (PPC)
- Operator: Public Power Corporation

Thermal power station
- Primary fuel: Lignite
- Site elevation: 660 m (2,165 ft)
- Cooling source: Polyfytos Lake
- Cogeneration?: Yes

Power generation
- Units operational: 2 x 300 MW
- Make and model: Turbo generator by LMZ; Sulzer boiler by Stein Industrie
- Nameplate capacity: 600 MW

Amyntaio Power Station (Greek: ΑΗΣ Αμυνταίου) is a 600 MW coal-fired power station near Amyntaio in Western Macedonia, Greece. Build and commissioned in the mid 1980s, the power station is fuelled by lignite from the adjacent Amyntaio coal mine.

Today it is one of six power plants in an area called the Western Macedonia Lignite Center, which is located in the Ptolemaida Basin and constitutes the largest coalfield in Greece and the Balkans. Both the power plant and the adjacent mine are owned by the Public Power Corporation (PPC).

== Construction ==
The power station was constructed between 1983 and 1986 by a consortium of French Alsthom-Atlantique and Stein Industries, Russian Energomachexport and Zarubezhenergoproekt and Greek Biokat.

It consists of two units with a generation capacity of 300 MW each. Turbo generators are built by Russian LMZ, while Sulzer boilers are supplied by French Stein Industrie. The plant's 200 metres (660 ft) tall chimney is one of the tallest structures in Greece.

The lignite fuel is dug out by several bucket-wheel excavators and transported by belt conveyors from the adjacent open-pit Amyntaio coal mine. Feedwater is transported from the nearby Lake Vegoritida and the artificial Lake Polyfytos, some 50 km south of the plant.

A 50 MW / 200 MWh battery energy storage system started construction in 2025.

== Operation ==
The power plant's first unit has been in operation since January 1987 with the second unit following in August 1987. Its lifespan is limited by the remaining exploitable deposits in the Amyntaio mine. As PPC requested article 33 Limited lifetime derogation status for its Amyntaio and Kardia plants, excluding them from compliance with stricter emission limits set by the EU directive 2010/75, they are expected to be shut down by the end of 2023.

In 2013, the Greek government included the Amyntaio power plant in a list of assets which PPC was required to spin-off to a subsidiary. This subsidiary was set to be turned into a new competing electricity company following its privatization. Following large scale protests and limited corporate interest in entering the Greek lignite market, the new Syriza-led government however announced it would call off the privatization.

=== Cogeneration of heat and power ===
The power station is equipped to make productive use of waste heat, supplying the nearby town of Amyntaio and the villages of Filotas and Levea with co-generated district heat. Connecting to the power stations steam pipelines, the municipal District Heating Company of Amyndeo operates an extensive network connecting 1250 public and residential buildings.

Originally constructed in 2005, the district heating network is currently being expanded by a planned 50% to cover a larger share of the three villages' heating requirements. Accordingly, the equipment is being upgraded to allow for thermal loads up to 34 MW_{th}.

The Amyntaio district heating project is the third project of its kind in Greece following similar projects in Kozani and Ptolemaida. It has become a model project in transnational cooperation with the neighbouring North Macedonia.

== Environment ==
In spite of investments in heat cogeneration, overall efficiency of the power station remains relatively low, significantly contributing to the country's carbon dioxide emissions. At the same time, air pollution by respirable suspended particles and soil acidification by NOx emissions remains high, in spite of moderate investments in filtering technology. Since 2001, NOx emissions of the Amyntaio power plant even significantly increased, reaching 2.5 kg/MWh in 2008, the highest value of all power plants in Greece. This is explained by the low and further decreasing calorific value of the low-quality lignite of the Amyntaio coal mine, which however has been found low in sulfur and mercury.

After a pollutant emissions reduction plan as required by EU directive 2001/80 has been approved, the environmental permits of Amyntaio were renewed in 2008. With its lifetime being limited to 2023, the Amyntaio power plant however remains excluded from compliance with the stricter emission limits set by the EU directive 2010/75. Subsequently, neither the implementation of desulphurisation technology nor the replacement of electrostatic precipitators to reduce particle emissions is planned for this power plant, though preliminary studies have been completed.

=== Emission data ===
Greenhouse gas emissions as verified by the EU Emission Trading Scheme (in tCO_{2}e)
2008	2009	2010	2011	2012	2013	2014
5,256,992	4,396,383	4,609,479	5,056,625	5,016,496	4,197,293	4,095,373
Data: European Commission, 2015

== See also ==
- List of power stations in Greece
- Energy in Greece
