= Pontokomi =

Pontokomi Ποντοκώμη
- Community
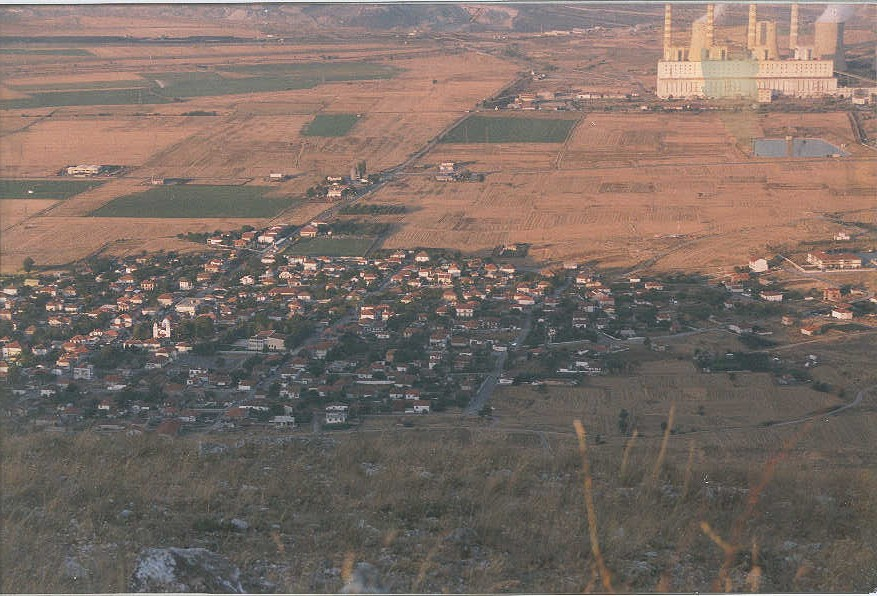

- Location within Greece
- Coordinates: 40°25′N 21°46′E
- Country: Greece
- Administrative region: West Macedonia
- Regional unit: Kozani
- Municipality: Kozani
- Municipal unit: Dimitrios Ypsilantis
- Elevation: 710 m (2,330 ft)

Population (2021)
  - Community: 594
- Time zone: UTC+2 (EET)
  - Summer (DST): UTC+3 (EEST)
- Postal code: 50200
- Area code: 24610

Pontokomi (Greek: Ποντοκώμη) is a village located in the central part of Kozani regional unit, West Macedonia region, Greece. It is part of the municipal unit Dimitrios Ypsilantis. It is situated between the cities of Ptolemaida and Kozani (14 km (8.7 mi) distance from each).

It is a refugee town, developed as a modern and organised village with a complete market and services. A new amphitheatre opened 15 July 2001 which was constructed at the foot of the mountain and shaped by former quarries. On 20 June 2002, it was named Amphitheatre Mikis Theodorakis.

Pontokomi is notable in later Greek history including the participation of the majority of residents in the resistance during World War, and also in marching against dictatorship.

The main industry is agriculture (cereals and tobacco) and some residents work in the power stations.
