= Megaro Mousikis metro station =

Athens Metro station

Μέγαρο Μουσικής Megaro Moussikis
- Station platforms

General information
- Location: Athens Concert Hall; Athens; Greece
- Coordinates: 37°58′43″N 23°45′09″E
- Manager: STASY
- Line: Athens Metro Line 3
- Platforms: 2
- Tracks: 2

Construction
- Structure type: Underground
- Accessible: Yes

Key dates
- 28 January 2000: Opened

Services
Preceding station	Athens Metro	Following station
Evangelismos towards Dimotiko Theatro	Line 3	Ambelokipi towards Athens Airport
Location

Megaro Mousikis (Greek: Μέγαρο Μουσικής, lit. 'Concert Hall'), also known as Megaro Moussikis on signage, is a station on the Athens Metro, located just outside the Athens Concert Hall on Vassilissis Sophias Ave. The U.S. Embassy, as well as the hospitals "Alexandra", "Areteion", "NIMITS" and "Eginition", are close to the station.

== Station layout ==
G
Street level
Exits
B1
Concourse
- Customer Service
- Tickets
B2
Side platform, doors will open on the right
Platform 1
← to Dimotiko Theatro (Evangelismos)
Platform 2
to Athens Airport (Ambelokipi) →
Side platform, doors will open on the right

== Cultural works ==
- Panagiotis Fidakis's Bambouzina, consisting of birds perching on a staff, is at the ticket hall level.
