= Piraeus Tower =

Skyscraper in Piraeus, Greece

Piraeus Tower after reconstruction in Piraeus

The Piraeus Tower or Piraeus Merchant Shipping Center is an 84 meter high building located in Piraeus. It was the second tallest building in Greece, before the Riviera Tower and the Hard Rock Hotel/Casino Athens building was constructed. The construction of the building began in 1972 according to plans by Ioannis Vikelas, Demosthenes Molfesis and Alexandros Loizos. The frame of the building was completed in 1974 and in 1983 it was clad externally with glass and metal sheets. Only the three lower floors of the building were utilized and the rest was left empty. In 2021, the reconstruction of the tower began, which was completed in 2023. The tower was officially opened on 4 June 2024. It has 24 floors and two basements, with a total built-up area of 34,623 square meters.

== See also ==
- List of tallest buildings in Athens
- Athens Towers
- Riviera Tower
