= Evangelismos metro station =

Athens Metro station

Ευαγγελισμός Evangelismos
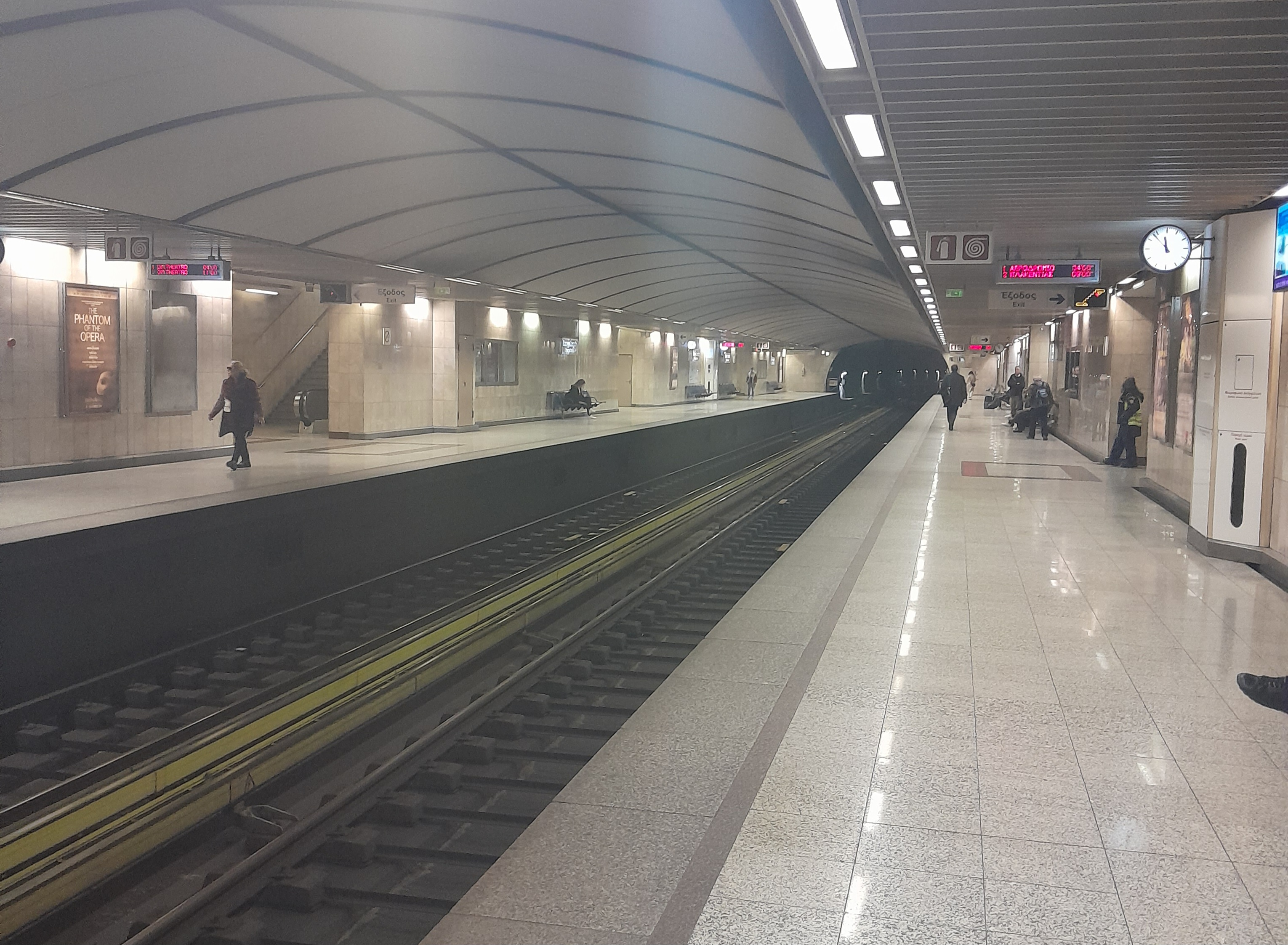
- Station platforms

General information
- Location: Evangelismos; Athens; Greece
- Coordinates: 37.9763°N 23.7470°E
- Manager: STASY
- Line: Athens Metro Line 3
- Platforms: 2
- Tracks: 2

Construction
- Structure type: Underground
- Accessible: Yes

Key dates
- 28 January 2000: Opened

Services
| Preceding station | Athens Metro | Following station |
|---|---|---|
| Syntagma towards Dimotiko Theatro | Line 3 | Megaro Mousikis towards Athens Airport |
Future Service
| Kolonaki towards Alsos Veikou | Line 4 | Kaisariani towards Goudi |
Location

Evangelismos (Greek: Ευαγγελισμός, lit. 'Annunciation') is a metro station located on Vasilissis Sofias Avenue. It is in Evangelismos area, close to Evangelismos Hospital, the National Gallery of Athens, the Gennadius Library, the Athens War Museum, the Byzantine & Christian Museum and the Athens Hilton. The station serves both Kolonaki and Pangrati neighbourhoods, known for their cultural hubs, shopping centers and cafes. Furthermore, many embassies and companies are located within close proximity.

This station was inaugurated in 2000 as part of the original Athens Metro section.

== History ==
The station first appeared in the original 1979 plan as part of Line B (which is essentially the current Line 3) with the name Ilisia. It appeared as Evangelismos in the plan that was funded in 1991 and opened in 28 January 2000 along with the first section of the system. In 2019 there was a proposal for the station to change its name to Pavlos Bakoyiannis. This proposal was later dropped after facing strong opposition. (Pavlos Bakoyiannis was the brother-in-law of the then newly-elected prime minister Kyriakos Mitsotakis).

== Entrances ==
The station has two entrances. One on Vassilissis Sofias Avenue, near Marasli Street in front of Evangelismos Hospital, and one in the middle of Rizari Park. The second entrance is linked with Vassilissis Sofias Ave. via stairway. Only the entrance at Rizari Park is ADA accessible.

== Station layout ==
Sections with an asterisk (*) are under construction.

G
Street level
Exits
B1
Vasilissis Sofias concourse
- Customer Service
- Tickets
B2
Rizari concourse*
- Customer Service
- Tickets
Side platform, doors will open on the right
Platform 1
← to Dimotiko Theatro (Syntagma)
Platform 2
to Athens Airport (Megaro Mousikis) →
Side platform, doors will open on the right
B3
Transfer*
B4
Side platform, doors will open on the right
Platform*
← to Alsos Veikou (Kolonaki)
Platform*
to Goudi (Kaisariani) →
Side platform, doors will open on the right

== Art works ==
- Chryssa's abstract sculpture, Mott Street, is at the concourse level.

== Gallery ==
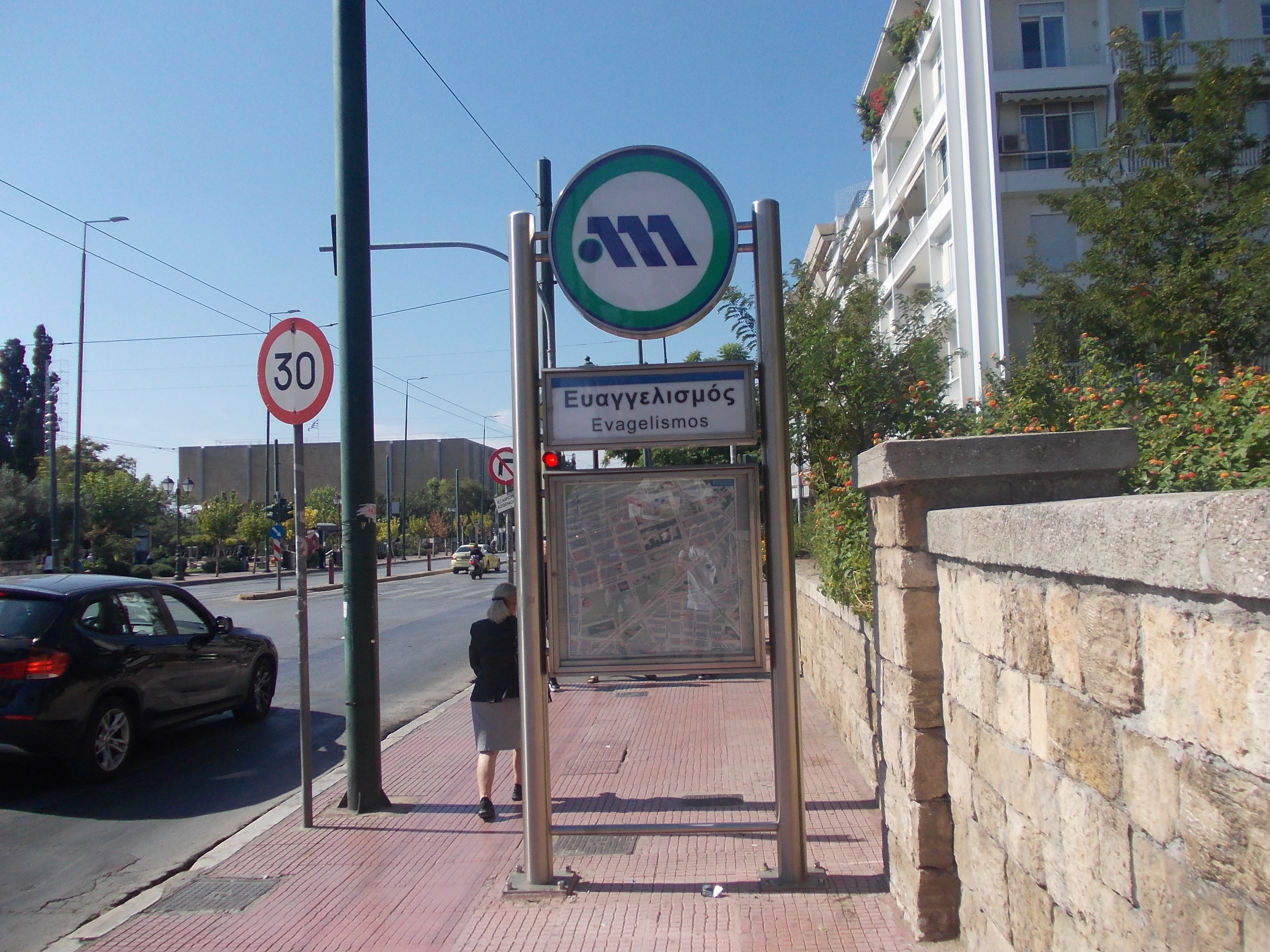
Sign on Vassilissis Sofias Avenue

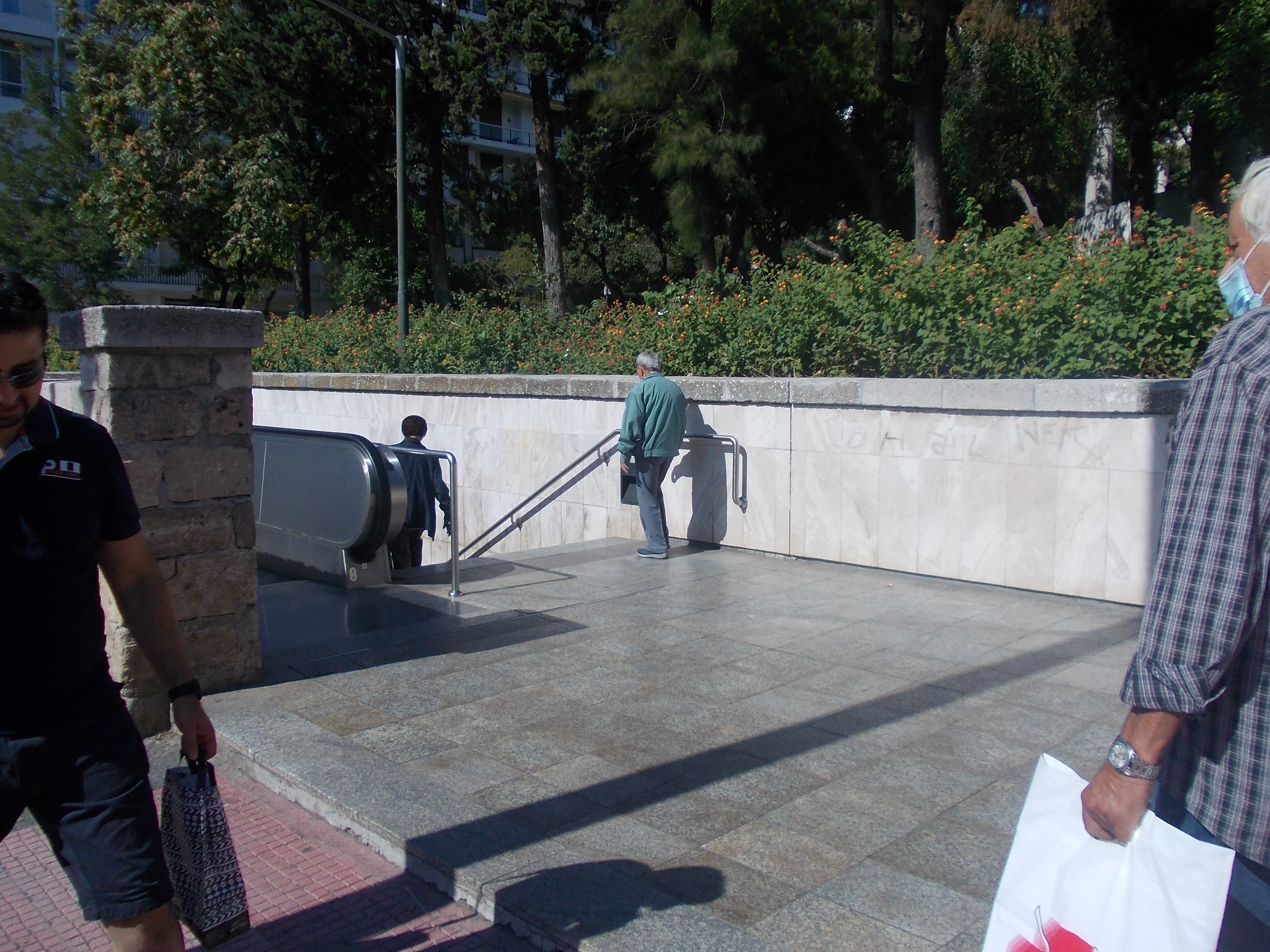
Entrance at Vassilissis Sofias Avenue

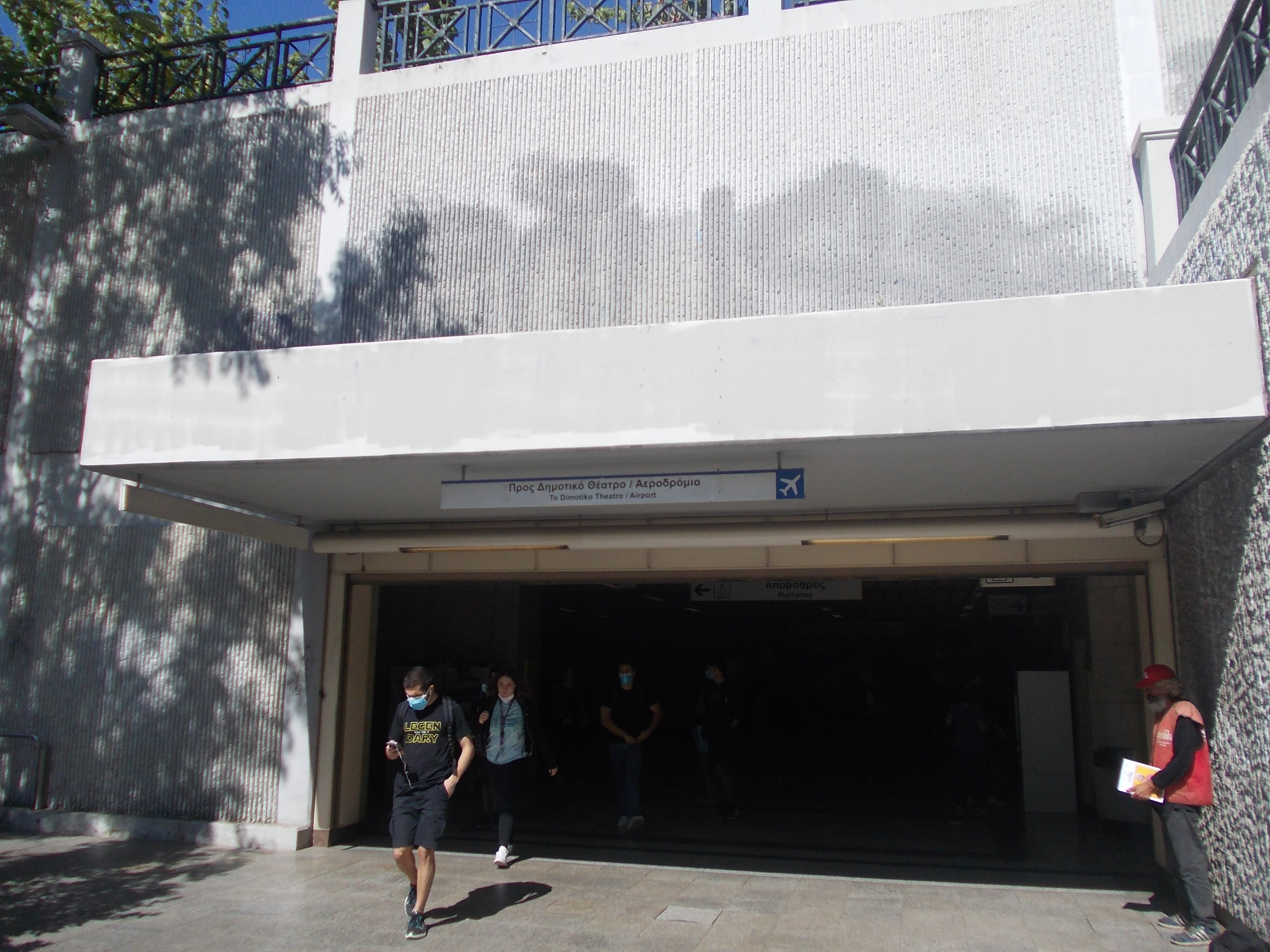
Entrance at Rizari Park

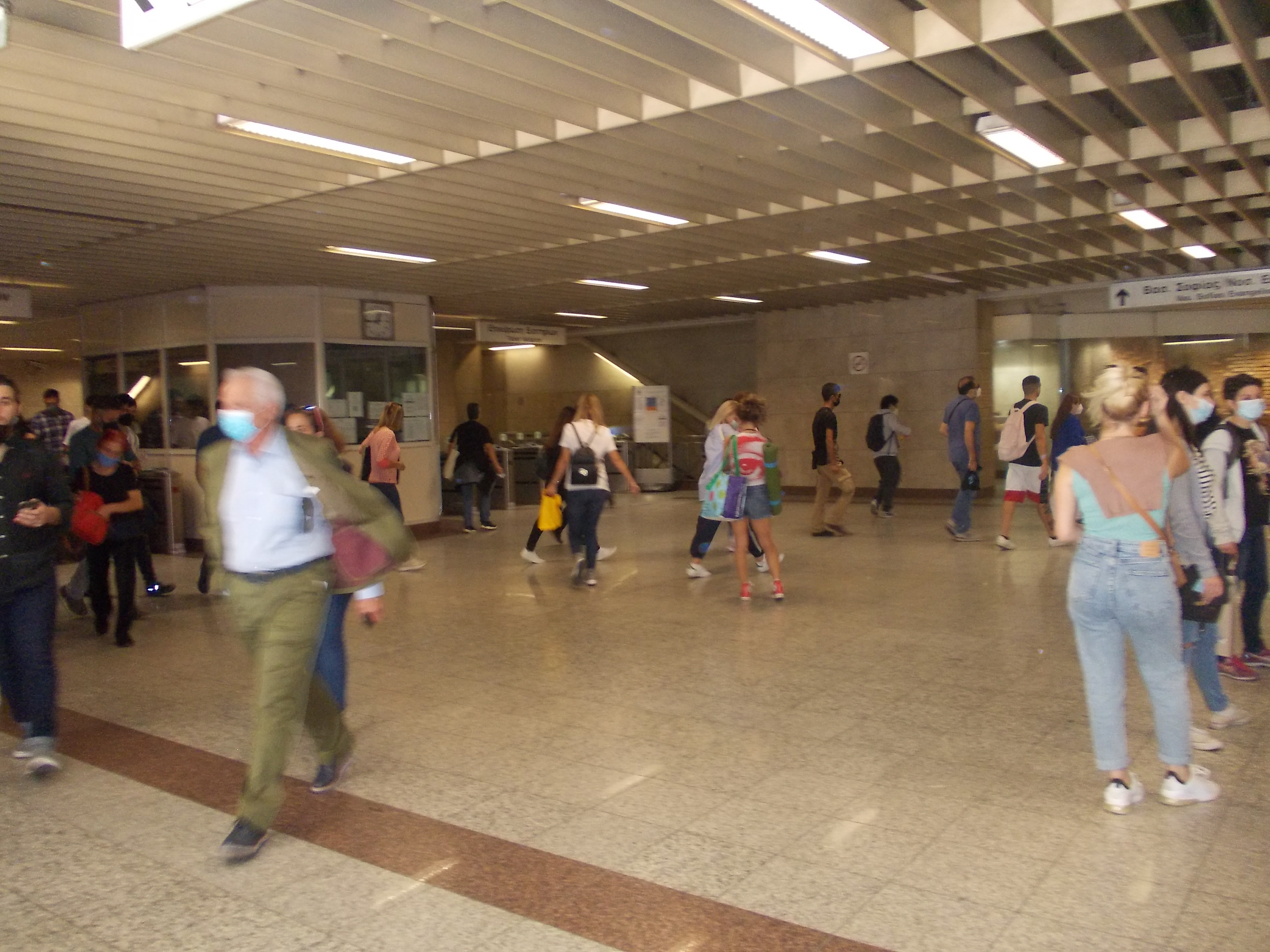
The station's concourse level

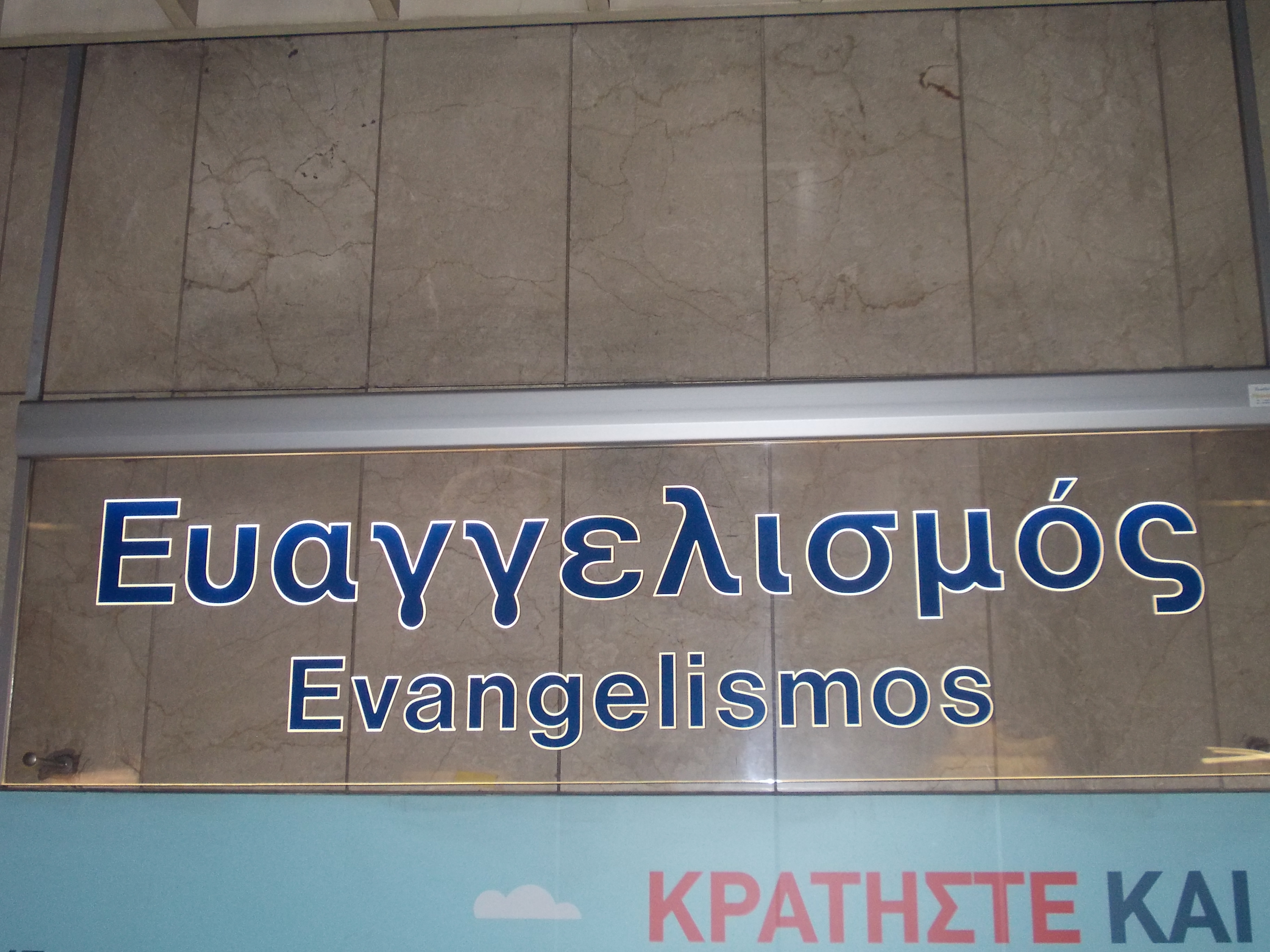
Station's sign on the platforms
