= Byzantine and Christian Museum =

Art museum in Athens, Greece

Coordinates: 37°58′29″N 23°44′40″E

Byzantine and Christian Museum Βυζαντινό και Χριστιανικό Μουσείο
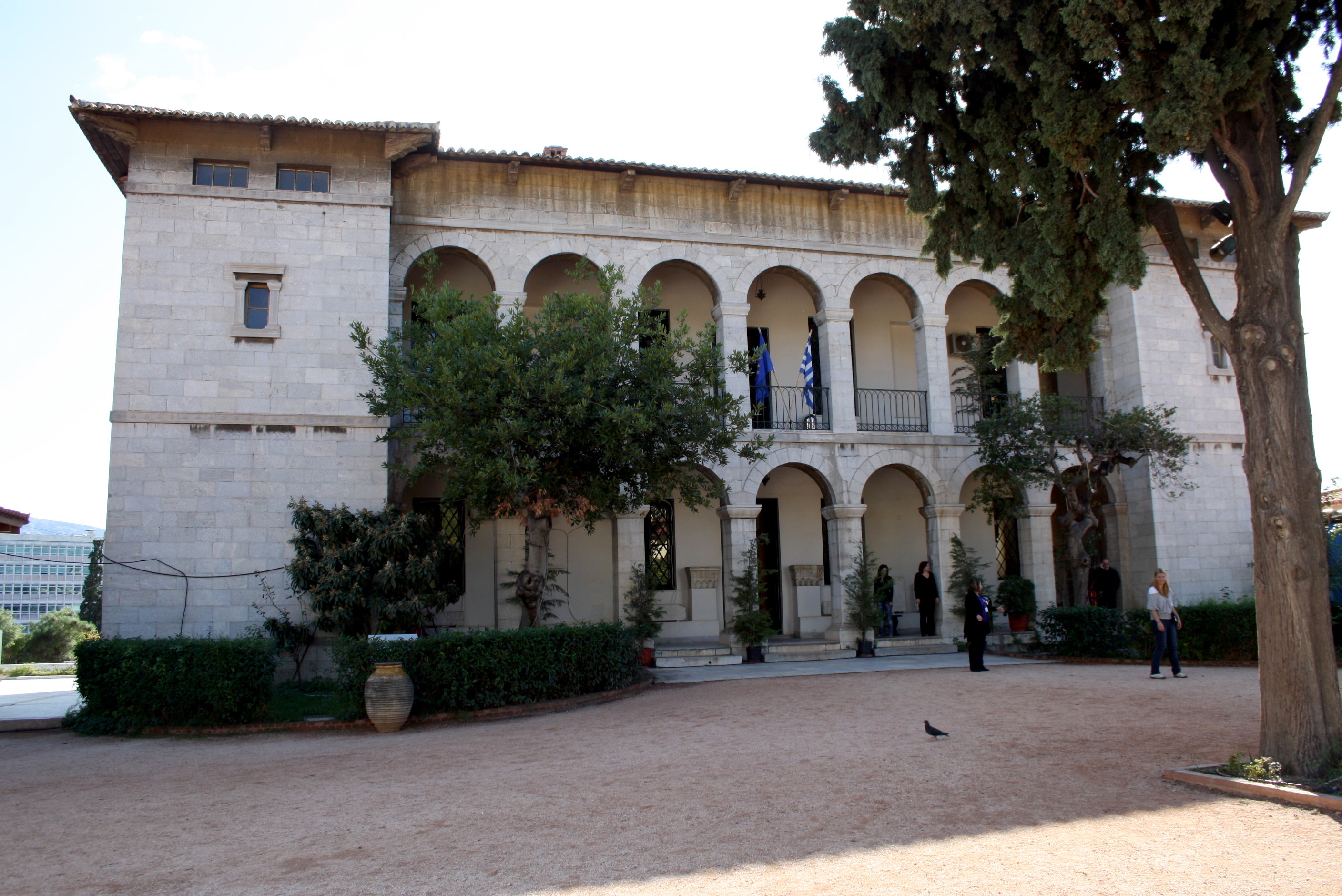

- Location within Athens
- Established: 1914; 112 years ago
- Location: Vassilissis Sofias Avenue, Athens, Greece
- Type: Art museum (Byzantine art), Christian museum
- Director: Pari Kalamara
- Public transit access: Evangelismos station
- Website: www.byzantinemuseum.gr

The Byzantine and Christian Museum (Greek: Βυζαντινό και Χριστιανικό Μουσείο) is situated at Vassilissis Sofias Avenue in Athens, Greece.

== History ==
Founded in 1914, it was originally situated on the first floor of the Academy but it was later moved to the villa of the Duchesse de Plaisance, also known as the Ilissia Villa, a building of 1848.

It houses more than 25,000 exhibits with rare collections of pictures, scriptures, frescoes, pottery, fabrics, manuscripts, and copies of artefacts from the 3rd century AD to the Late Middle Ages. In June 2004, in time for its 90th anniversary and the 2004 Athens Olympics, the museum reopened to the public after an extensive renovation and the addition of another wing.

== Visitor information ==
The gallery is situated on Vassilissis Sofias Avenue 22, down the street from the Hilton Athens. It is housed in Villa Ilissia designed by Stamatios Kleanthis. It can be reached by the Athens Metro at the Evangelismos station.

== Gallery ==
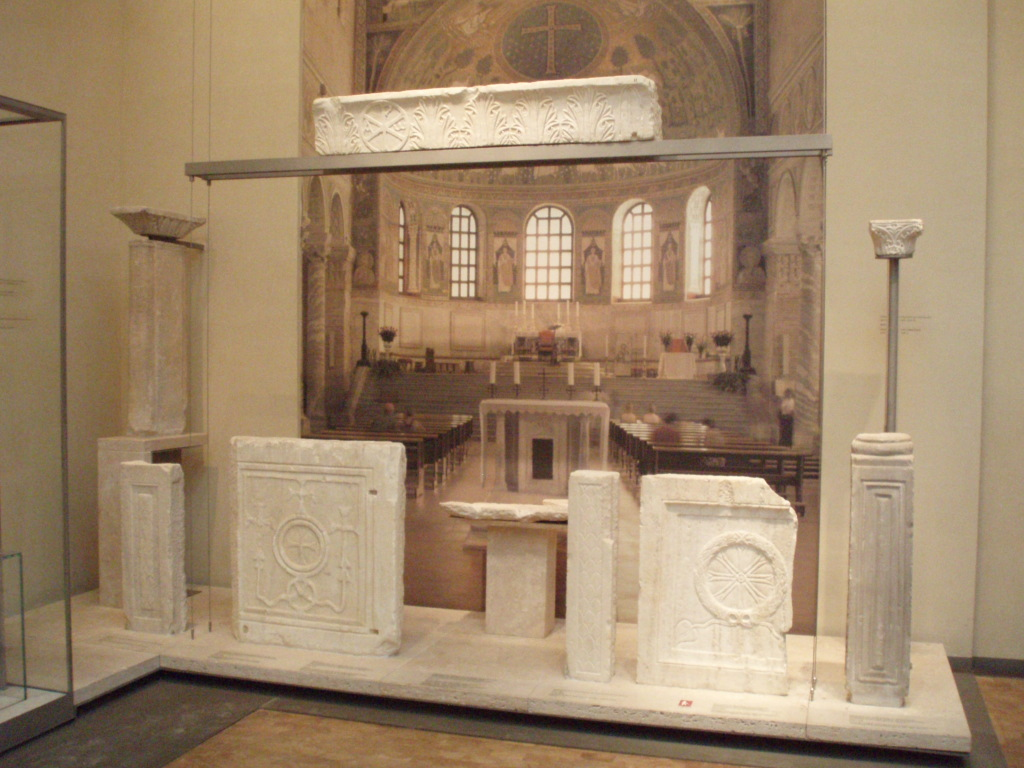
Early marble templon

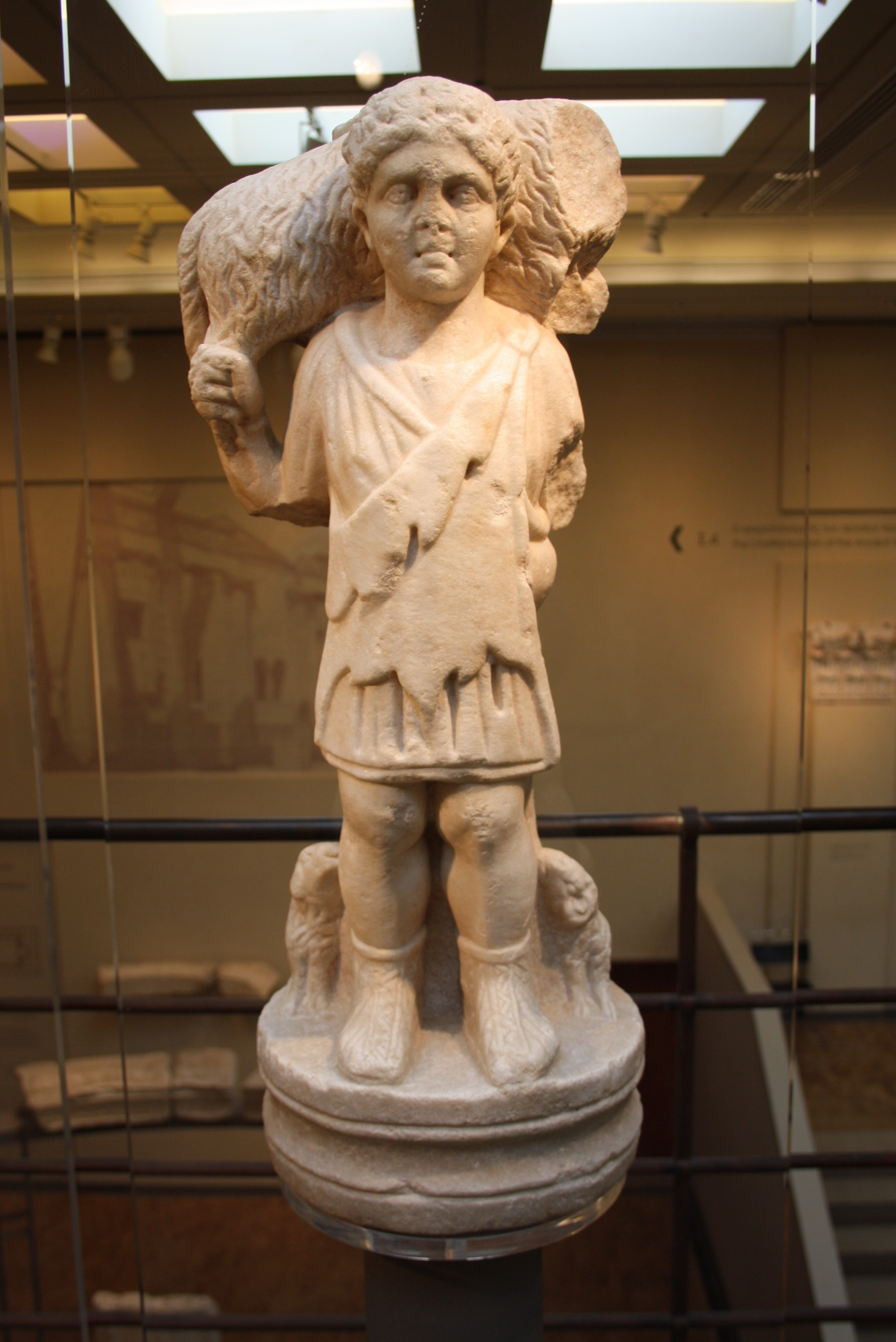
Late Roman statuette of the Good shepherd (4th century), from Corinth

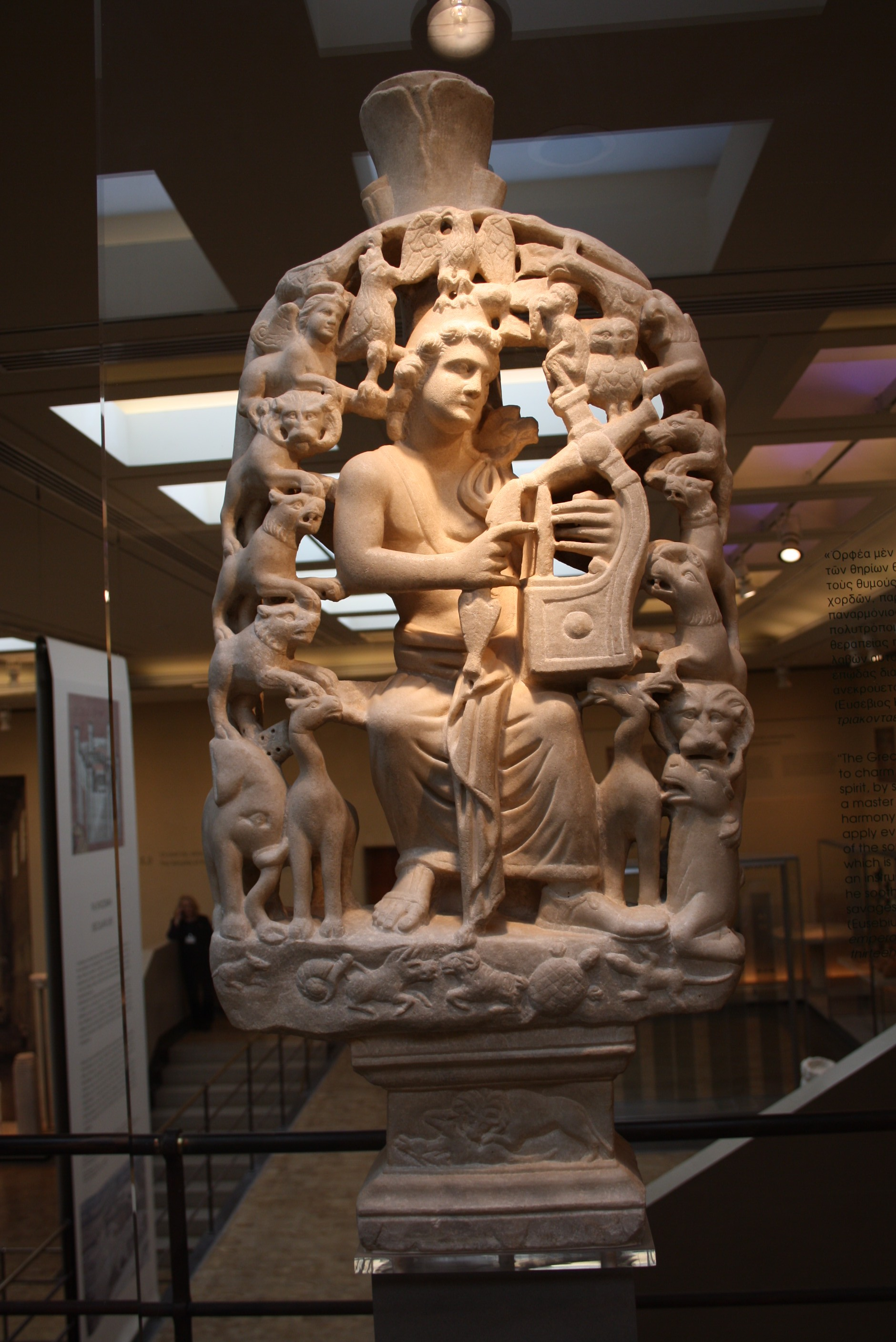
Late Roman statuette of Orpheus (4th century), from Aegina

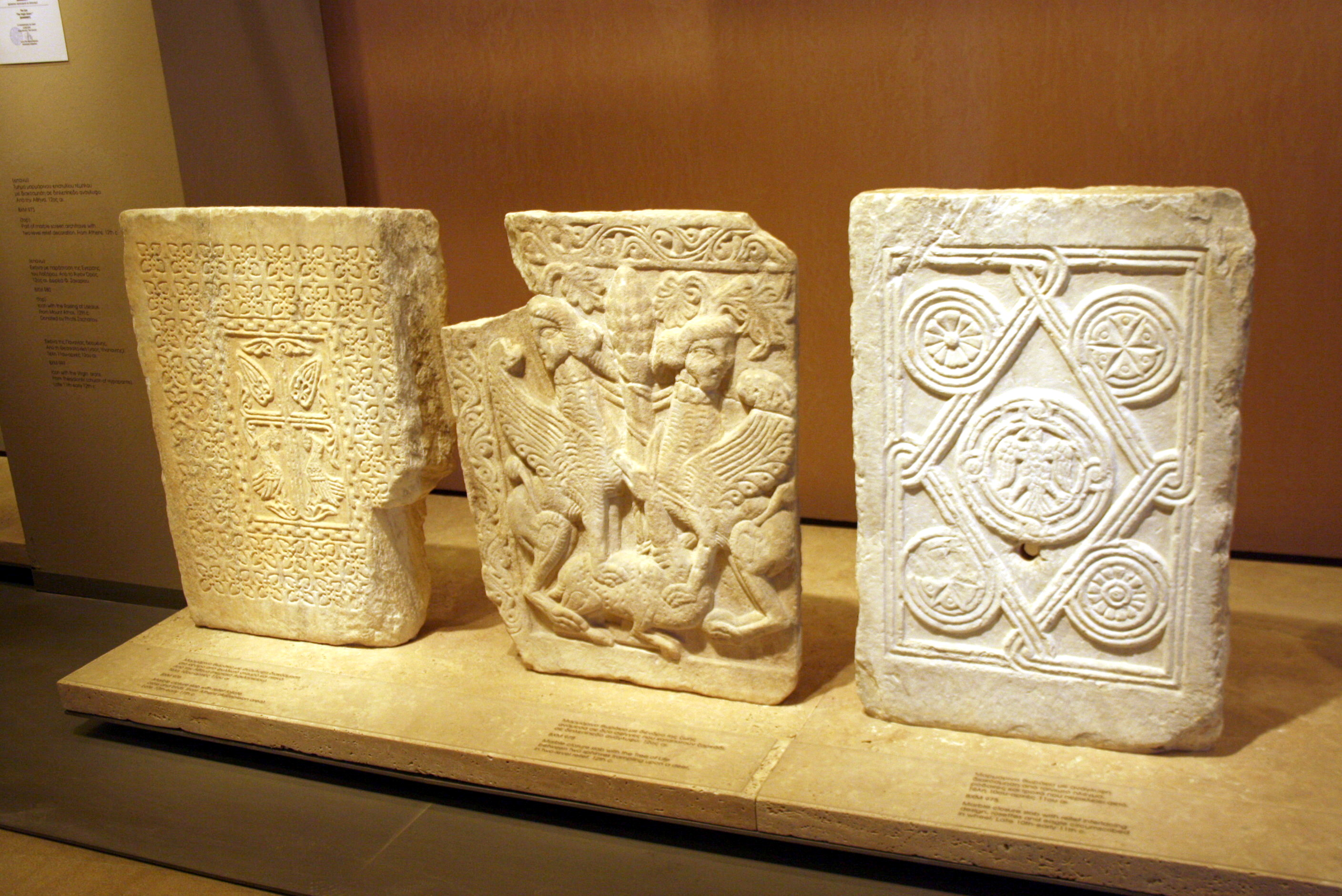
Marble slabs

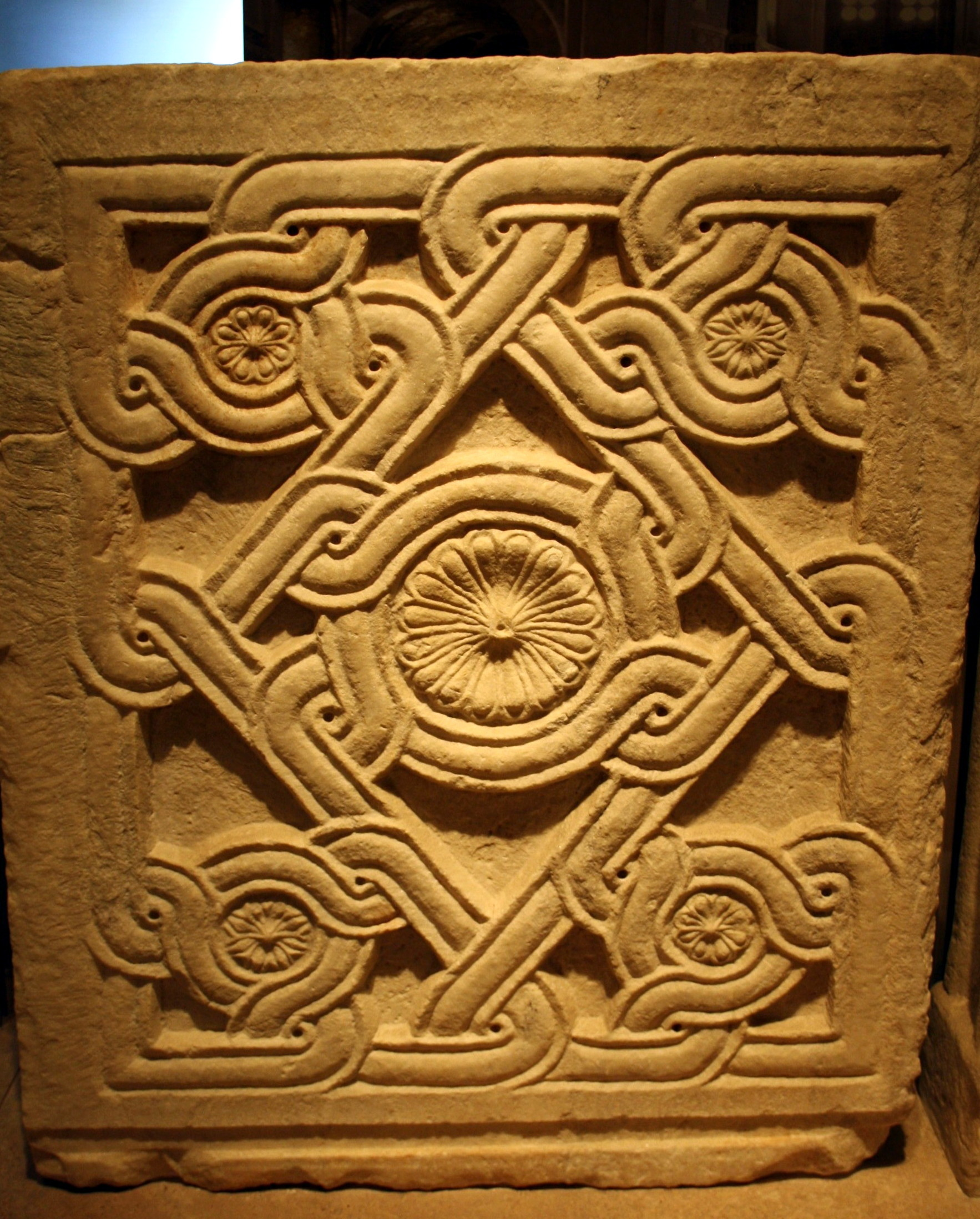
Marble slab, 11th century

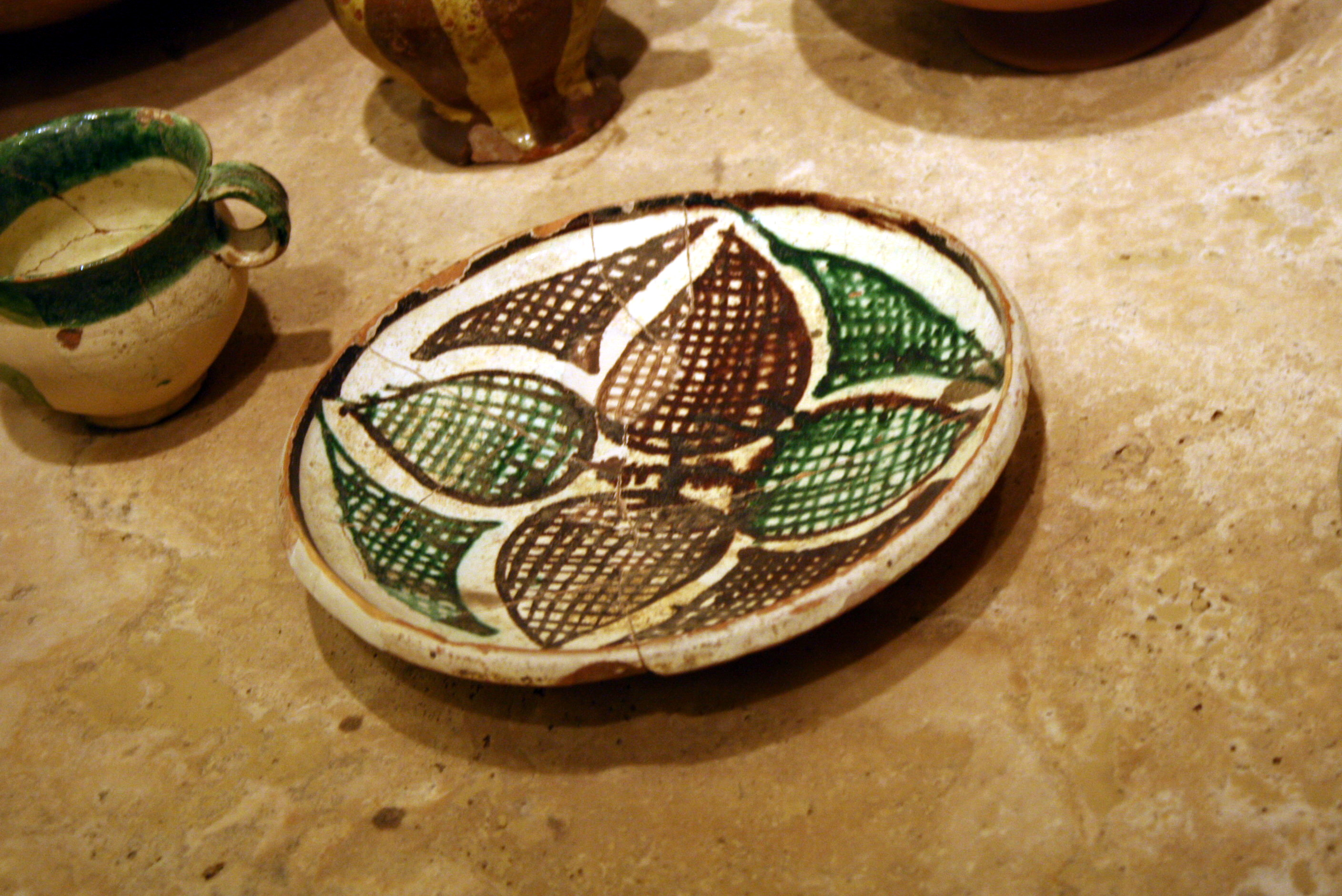
Byzantine ceramic ware (9th through 13th century)

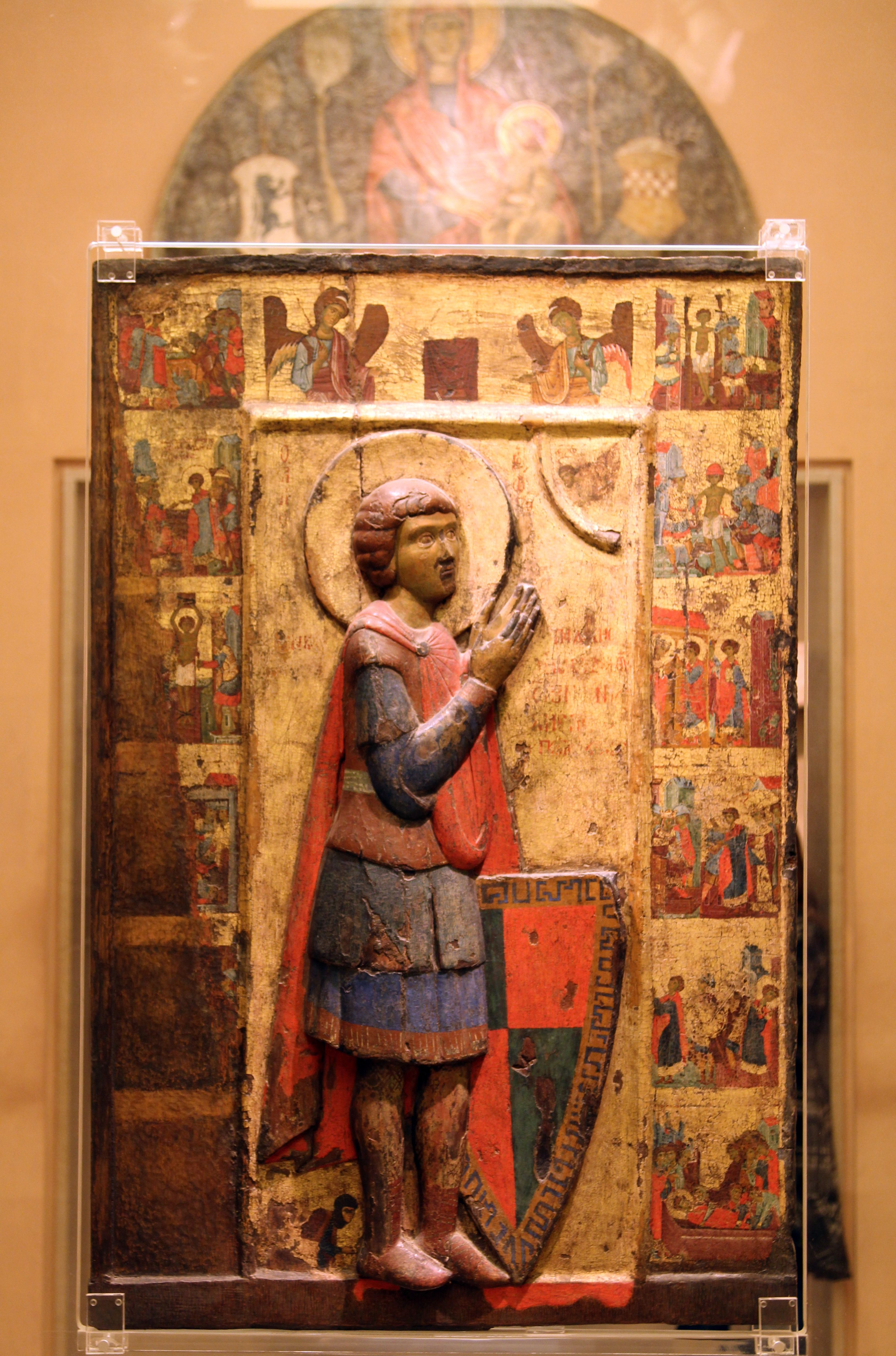
Double-sided icon with Saint George (front), from Kastoria

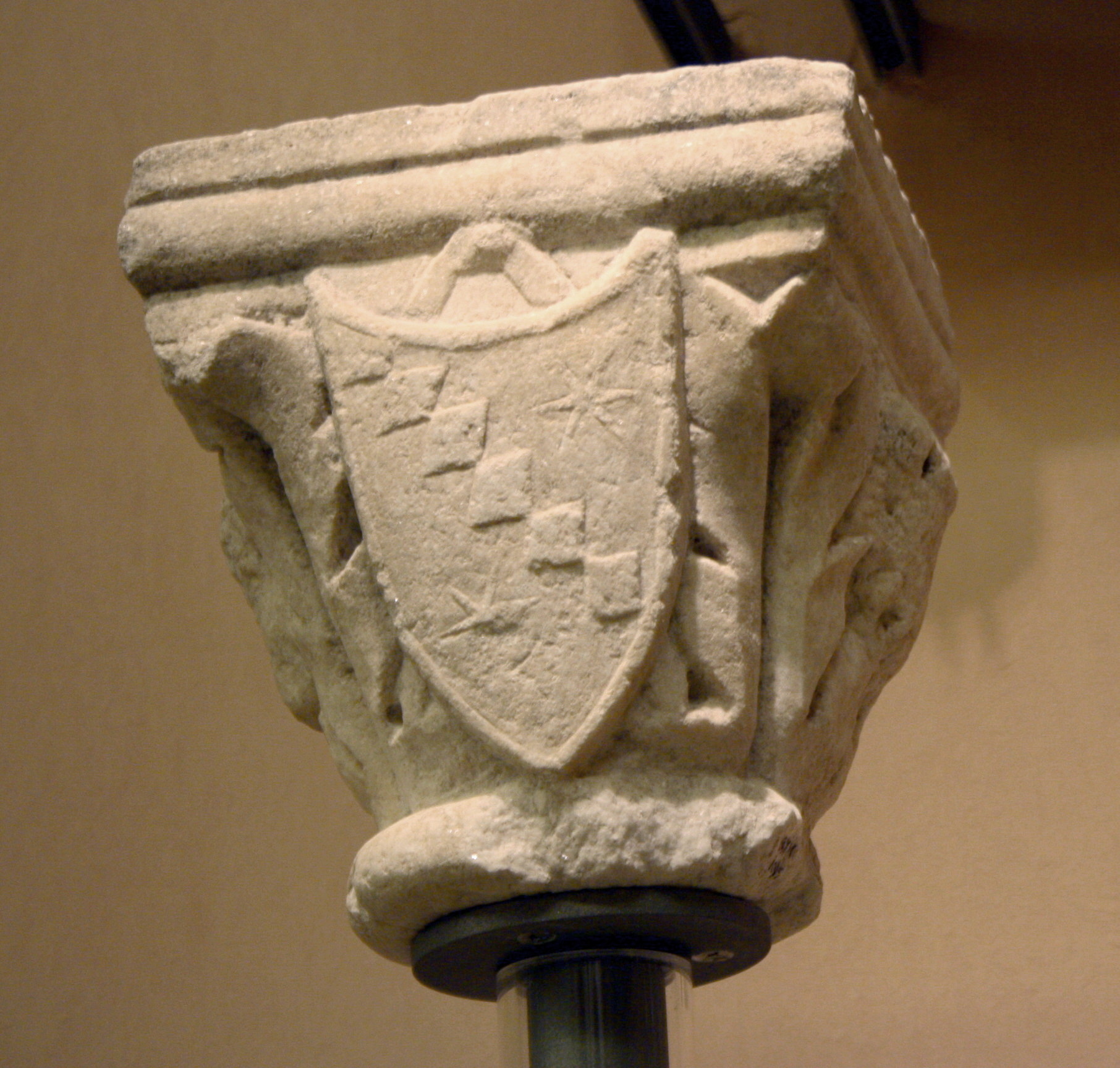
Fragments of a Gothic arcosolium (Crusaders art)

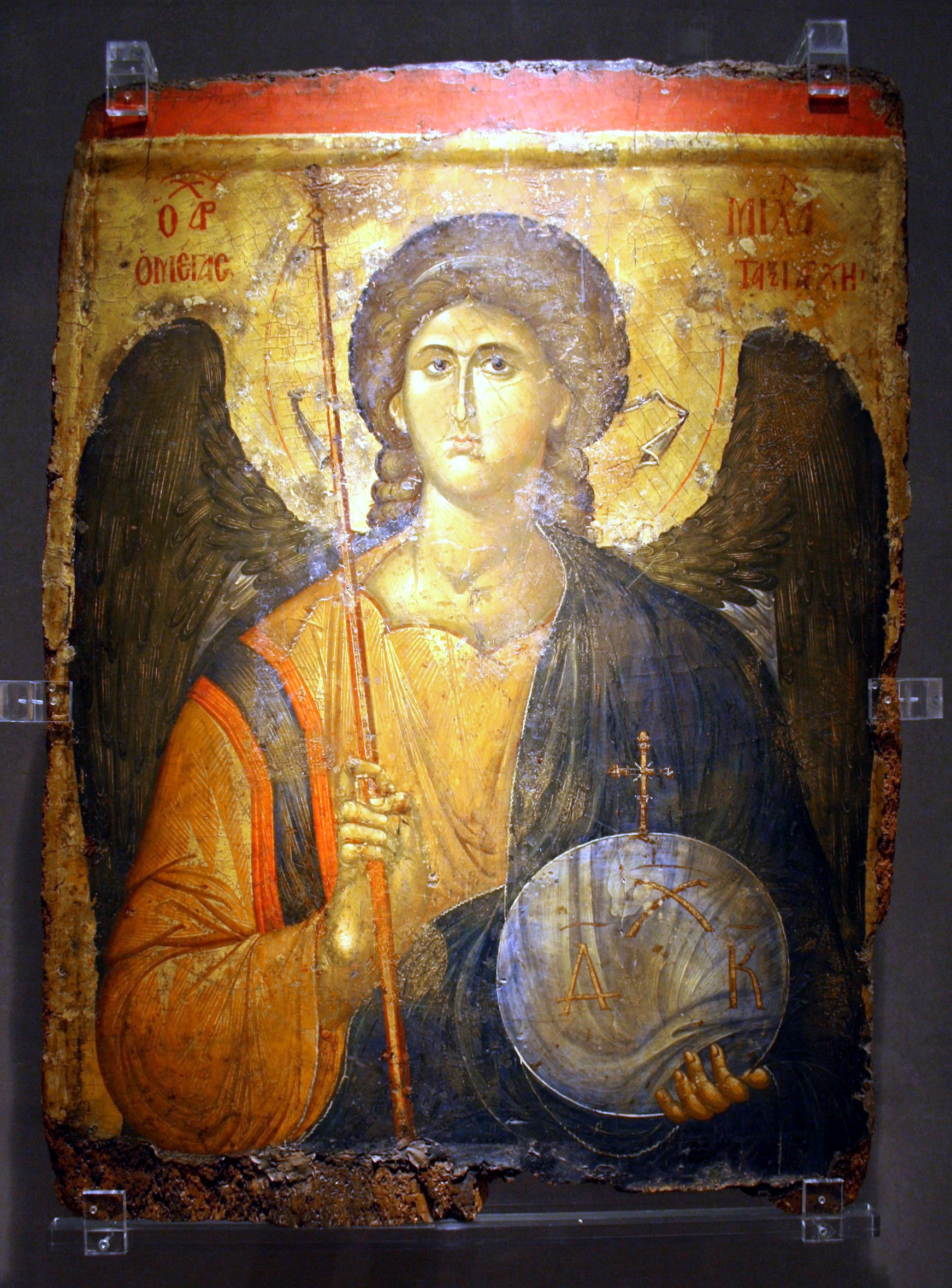
Icon of Archangel Michael (14th century)

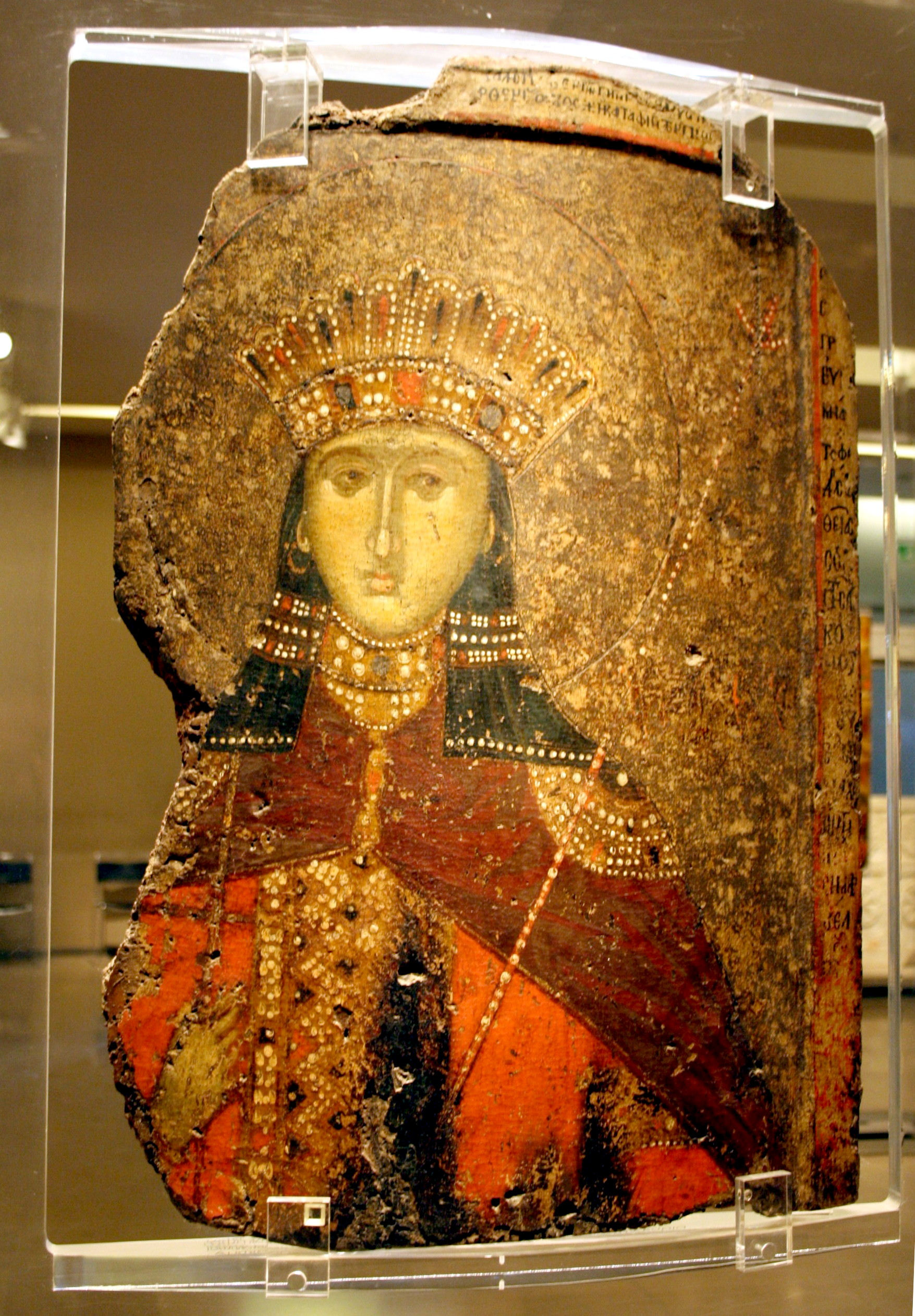
Icon of Saint Catherine, from Veria (14th century)

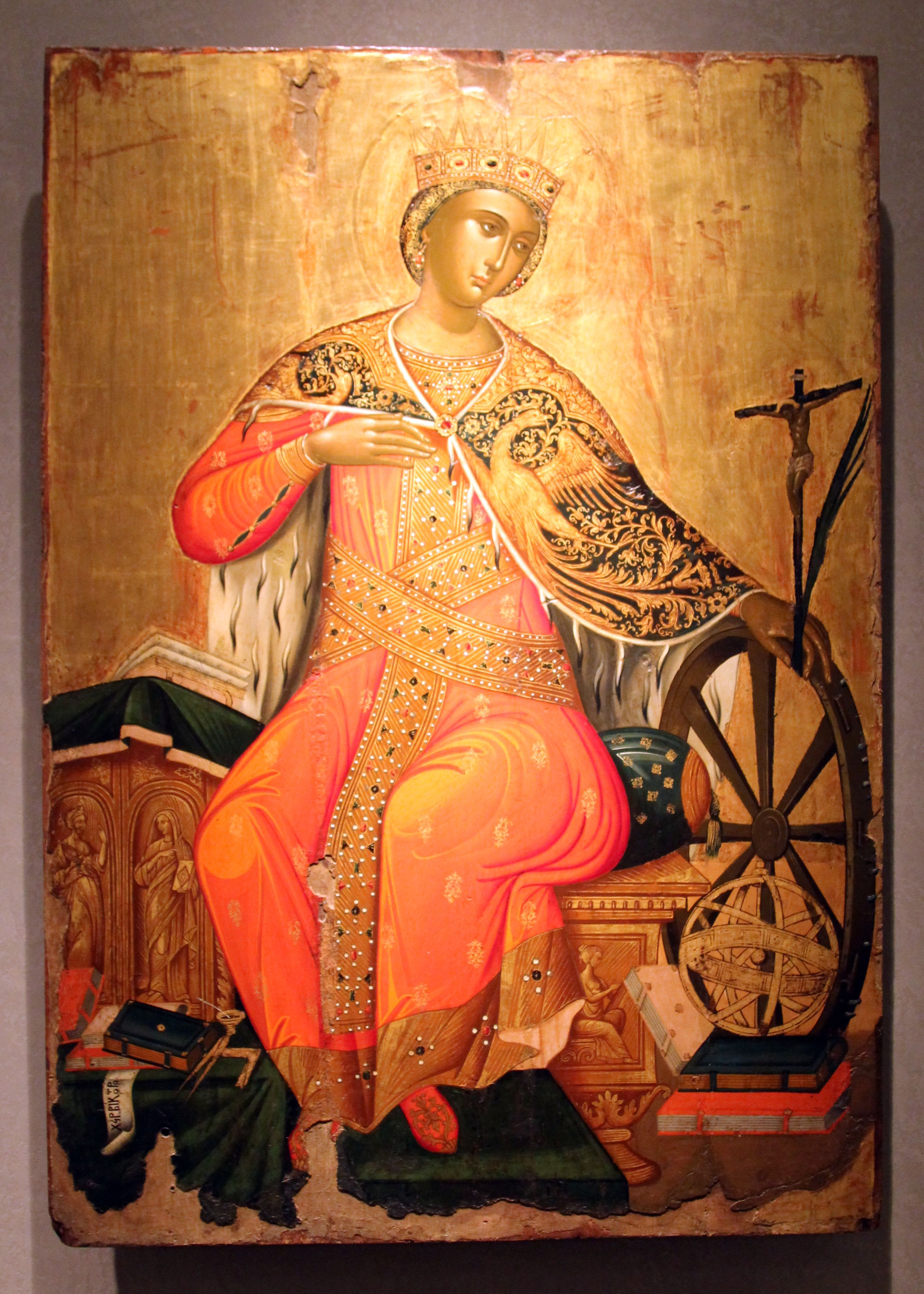
Icon of Saint Catherine (17th century)

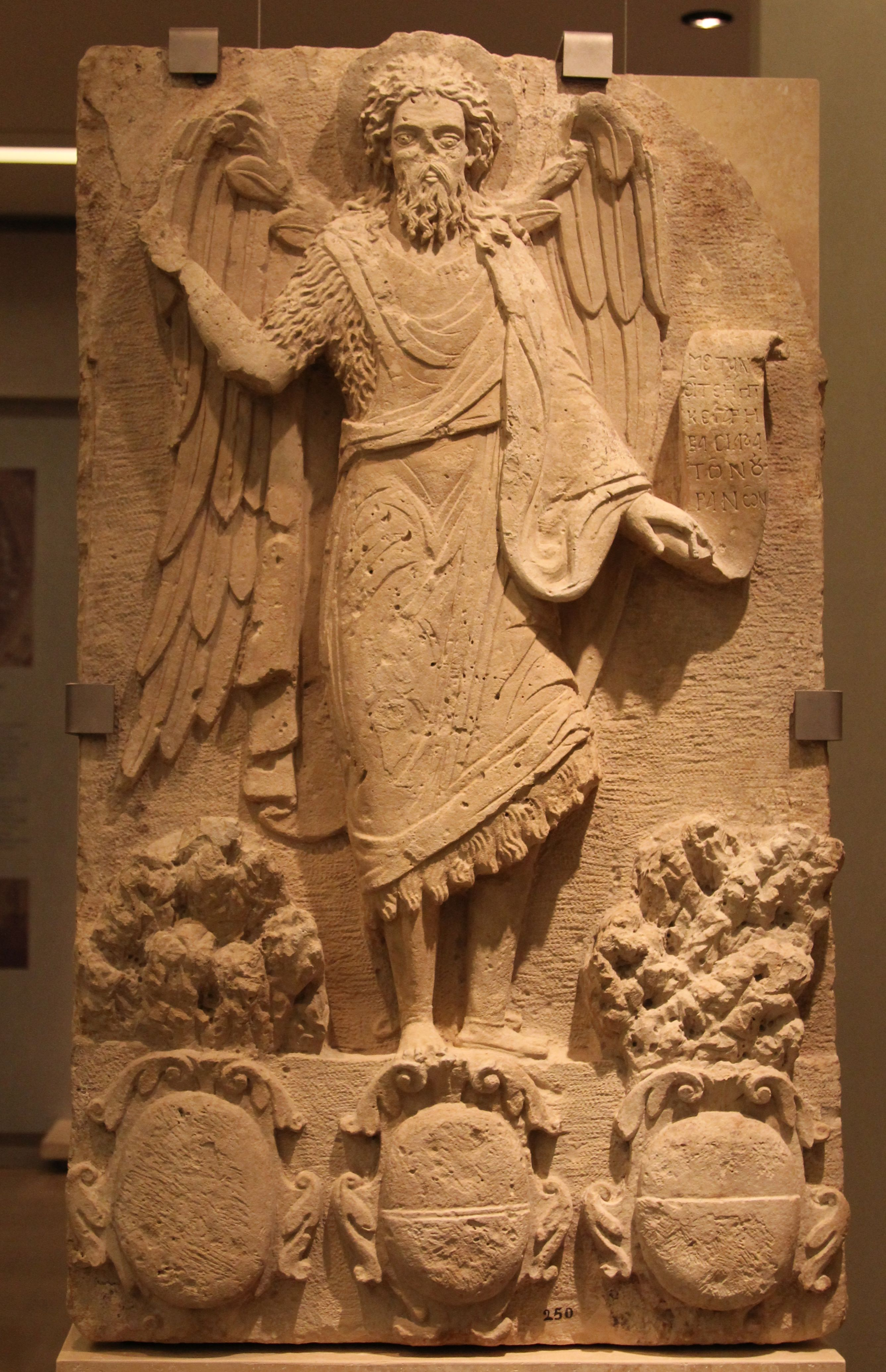
Limestone panel with the figure of St John the Baptist, from Zakynthos (17th century)

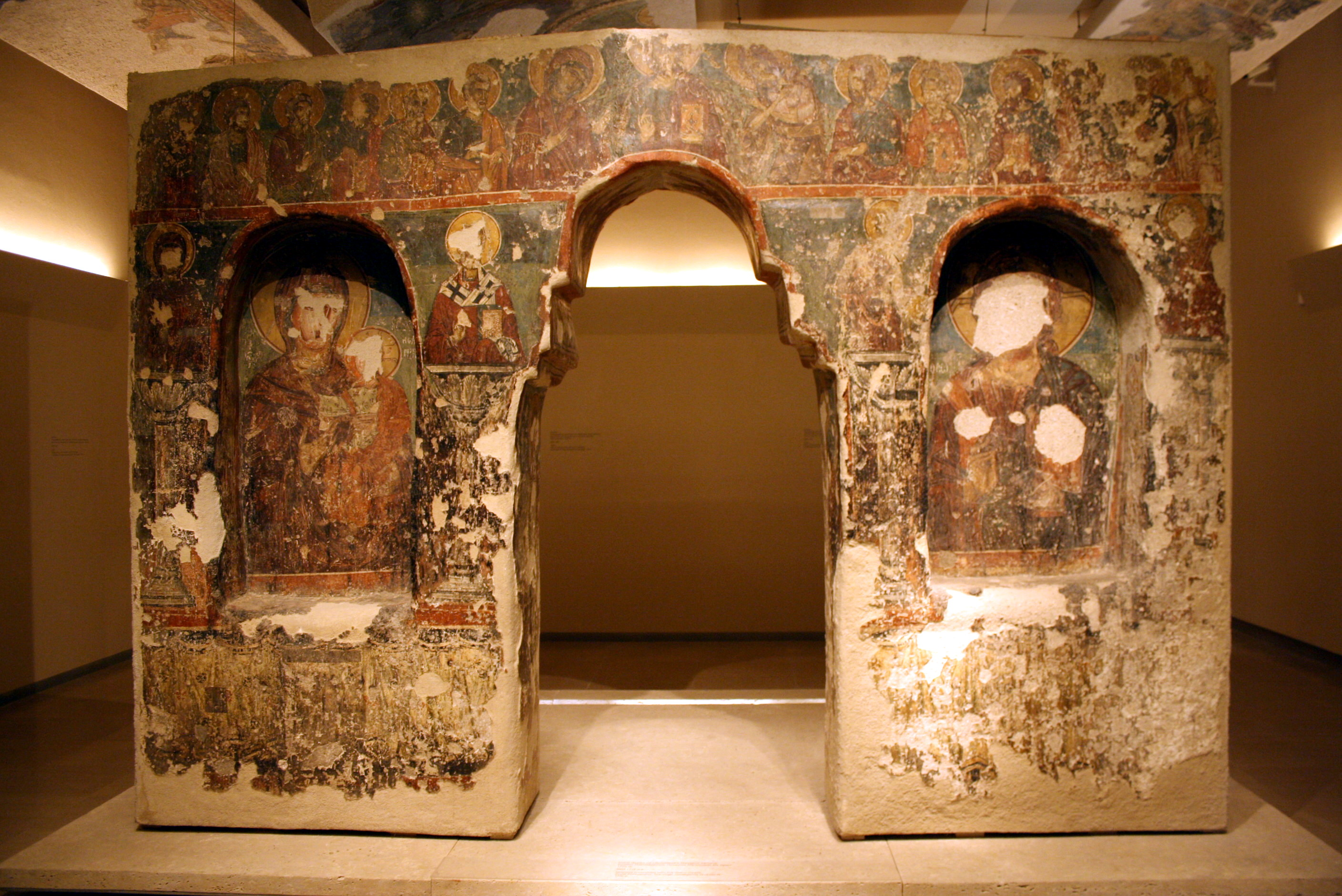
Frescoed iconostasis from Evrytania (17th century)

== See also ==
- Byzantine Art
- List of museums in Greece

== Bibliography ==
- Hatzidakis, Manolis (1987). Έλληνες Ζωγράφοι μετά την Άλωση (1450-1830). Τόμος 1: Αβέρκιος - Ιωσήφ [Greek Painters after the Fall of Constantinople (1450-1830). Volume 1: Averkios - Iosif]. Athens: Center for Modern Greek Studies, National Research Foundation. hdl:10442/14844. ISBN 960-7916-01-8.
- Hatzidakis, Manolis; Drakopoulou, Evgenia (1997). Έλληνες Ζωγράφοι μετά την Άλωση (1450-1830). Τόμος 2: Καβαλλάρος - Ψαθόπουλος [Greek Painters after the Fall of Constantinople (1450-1830). Volume 2: Kavallaros - Psathopoulos]. Athens: Center for Modern Greek Studies, National Research Foundation. hdl:10442/14088. ISBN 960-7916-00-X.
- Drakopoulou, Evgenia (2010). Έλληνες Ζωγράφοι μετά την Άλωση (1450–1830). Τόμος 3: Αβέρκιος - Ιωσήφ [Greek Painters after the Fall of Constantinople (1450–1830). Volume 3: Averkios - Joseph]. Athens, Greece: Center for Modern Greek Studies, National Research Foundation. ISBN 978-960-7916-94-5.
- Acheimastou Potamianou, Myrtalē (1998). Icons of the Byzantine Museum of Athens. Athens, Greece: Ministry of Culture. ISBN 9789602149119.
