= Mavrodendri =

Mavrodendri Μαυροδένδρι
- Community
- Location within Greece
- Coordinates: 40°22.9′N 21°46.2′E
- Country: Greece
- Administrative region: West Macedonia
- Regional unit: Kozani
- Municipality: Kozani
- Municipal unit: Dimitrios Ypsilantis
- Elevation: 720 m (2,360 ft)

Population (2021)
  - Community: 661
- Time zone: UTC+2 (EET)
  - Summer (DST): UTC+3 (EEST)
- Postal code: 501 50
- Area code: +30-2461
- Vehicle registration: ΚΖ

Mavrodendri (Greek: Μαυροδένδρι) is a village and a community of the Kozani municipality. Before the 2011 local government reform it was part of the municipality of Dimitrios Ypsilantis, of which it was a municipal district and the seat. The 2021 census recorded 661 inhabitants in the community.
