= Evangelismos Hospital =

Hospital in Athens, Greece

Coordinates: 37.977420°N 23.747470°E

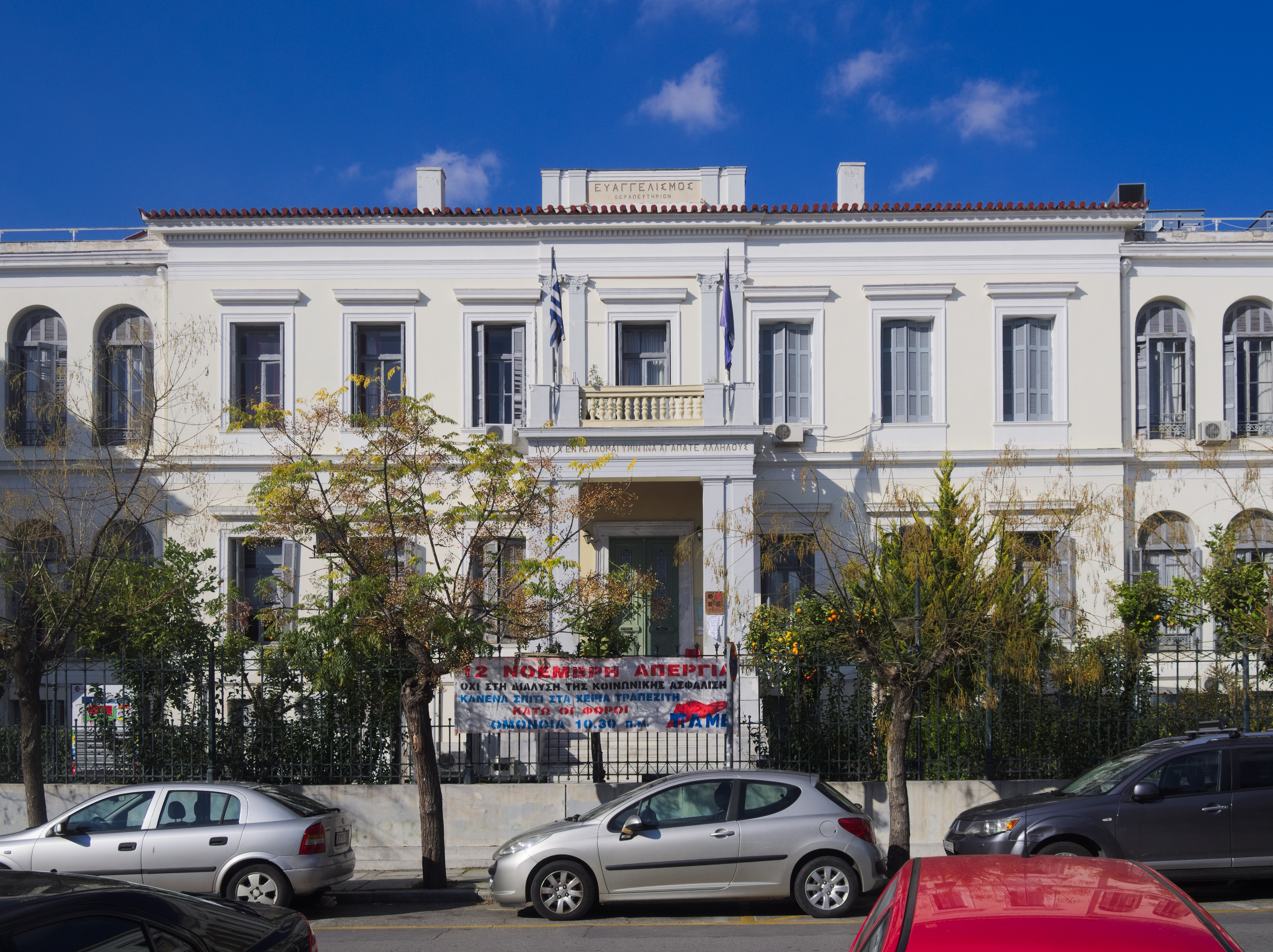
The old building of the hospital.

Athens General Hospital 'Evangelismos' (Greek: Γενικό Νοσοκομείο Αθηνών «Ο Ευαγγελισμός») is one of the largest and most prestigious hospitals in Greece. It is located in a sub-neighbourhood of Kolonaki named after it, Evangelismos.

Construction of the building began on 25 March 1881 (architect Gerasimos Metaxas and construction by Lazaros Sarantoglou) and was finished exactly three years later on 25 March 1884, when it opened to the public on 16 April. Until 1983, the hospital was run as a charitable organization, but in that year it was nationalized and became part of the public health system.

The nearby Athens Metro station Evangelismos is named after it.

Facilities and Capacity

Evangelismos Hospital is the largest general hospital in Greece, with a current capacity of approximately 1,100 beds. It serves thousands of patients annually across a wide range of departments and medical specialties.

Reputation and Recognition In a 2014 evaluation conducted by the Greek Ministry of Health, Evangelismos was listed among the top public hospitals in the country.

Medical Services and Specializations

The hospital provides comprehensive medical services, including:

Internal Medicine

Surgery

Cardiology

Neurology

Oncology

Emergency Care

Evangelismos is also one of the few Greek hospitals equipped with advanced Intensive Care Units (ICUs), specialized surgical theaters, and diagnostic laboratories.

Role in Education and Research

Evangelismos is affiliated with the National and Kapodistrian University of Athens and plays a crucial role in training medical students and residents. It supports a wide range of postgraduate education programs and is involved in clinical research, often partnering with international institutions.

Modernization and Innovation

In recent years, the hospital has undergone several upgrades, focusing on:

Digital recordkeeping

Telemedicine services

Updated diagnostic imaging equipment

Minimally invasive surgical procedures

These improvements have helped streamline patient care and reduce wait times, particularly in emergency and high-demand departments.

In March 2026, the hospital's school building will undergo a major renovation thanks to an €11 million donation from shipping company Costamare.

Public and Community Health Impact

As a central part of Greece's public health system, Evangelismos Hospital treats both emergency and chronic conditions and supports public health initiatives such as vaccination programs and disease prevention campaigns. It operates under the umbrella of the Hellenic National Health System (ESY), and collaborates with other hospitals and clinics across the country
