= Dimitrios Ypsilantis (municipality) =

Dimitrios Ypsilantis Δημήτριος Υψηλάντης
- Municipal unit
- Location within the regional unit

- Location within Greece
- Coordinates: 40°23′N 21°46′E
- Country: Greece
- Administrative region: West Macedonia
- Regional unit: Kozani
- Municipality: Kozani

Area
  - Municipal unit: 112.071 km^{2} (43.271 sq mi)

Population (2021)
  - Municipal unit: 1,392
  - Municipal unit density: 12.42/km^{2} (32.17/sq mi)
- Time zone: UTC+2 (EET)
  - Summer (DST): UTC+3 (EEST)
- Vehicle registration: KZ

Dimitrios Ypsilantis (Greek: Δημήτριος Υψηλάντης) is a former municipality in Kozani regional unit, West Macedonia, Greece. Since the 2011 local government reform it is part of the municipality Kozani, of which it is a municipal unit. It was named after Demetrios Ypsilantis, a 19th-century leader of the Greek struggle for independence. The municipal unit has an area of 112.071 km^{2}. Population 1,392 (2021). The seat of the municipality was in Mavrodendri.
