= Kato Souli Naval Transmission Facility =

Greek military communications center

Coordinates: 38°08′42.67″N 24°01′10.93″E

Kato Souli Naval Transmission Facility (Greek: Κέντρο Εκπομπής Κάτω Σουλίου) is a facility used by the Greek Navy for transmitting messages to submarines in the Low Frequency range at Kato Souli near Marathon, Greece. It was commissioned in 1989 and uses as its tallest antenna tower a 250-metre-tall guyed mast with an umbrella antenna, the tallest structure in Greece. The site has an area of 260 ha (650 acres). Nearby there was a transmission site of the US Navy with several shortwave transmitters.
