= Athens Towers =

- Athens Towers as seen from Lycabettus Hill
- Interactive map of the Athens Towers area

General information
- Status: Completed
- Type: Office
- Location: Athens, Greece
- Coordinates: 37.984587°N 23.760874°E
- Construction started: 1968
- Completed: 1971

Height
- Height: 103 m (338 ft) - Athens Tower 1; 65 m (213 ft) - Athens Tower 2

Technical details
- Floor count: 28 - Athens Tower 1; 15 - Athens Tower 2

Athens Towers (Greek: Πύργος Αθηνών), is a complex of two buildings situated in Athens, Greece. Athens Tower 1 is 103 m (338 ft) and 28 stories high, making it the tallest building in Greece, while Athens Tower 2 has 15 storeys and a height of 65 m (213 ft) being the 8th tallest in Greece.

Construction began in 1968 and was completed in 1971 during the dictatorship. At the time of its completion it was the second tallest building in Southeast Europe. It is located in the district of Ampelokipi on 2 Mesogeion Avenue. It is used by many companies such as Interamerican Insurance and Alpha Bank. The architects of Athens Towers were Ioannis Vikelas, who also designed the main building of the Goulandris Museum of Cycladic Art, and Ioannis Kympritis. Despite the criticism it has received due to its design and high height, the Tower of Athens is today considered to be one of the landmarks of Athens.

== History ==
View of Athens Tower 1 from Kifissias Avenue

The Athens Tower was built in a period when the developmental law restricting the maximum height of a building wasn't active, with the law 395/68 "On the height of buildings and free construction" with which the buildings were given the freedom to be arranged in any way inside the plot to ensure the best lighting and ventilation. Up until 1968 the maximum allowed height of a building was 35 meters, from 1985 to 2000 the maximum allowed building height was 32 meters, from 2000 to 2012 27 meters and from 2012 to present 32 meters. Until 1968, the tallest building in Athens was the 14 storey Athens Hilton, which was completed in 1963. The construction of the Athens Tower started in 1968 and was undertaken by Αλβέρτης - Δημόπουλος (Alivertis-Dimopoulos) Α.Ε., one of the biggest construction companies of the time. For the construction of the building the 2-4 Messogeion Avenue site was granted. The building was completed in 1971. During the 1990s telecommunication antennas were added on the roof of the building.

== Description ==
Athens Tower as seen from street level

The Tower of Athens is less than 100 meters high without the antenna masts, has 28 floors and is still the tallest building in Greece. The architecture of the tower is minimalistic and futuristic and is an imitation of other buildings in Europe and America, like the Seagram Building. Typical is the use of glass curtains on the exterior walls of the building with aluminum frame. The use of glass curtains has since become commonplace for large commercial buildings in Athens. The vertical axis of the building is accentuated by white marble columns and vertical columns in the brown anodized aluminum glazing.

The Tower of Athens is built with the method of composite construction, with steel columns and reinforced concrete slabs, in contrast to other tall buildings of the time. Because the builders didn't have expertise in the construction of large steel structures, more emphasis was placed on the reinforced concrete. It was the first building in the Balkans to be constructed using this technique.

Additionally, the pioneering technique of the plastic foundation was used for the building's construction, which had been developed by the professor of Statics and Dynamics of the Polytechnic School of the University of Patras, Aristarchos Oikonomou, who also carried out the statics of the building. Plastic foundations work in a similar way to dampers. Another innovation of the building was the use of plasterboard inside the building, which helped reduce the weight of the building. The partitions of the interior of the Tower of Athens are mobile, making it possible to easily change the interior layout. Below the Tower there are three basements, for parking, warehouses and an engine room.

Next to the Tower of Athens is a smaller tower less than 56 meters high, with 12 floors, with common design features regarding the facade. But unlike the Tower of Athens, the smaller tower is zigzagged. It is connected to it at the first floor. According to the original plan, a two-storey extended base would be built on the plot, on which the Tower would be located. However, the plans changed and a square with two unequal towers was finally built. The buildings house shops and offices.

== See also ==
- Apollo Tower
- List of tallest buildings in Athens
