= Dasochori =

Dasochori Δασοχώρι
- Community
- Location within Greece
- Coordinates: 39°53′N 21°49′E
- Country: Greece
- Administrative region: Western Macedonia
- Regional unit: Grevena
- Municipality: Grevena
- Municipal unit: Deskati

Population (2021)
  - Community: 156
- Time zone: UTC+2 (EET)
  - Summer (DST): UTC+3 (EEST)

Dasochori (Greek: Δασοχώρι, before 1927: Πιτσούγγια – Pitsoungia) is a settlement in the Grevena regional unit, northern Greece. It is part of the municipality Deskati.
