= Evangelismos, Athens =

Evangelismos Ευαγγελισμός
- Neighborhood
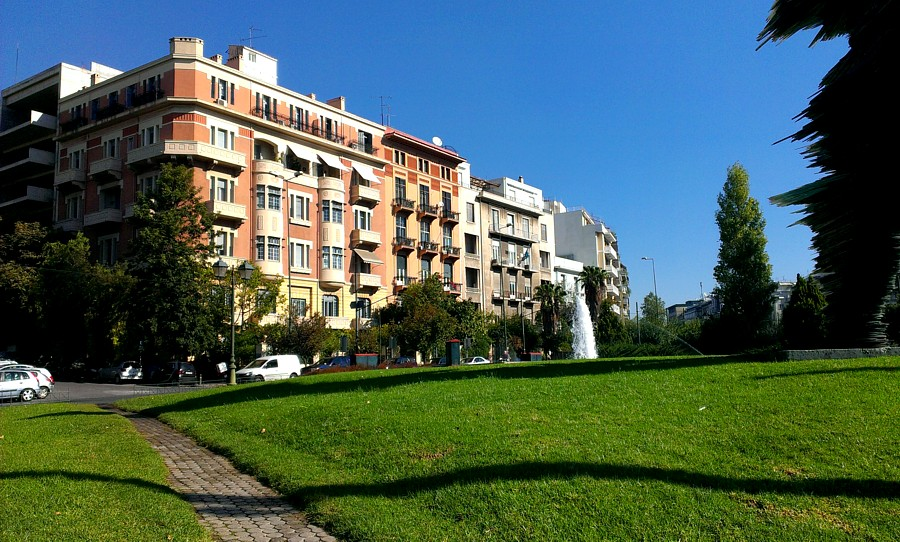
- Buildings in area

- Location within Athens municipality
- Coordinates: 37°58′39″N 23°44′56″E
- Country: Greece
- Region: Attica
- City: Athens
- Postal code: 106 76, 115 21
- Area code: 210
- Website: www.cityofathens.gr

Evangelismos (Greek: Ευαγγελισμός pronounced [e.va.ŋɟe.liˈzmos]) is a small neighborhood of Athens, Greece, named after Evangelismos Hospital. It is located within Kolonaki.

The area is served by the a metro station of the same name on Line 3 of the Athens metro.
