= Apollo Tower =

- Πύργος «Απόλλων»
- Apollo Tower residential high-rise building side view

General information
- Status: Completed
- Architectural style: Modern
- Location: Λουΐζης Ριανκούρ 64, Ampelokipoi, Athens, Greece
- Coordinates: 37.992640°N 23.764073°E
- Height: 80 m (262 ft)

Technical details
- Floor count: 25

Apollo Tower is a residential high-rise in Ampelokipoi, Athens. It is the tallest residential building in Greece, standing at 80 m (≈262,5 ft). It has 25 floors.

== History ==
During the reign of the Greek Military Junta, the height limit for buildings was abolished, thus giving room for much taller buildings to be built. So in 1973, Apollo Tower was able to be built. Thanks to having been built with generators, during a powerful earthquake of 1981 that happened in Athens, Apollo Tower was one of the only buildings that stayed intact and even had power. The same happened during the deadly 1999 earthquake. The Building back then had a bar on the rooftop with a pool. Today the bar is closed and the pool is empty. Also, today many of the apartments made for living are now used as offices and clinics. In fact, residents often joke about having a domiciliary hospital. The tower lacks a 13th floor (the actual 13th floor is named 14th) because 13 is regarded as a number of bad luck.

On 9 August 2013, a man, later found to be called Basilis Theodorou (Βασίλης Θεοδώρου), recorded and uploaded footage on YouTube of him BASE jumping off the 25th floor. The video garnered over 5.000 views and some media attention from local outlets in Greece.
