= Presidential Mansion, Athens =

Presidential Mansion
- Προεδρικό Μέγαρο (Greek)
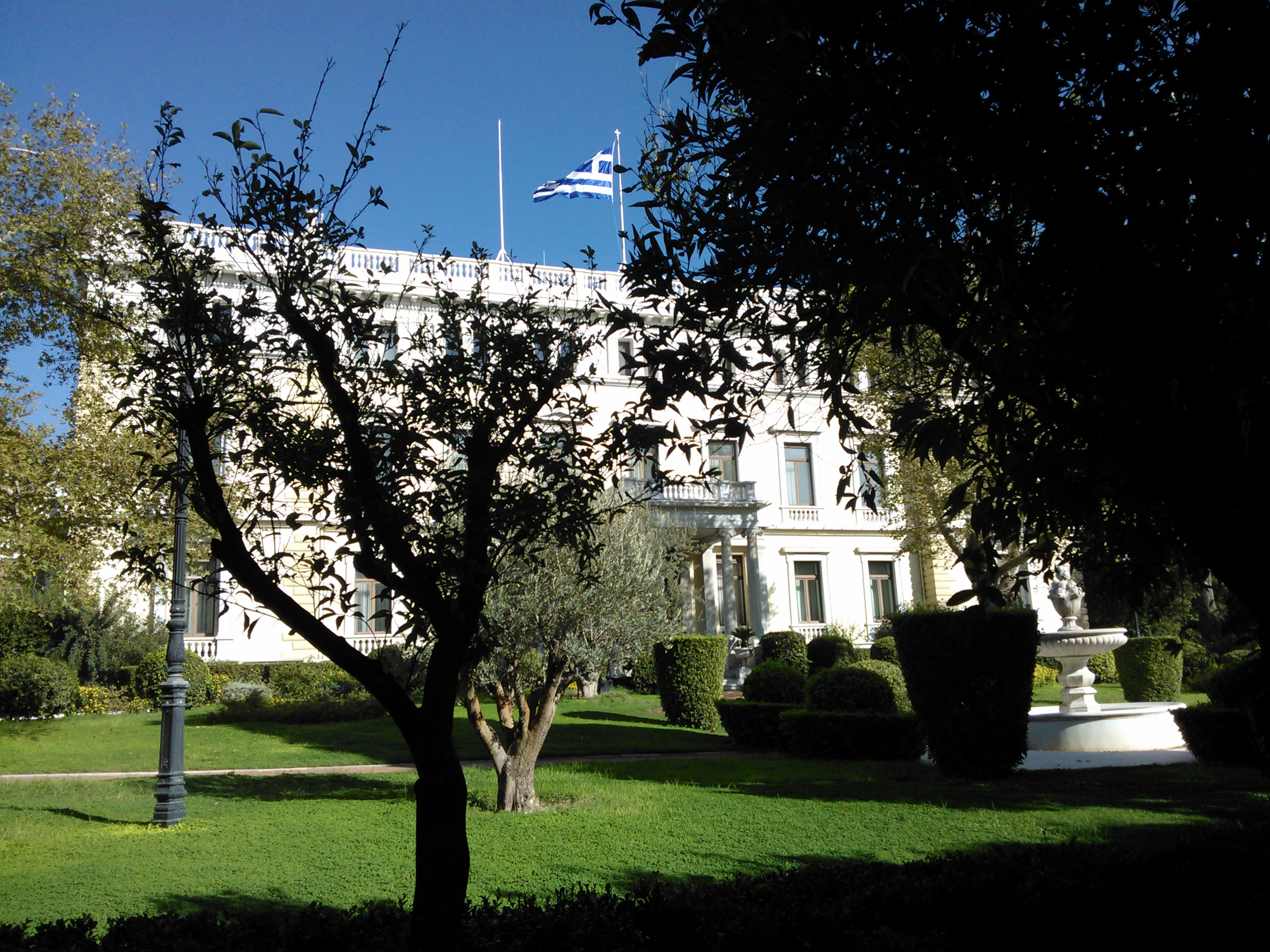
- View of the Presidential Mansion and its main entrance on Herodou Atticou St. in Athens

- Location within Athens

General information
- Type: Palace
- Architectural style: Neoclassicism
- Location: Athens, Greece
- Coordinates: 37°58′21.43″N 23°44′27″E
- Construction started: 1891
- Completed: 1897
- Client: George I of Greece

Design and construction
- Architect: Ernst Ziller

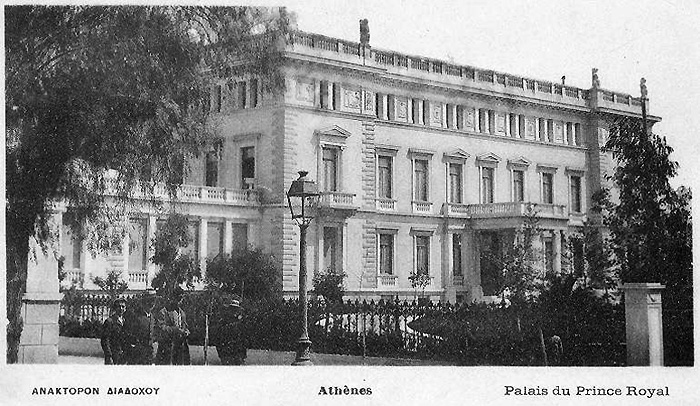
Crown Prince's palace in 1909

The Presidential Mansion (Greek: Προεδρικό Μέγαρο, romanized: Proedrikó Mégaro) in Athens, Greece, is the official residence of the president of the Hellenic Republic. It served previously as the Royal Palace (often known as the New Royal Palace, Greek: Νέα Ανάκτορα, romanized: Néa Anáktora), until the abolition of the monarchy by the 1974 referendum.

== History ==
The decision to construct the building which currently is used as the Presidential Mansion was made in 1868. That year, King George I's son, Constantine, the heir to the throne, was born and the Greek state decided to present him with a private dwelling, when he came of age. Twenty-one years later when Constantine married princess Sophia of Prussia, the state assigned the planning of "The Crown Prince's Palace", as the building became known, to Ernst Ziller. Building began in 1891 and was completed six years later in 1897.

On Christmas Eve, 1909, a fire destroyed a large part of the Royal Palace (now used by Parliament), with the result that the Crown Prince's Palace was used temporarily as the residence of the royal family. After the assassination of George I in 1913 and the accession of Constantine to the throne, the Crown Prince's Palace finally became the main royal residence of the king of the Hellenes.

The use of the building as a palace was interrupted in 1924, when the monarchy was ended and a republic was declared. It was then used as the Presidential Mansion until 1935, when the monarchy was restored and the King returned. Since 1974, when democracy was restored after a seven-year military dictatorship, the building has been used as the Presidential Mansion and the residence of the president.

== Location ==
The land on which the Presidential Mansion was built was, until the final decades of the nineteenth century, outside city limits. The eastern limit of the town was the Royal Palace. Beyond that, there were fields and small farms. The only buildings appearing on the maps of the period were the manor of the Duchess of Plaisance (known as "Ilissia" and today housing the Byzantine Museum) and the Petraki Monastery, both built in country areas far from the centre of town.

The limited significance of the area at the time may be revealed by the fact that a girl's orphanage (which no longer exists) was built there in 1854. Furthermore, the land along Kifissias Avenue (now named Vasilissis Sofias Avenue) also remained unbuilt and was reserved by the state for the construction of ministry buildings.

In early 1870 the state allowed the sale of land to private individuals which resulted in the construction of mansions to house the wealthy families of Athens. About 1890, the architect Ernst Ziller was entrusted with the construction of the Crown Prince's Palace. This palace later became the residence of the royal family and is used now as the Presidential Mansion.

During modern times, with the city of Athens extending over many square miles, the Presidential Mansion is located near the centre of the capital next to the National Garden and Parliament. Herodou Attikou Street, where the mansion is located, is not only one of the most beautiful roads in the city but is also bound to the political and social life of Greece, as also situated there is the Maximos Mansion where the prime minister of Greece has his official office.

The Presidential Mansion with its garden occupies a total area of about 27,000 square metres (about 7 acres). The official entrance to the mansion is on Herodou Attikou Street.

== Design and construction ==
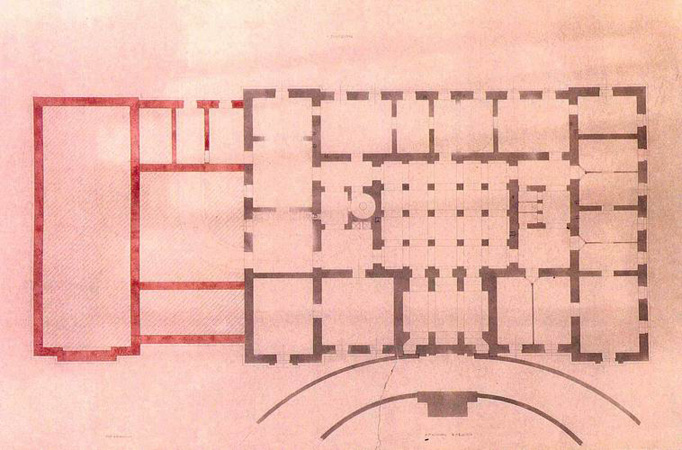
The original Ernst Ziller's architectural plan of the ground floor

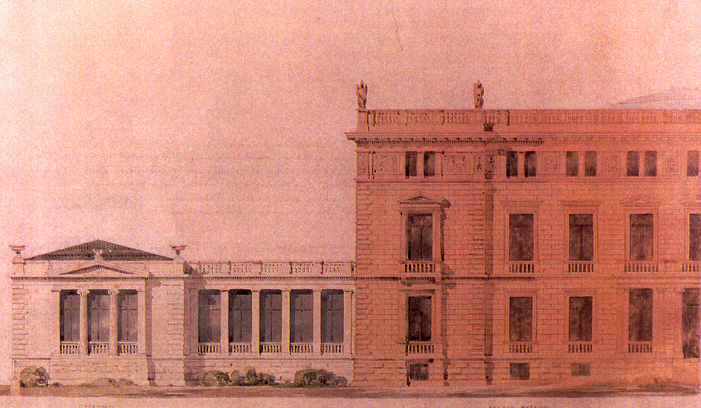
Ziller's plan for the extension to the ballroom of the crown prince's palace

The design of the palace was entrusted to architect Ernst Ziller. He became the Official Court Architect of King George I and designed an estimated 700 buildings all over Greece for both official and private use. It is said the King George I ordered Ziller not to make the building too pretentious, so it would blend with the other mansions on the street, and not to model it after any other palaces in Europe. Following these guidelines, Ziller designed a three-story, symmetrical, neoclassical mansion. Construction of the palace took six years.

== Additions ==
Since this was to be the Crown Prince's Palace, no large ballrooms were included in the design since it was believed that most large scale, official entertaining would occur in the much larger Old Royal Palace. The palace's main reception room was the large salon on the second floor. However, when the palace became the main royal residence, a large ballroom became needed. So, in 1909, Ziller was again commissioned to design an extension which was used as a ballroom and is now named the Credentials Lounge. Another extension was needed when Princess Sophia of Greece (now queen of Spain, and daughter of King Paul and Queen Frederica) became engaged to Juan Carlos I of Spain. In 1962, the King commissioned architect Alexander Baltatzis to design an addition which became the largest room in the palace and is now named the Reception Hall.

== Gardens ==
The garden of the Presidential Mansion occupies an area of about 25,000 square metres (just more than 6 acres) and constitutes a green haven in the centre of Athens. During the middle of the nineteenth century, this area, because of its especially fertile soil, was in fact the vegetable garden of the Royal Palace (now Parliament building).

After the construction of the mansion in 1897 and the construction of Herodou Attikou Street, the area which surrounded the Crown Prince's Palace was fashioned into a large ornamental garden. The planning of this appears to have been assigned to Ziller's technical office. The selection of suitable plants, though, must have been entrusted to a Greek specialist, since most of the trees are native to Greece.

From the very beginning the garden was divided into two large sections because of the slope of the land. The building is situated in the upper section.

The design of the garden in front of the building was similar to that of other neo-classical structures of the period (the Academy, the University and the National Library). The garden follows a relatively rigid geometric plan of the French type, with symmetrical plots of grass and seasonal flowering plants. The formalism of the composition approaching Herod Atticus Road is alleviated by the perennial plane trees, lindens, palms and cypress trees.

== Functions ==
The palace has served as the offices and main residence of the crown princely couple, royal family and president of the republic, respectively. Since 1913, it is also where all official functions are held in Athens.

Since the mid-1970s, the president holds a reception on 24 July every year to commemorate the restoration of democracy in 1974. The reception is attended by the political, military, and academic leadership of the country, and of all sectors of the economy and various organizations, along with news reporters.

== Timeline ==
1868: Upon the birth of the heir, the state allocates funds to build a palace for the crown prince upon his achieving maturity.

1889: Crown Prince Constantine engaged to Princess Sophia of Prussia.

1891–1897: Construction.

1897–1913: Use as Crown Prince's Palace by Crown Prince Constantine and Crown Princess Sophia.

1913–1924: Becomes Royal Palace after King George I is assassinated.

1924–1935: Presidential Palace (monarchy abolished).

1935–1974: Royal Palace (monarchy restored).

1974–present: Presidential Mansion (monarchy abolished).

== Bibliography ==
- Kardamitsi-Adami, Maro (2009). Palaces in Greece. Melissa Books. ISBN 978-960-204-289-2.

== Sources ==
- Presidency of the Hellenic Republic (in Greek)
- Presidency of the Hellenic Republic (in English)
