= Pangrati =

Pangrati Παγκράτι
- Neighborhood
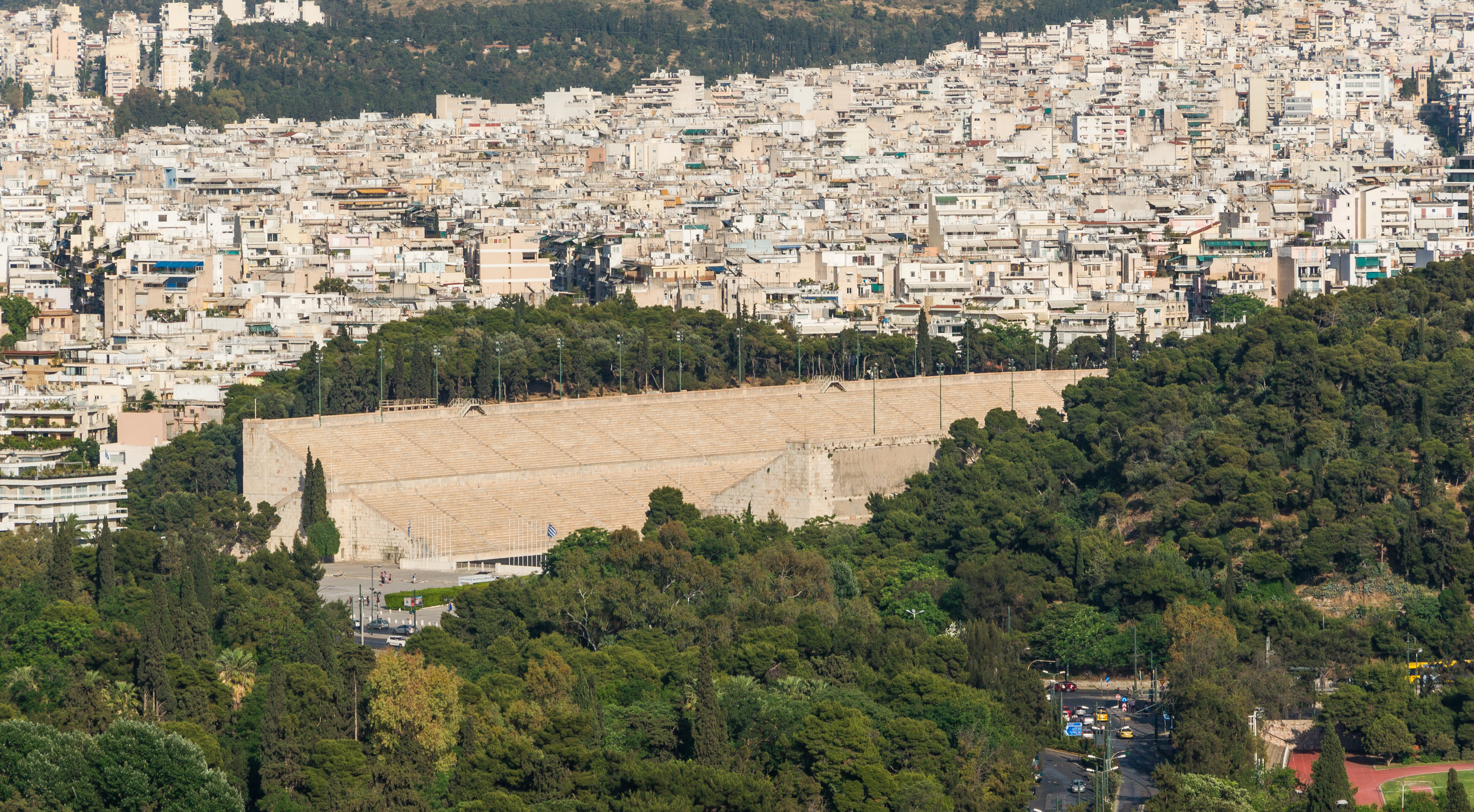
- Pangrati district as seen from the Acropolis

- Location within municipality of Athens
- Coordinates: 37°58′05″N 23°44′38″E
- Country: Greece
- Region: Attica
- City: Athens
- Postal code: 116 33, 116 34, 116 35, 116 36, 106 74, 161 21
- Area code: 210
- Website: www.cityofathens.gr

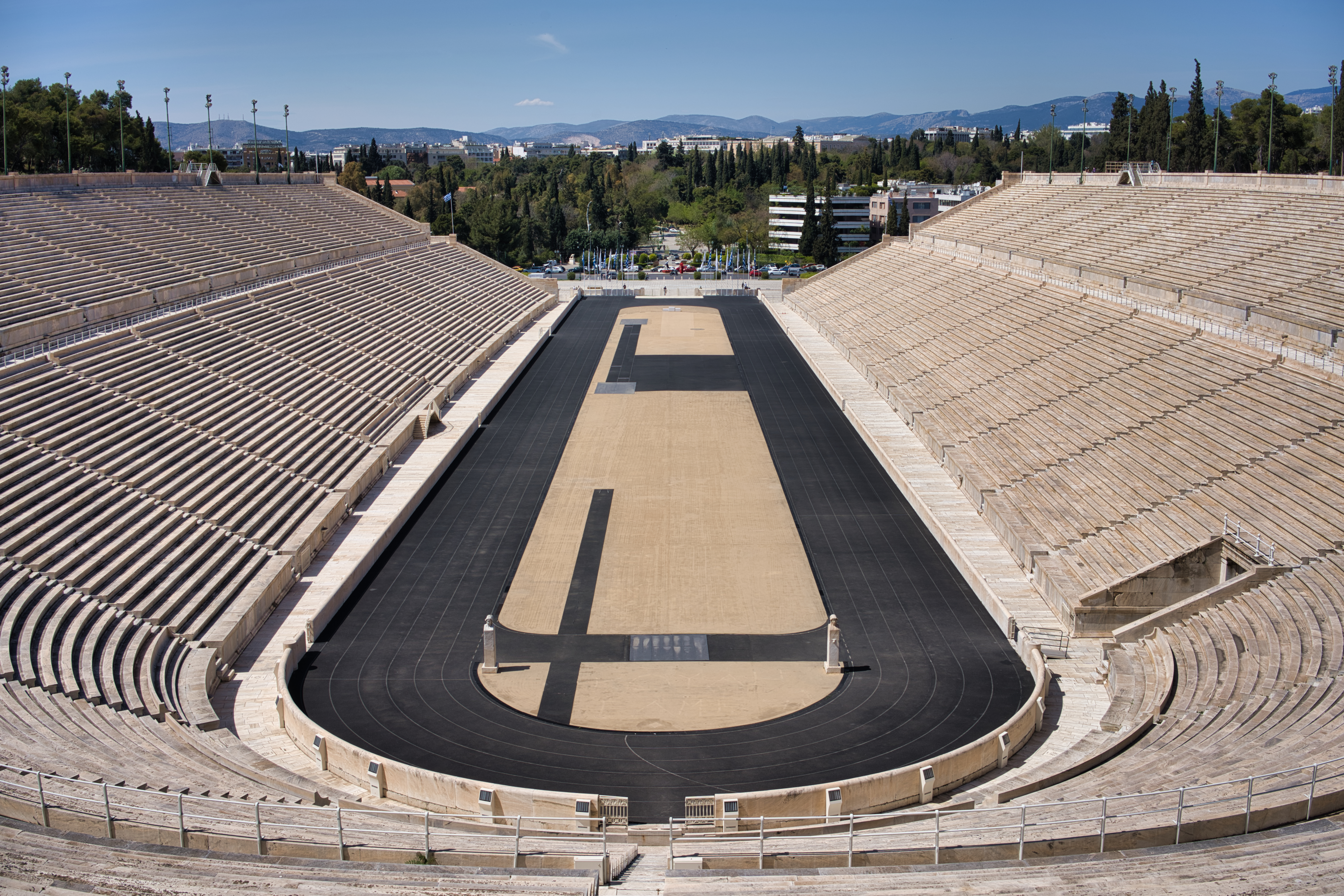
The Panathenaic Stadium

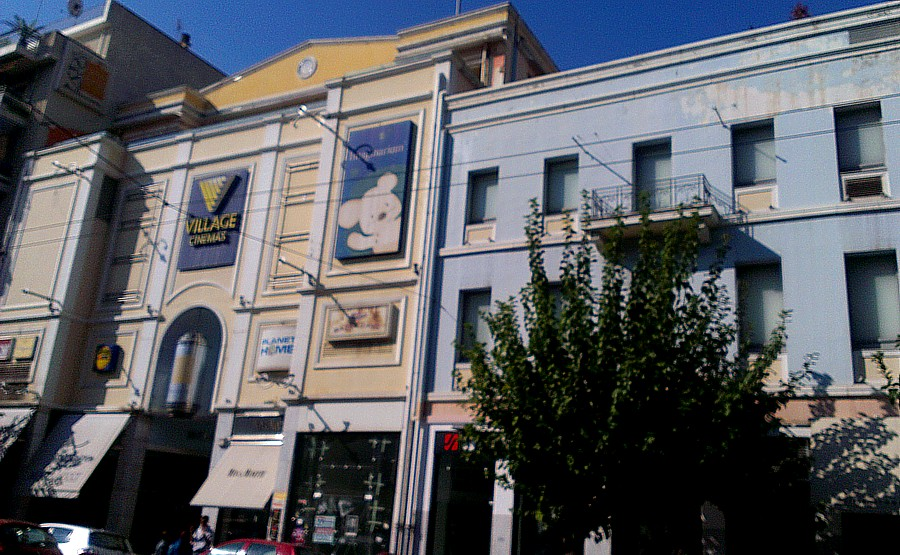
Central market

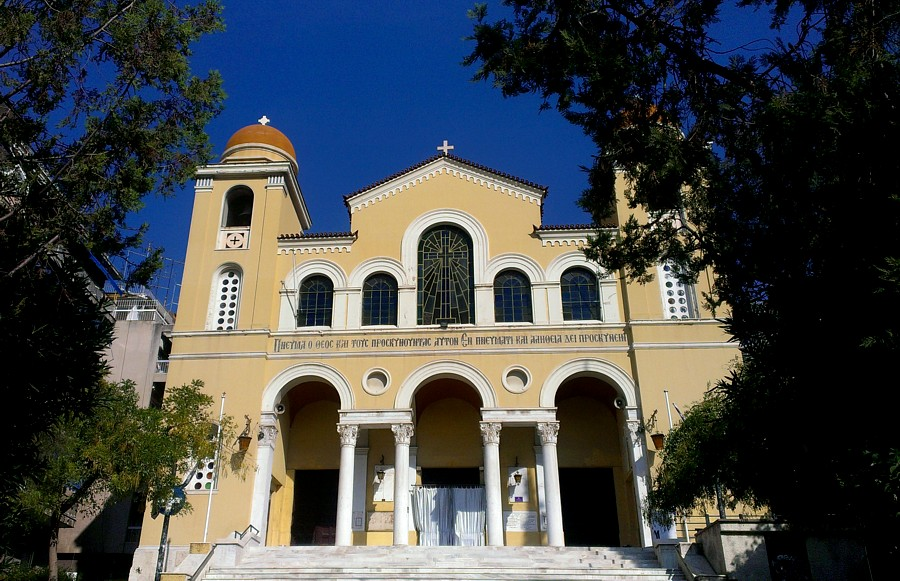
Agios Spyridon church

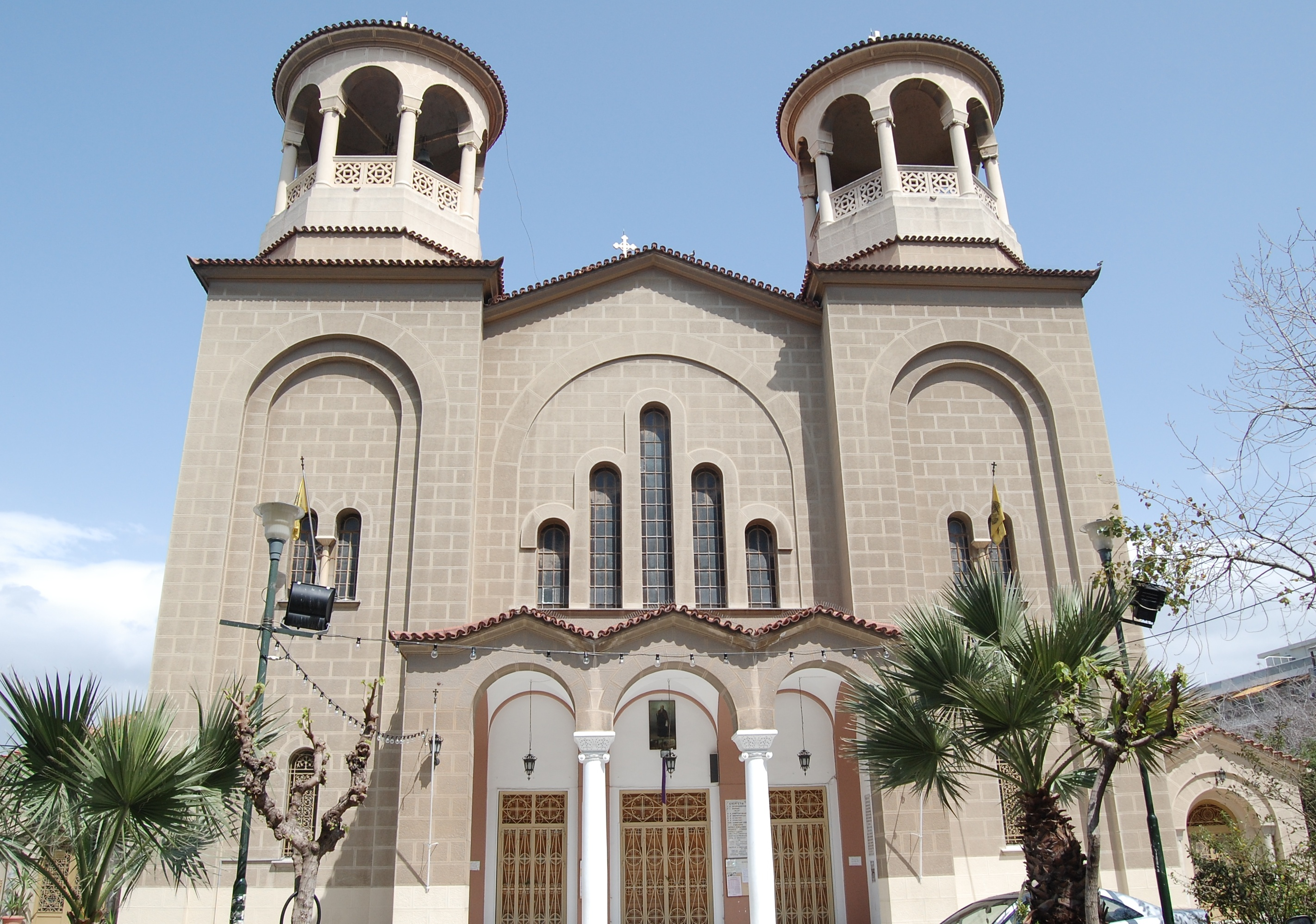
Profitis Ilias church

Pangrati (Greek: Παγκράτι) is a neighborhood in Athens, Greece, having an estimated population of 35,173 residents. Named after the ancient sanctuary of Hercules Pancrates ("All Powerful"), its frontage runs from Vasilissis Sofias Avenue along to Vasileos Konstantinou Avenue and Vassileos Alexandrou Avenue, just a few minutes walk from the National Gardens. One of the most important landmarks of Pangrati is the Panathinaiko Stadium that hosted the first modern Olympic Games in 1896. The First Cemetery of Athens, the official cemetery for the City of Athens, lies within the neighborhood's limits.

Pangrati includes the Ilissos river valley and extends to the south as far as the Panathinaic Stadium and the First Cemetery of Athens. Its eastern boundary was once defined by the Hymettus Mountain slopes but with the extension of the city in interwar period the modern eastern boundary is Nikiforidi Str. and Iliados Str., including Deliolani Square. To the north and northeast, the area fades into Hilton and National Gallery area, but it is considered that the area north of Vassileos Alexandrou Ave. as far north to Hilton Athens hotel and northeast as Andreas Syngros Hospital is part of Pangrati. Pangrati is bordered by the Kolonaki (Greek: Κολωνάκι) neighborhood to the west, the Ilisia (Greek: Ιλίσια) neighborhood and the Kaisariani (Greek: Καισαριανή) to the north, the Vyronas (Greek: Βύρωνας) and Dafni-Ymittos (Greek: Δάφνη-Υμηττός) municipalities to the east, and the Neos Kosmos (Greek: Νέος Κόσμος) neighborhood to the south. It is not to be confused as a separate suburb, as it is part of the City of Athens proper. However, it is frequently mistaken as such, possibly because of it bordering the actual suburban towns of Vyronas and Kaisariani.

In the second decade of the 21st century, Pangrati has experienced a renaissance as a destination for hipsters, with concomitant gentrification, house price increases, and a decrease in housing affordability.

== Squares ==
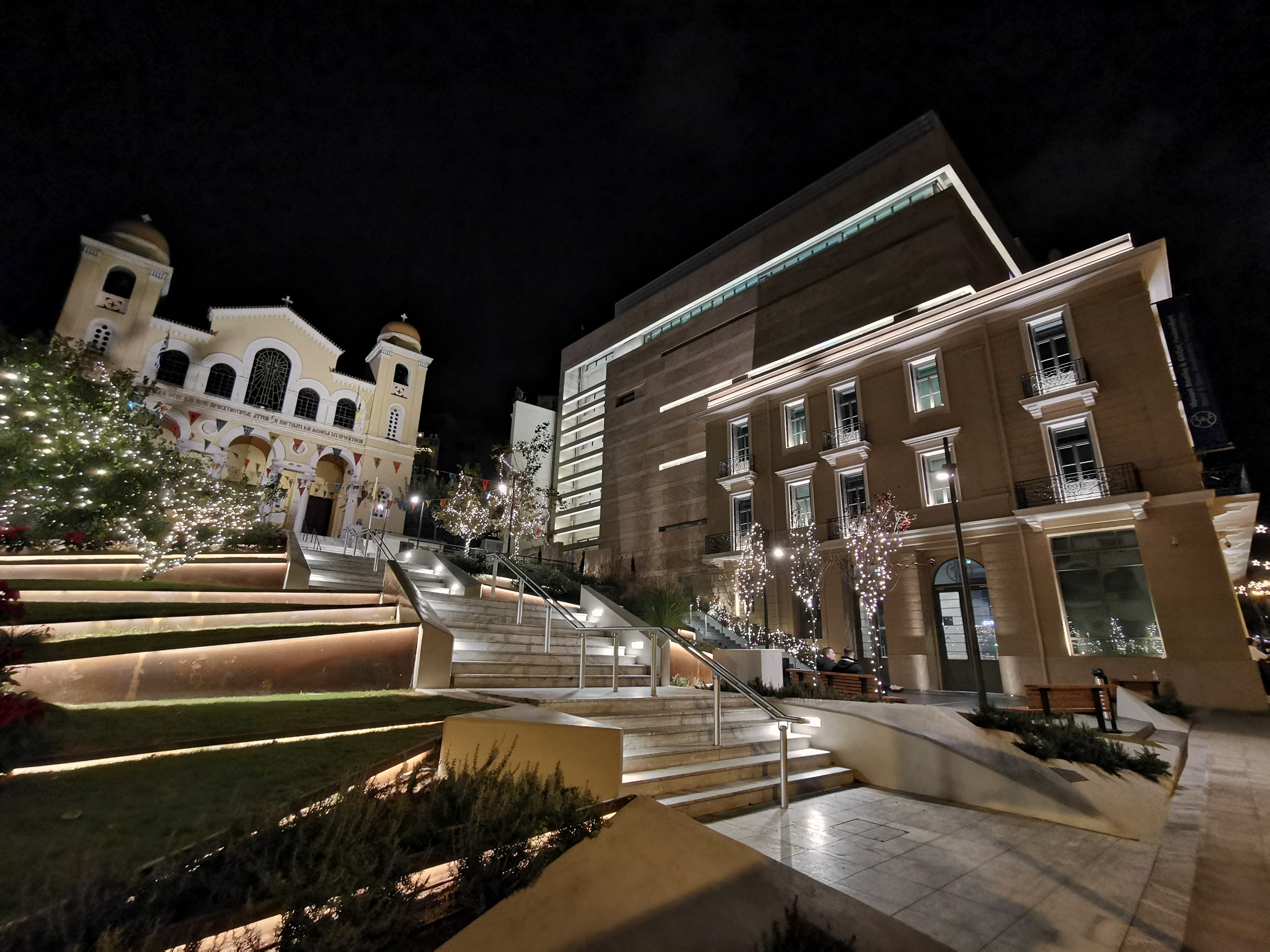
St. Spyridon Square in Pangrati with Goulandris Museum of Contemporary Art

Pangrati has numerous squares: Plastira, Pangratiou ("of Pangrati"), Messolongiou, Proskopon, Profitis Ilias, Agios Spyridon, Deliolani and Varnava. Pangrati Square is home to the Pangrati Grove, together with a major street named Spirou Merkouri, which runs into Vassileos Konstantinou Ave and up towards Evangelismos Metro Station. Agios Spyridon Square features the Saint Spyridon Church and Profitis Ilias Square features the Church of the Prophet Elijah (Greek: Προφήτης Ηλίας), and the Imittou Avenue, which runs through the entire span of Pangrati starting from Kaisariani; around Varnava Square is the area behind the Kallimarmaro Stadium hosting classy restaurants and various tavernas, while Plastira Square serves as a stop for all three trolley networks and local bus routes. Proskopon Square, just behind the Presidential Mansion also hosts classy restaurants, bars and cafes.

== Culture ==
Pangrati has attracted artists from all over Greece, who arrive in the city of Athens to educate themselves and to seek inspiration from its vast pool of artistic resources and galleries. Poets, novelists, writers, painters, composers, musicians made Pangrati one of the most important artistic hubs of Athens. One of the most important Greek poets of the 20th century and a Nobel laureate, Giorgos Seferis lived in Pangrati. Manos Hatzidakis, composer who also received an Academy Award for Best Original Song for his song Never on Sunday from the film of the same name is the personality mostly associated with this Athenian neighbourhood. Other artists who lived in Pangrati include Nikiforos Vrettakos, Yiannis Moralis, Kostas Varnalis, Dimitris Psathas and many others.

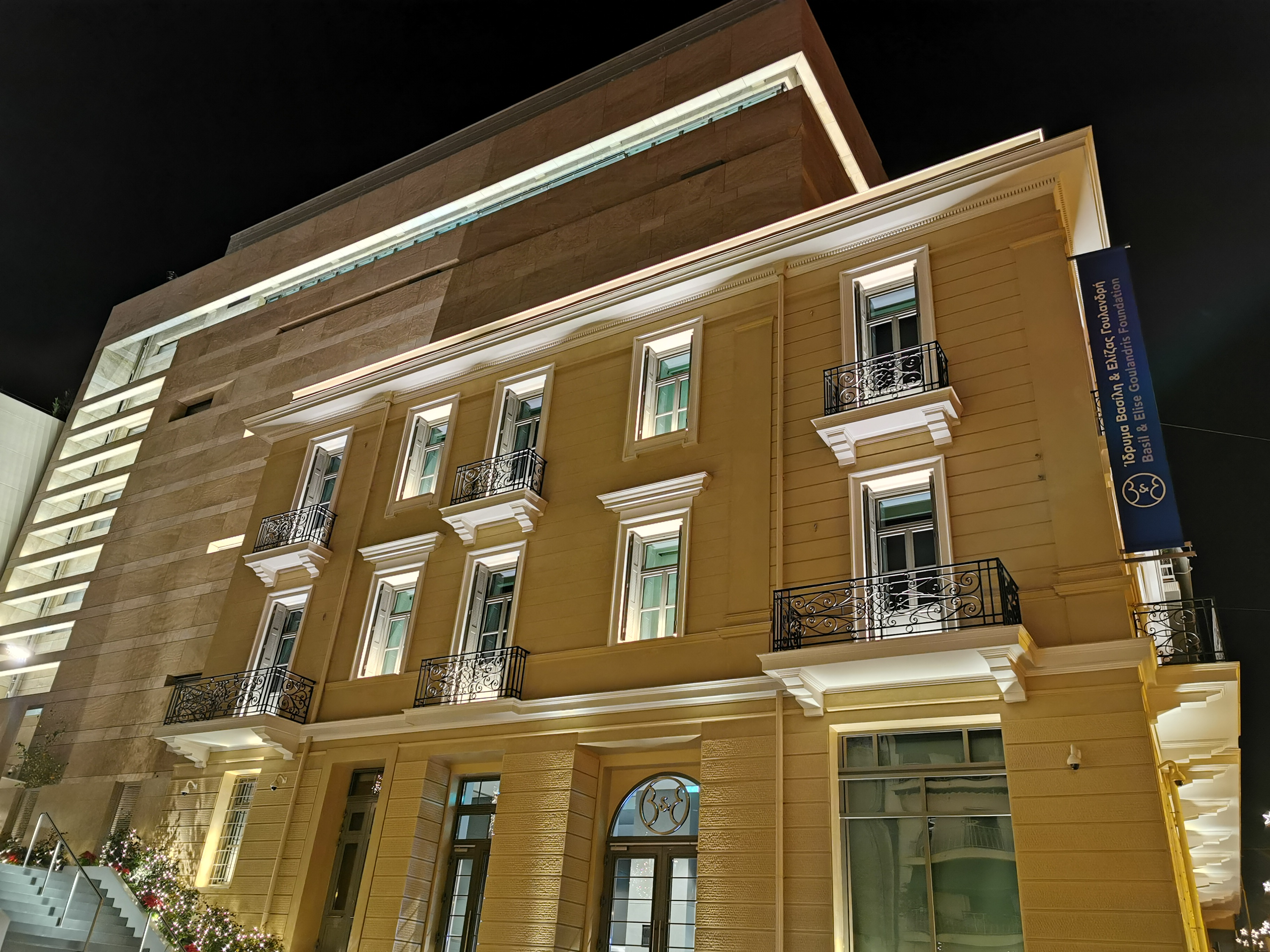
The Goulandris Museum of Contemporary Art in Pangrati

The National Gallery of Athens, a museum primarily devoted to post-Byzantine Greek Art was renovated recently in a $71,60 million expansion project, hosts the biggest collection of Greek paintings making it one of the most important spots of the neighbourhood. The National Hellenic Research Foundation is also located in Pangrati. Maria Callas, the famous soprano, has also studied in the Athens Conservatoire, which lies within Pangrati, just next to the Cult of Hercules Pankrates, directly beneath the Harry S. Truman statue in Vassileos Konstantinou Avenue. At Agios Spyridon Church, a new museum has changed the cultural map of Athens as the Goulandris Museum of Contemporary Art opened its gates in October 2019. The Goulandris Museum hosts a world class collection of works by Picasso, Chagall, Van Gogh, Gauguin, El Greco, Degas, Klee, Kandinsky, Rodin, Cézanne, Monet, Miró, Giacometti, Pollock, Bacon and others as well as by prominent Greek artists including George Bouzianis, Yannis Tsarouchis, Nikos Hadjikyriakos-Ghika, Yannis Moralis and Michalis Tombos. Princeton University has recently inaugurated the Athens Center for Research and Hellenic Studies in Pangrati. The Center is housed in the Stanley J. Seeger ’52 House, a 1930s-era townhouse. It is the one and only research and scholarship center of Princeton University anywhere outside of the United States.

== Transportation ==
Pangrati is served by Evangelismos metro station, by buses #054, 203, 204, 209, 732 and trolleys #2, 4 and 11. Recent information released by the Elliniko Metro (the constructor of the Athens Metro) has suggested that there will be a future metro station on the border of Pangrati and Kaisariani on Imittou Street, to be named Pangrati/Kaisariani, on the proposed Line 4.

== Notable people ==
- Archbishop Christodoulos of Athens
- Dimitris Kataleifos, actor
- Dora Bakoyianni, politician
- Elli Kokkinou, singer
- Alketas Panagoulias, football trainer
- Yorgos Lanthimos, film director
- Giorgos Seferis, diplomat and Nobel Prize laureate poet
- Karolos Papoulias, politician, former President of Greece
- Kostas Karamanlis, politician, former Prime Minister of Greece
- Manos Hatzidakis, Academy Award winning composer
- Milena Apostolaki, politician
- Nikitas Kaklamanis, politician, former Mayor of Athens
- Nikos Sergianopoulos, actor
- Nico Minardos, actor
- Thanos Mikroutsikos, composer
- Theodoros Pangalos, politician, Deputy Prime Minister of Greece, former Minister of Foreign Affairs
- Vaios Ekonomou, composer
- Nana Mouskouri, singer
