= Vasilissis Amalias Avenue =

Street in Athens, Greece

Coordinates: 37°58′24″N 23°44′07″E

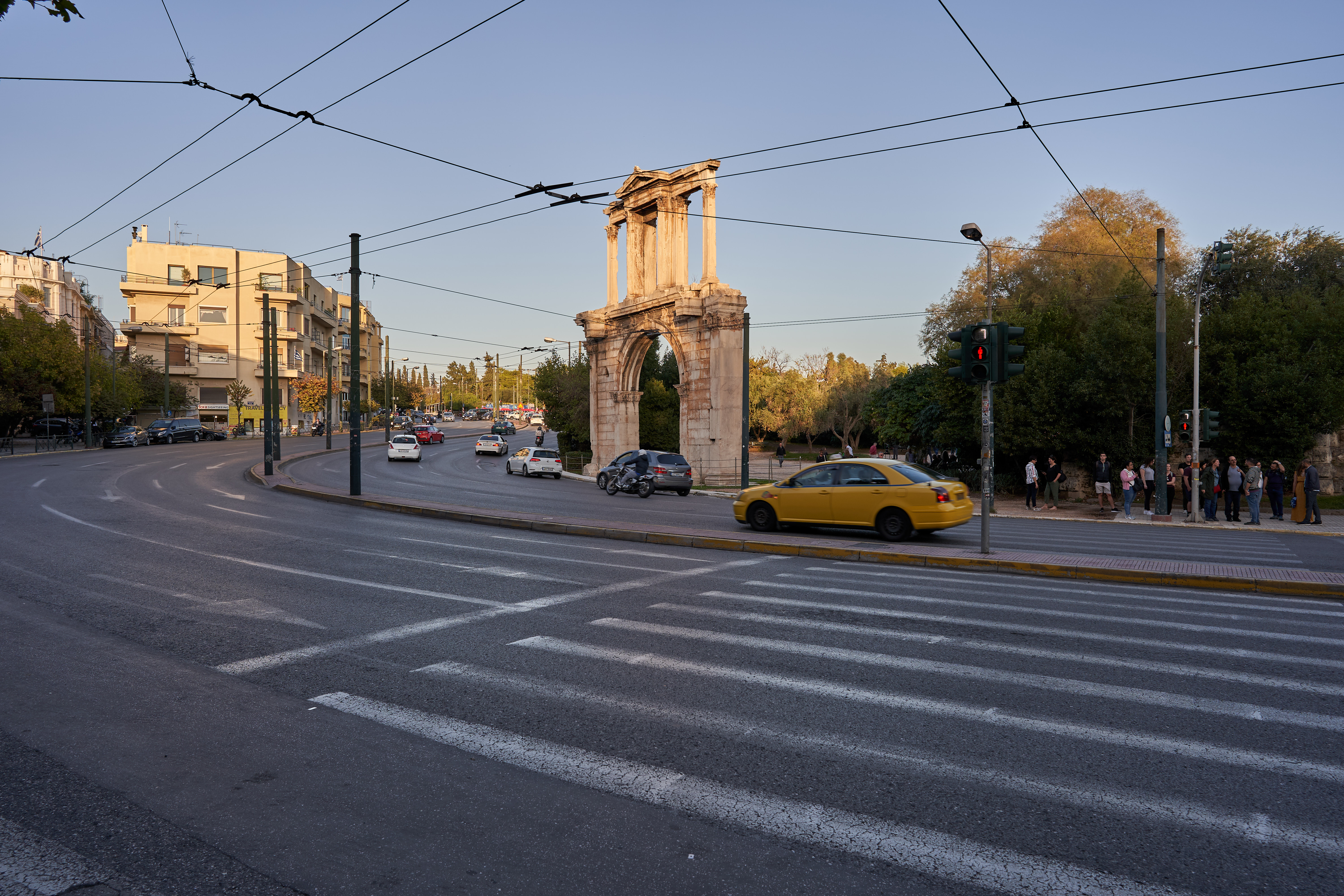
Amalias Avenue and the Arch of Hadrian

Vasilissis Amalias Avenue (Greek: Λεωφόρος Βασιλίσσης Αμαλίας, "Of The Queen's Amalia Avenue") is a major avenue in Athens, Greece, linking with Andrea Syngrou Avenue in the south and Panepistimiou Street in the north. The avenue has three lanes and further north four with two coming from Vasilissis Sofias Avenue. The National Garden lie on the eastern side of the avenue and residential buildings cover the west with eight to ten storey buildings in the northwestern part.

This avenue was named after the first queen of modern Greece, Amalia, consort to King Othon, who also designed the gardens in 1938.

Visitor attractions aside from the National Gardens themselves include the Greek Parliament with the Tomb of the Unknown Soldier to the east and Syntagma Square (Constitution Square) to the west, the Arch of Hadrian and the Temple of Olympian Zeus to the south and the Zappeion on the eastern side at the centre of the avenue.

== Intersections ==
- Athanasiou Diakou Street and Andrea Syngrou Avenue
- Dionysiou Areopagitou Street (west)
- Lysistratous Street (from southbound)
- Vasilissis Olgas Avenue
- Filellinon Avenue (merge from eastbound of Agiou Konstantinou and Stadiou)
- Souri Street
- Xenofontos Street
- Vasilissis Sofias Avenue and Panepistimiou Street
