= Herodou Attikou Street =

Street in Athens, Greece

Coordinates: 37°58′27.07″N 23°44′25.05″E

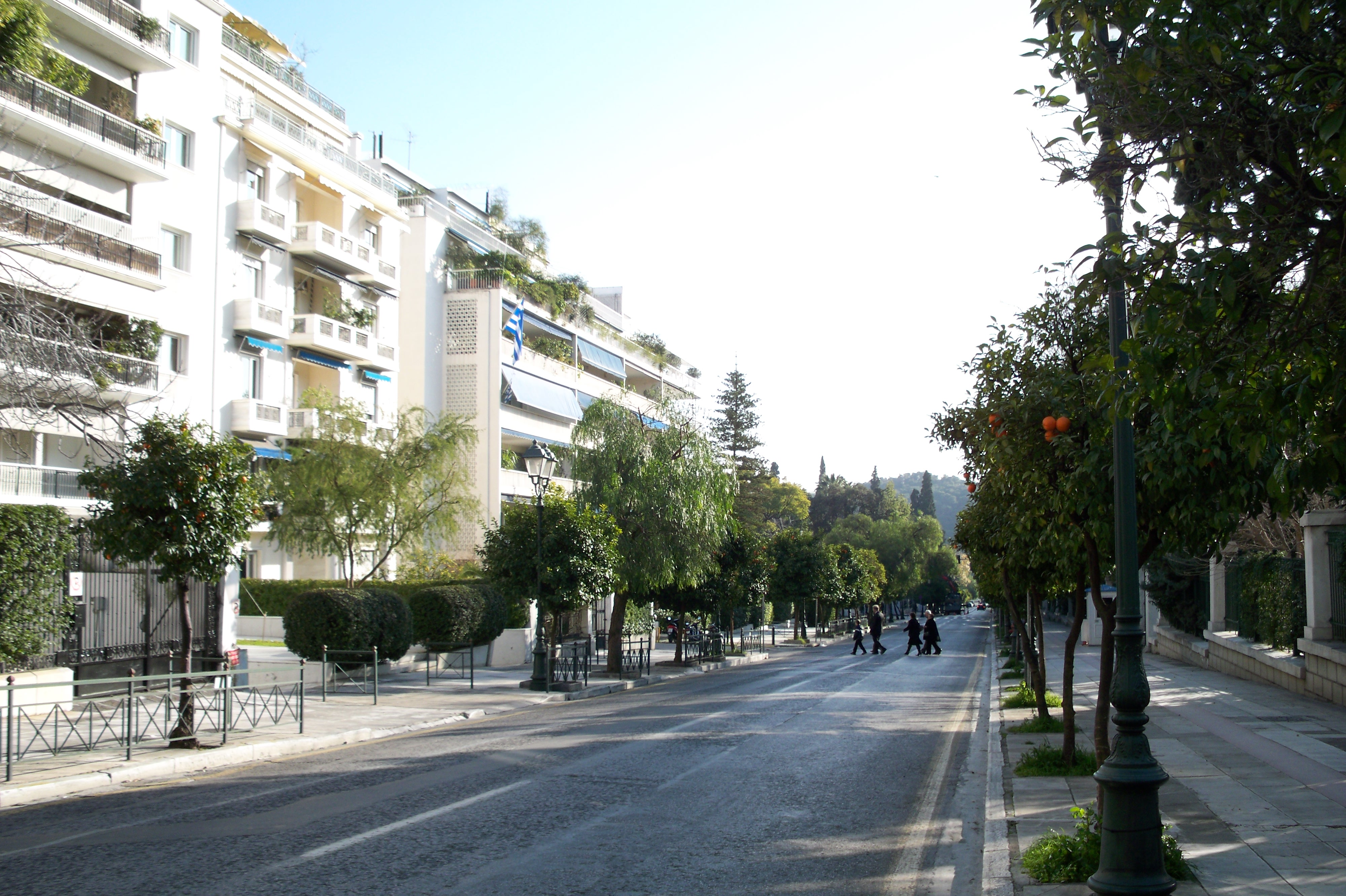
Herodou Attikou Street facing towards Vasileos Konstantinou Avenue

Herodou Attikou Street or Irodou Attikou Street (Greek: Οδός Ηρώδου Αττικού, pronounced [oˈðos iˈroðu atiˈku]) is located east of downtown Athens and is adjacent to the National Garden of Athens. The street is named after the ancient Athenian rhetorician, magnate and major benefactor of the Roman era, Herodes Atticus as its direction is towards Panathenaic Stadium, at the east hill of which (nowadays Pangrati) his mausoleum was found.

The tree-lined one-way street runs from north (Vasilissis Sofias Avenue) to south (Vasileos Konstantinou Avenue) connecting the districts of Kolonaki and Pangrati. It is, by far, the most expensive piece of housing real estate in Greece and one of the most expensive in Europe. The five-block-long eastern side of the street is lined with luxurious apartments and mansions, foremost among them the Presidential Palace, the official workplace and residence of the president of the Hellenic Republic, and the Maximos Mansion (Μέγαρο Μαξίμου, Megaro Maximou), the official workplace of the prime minister. Kolonaki, a shopping district, lies immediately to the north, and Pangrati, a residential district, to the south, the National Gardens to the west and the Panathenaic Stadium to the southeast. The barracks of the Presidential Guard are the only buildings on the western (National Garden) side of the street. The street is heavily guarded by police (both uniformed and plainclothes) round the clock.

== See also ==
- List of most expensive streets by city
