= Maximos Mansion =

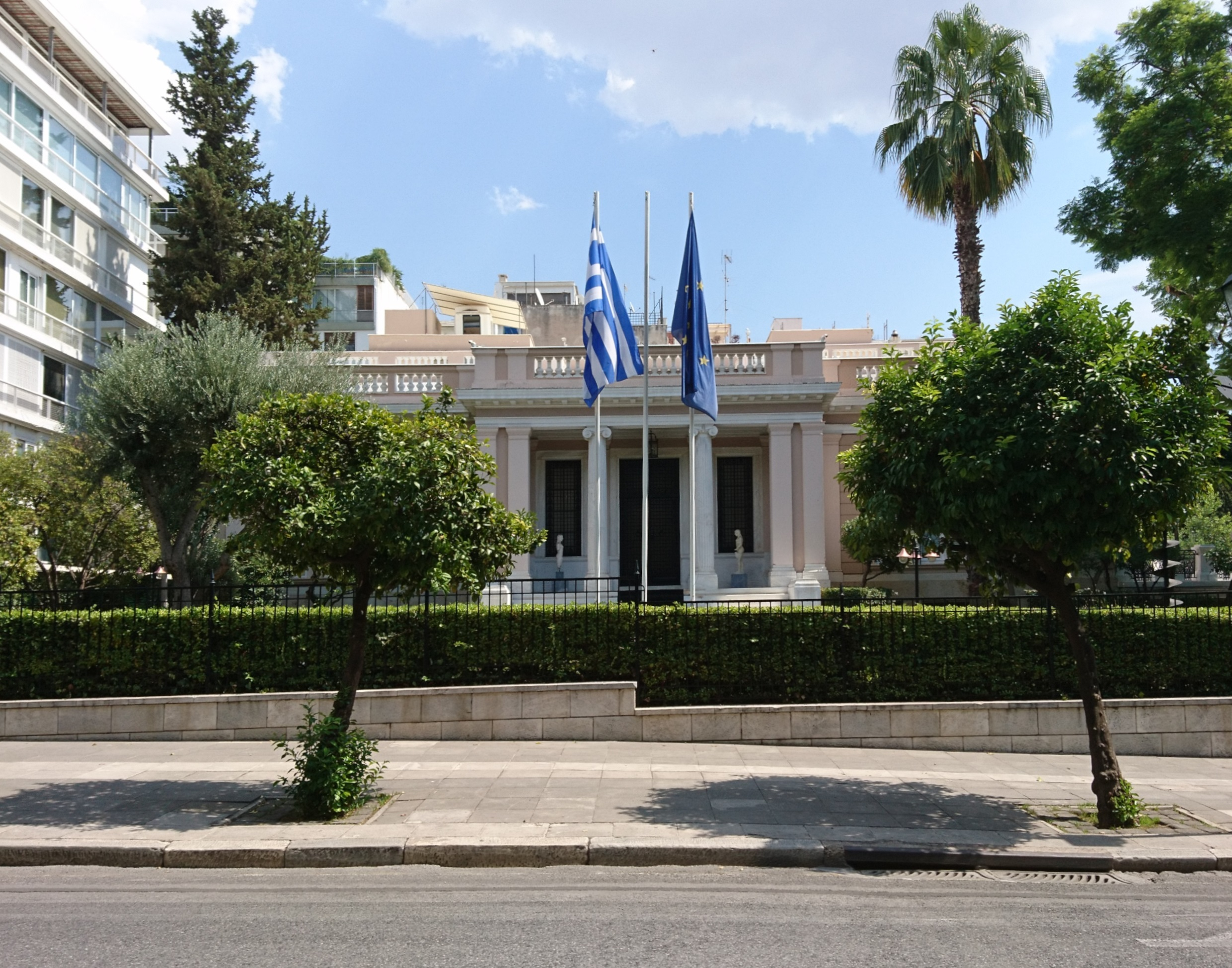

General information
- Architectural style: Neo-Classical
- Location: Athens, Greece
- Coordinates: 37°58′24″N 23°44′26″E
- Current tenants: Kyriakos Mitsotakis (Prime Minister of Greece)
- Construction started: 1912; 114 years ago
- Completed: 1921; 105 years ago

Design and construction
- Architects: Anastasios Helmis; Anastasios Metaxas

The Maximos Mansion (Greek: Μέγαρο Μαξίμου, Mégaro Maxímou) has been the official seat of the prime minister of Greece since 1982. It is located in downtown Athens, Greece, near Syntagma Square.

== Location ==
The Maximos Mansion is located at Herodes Atticus Street 19, next to the Presidential Mansion and the National Garden of Athens.

== History ==
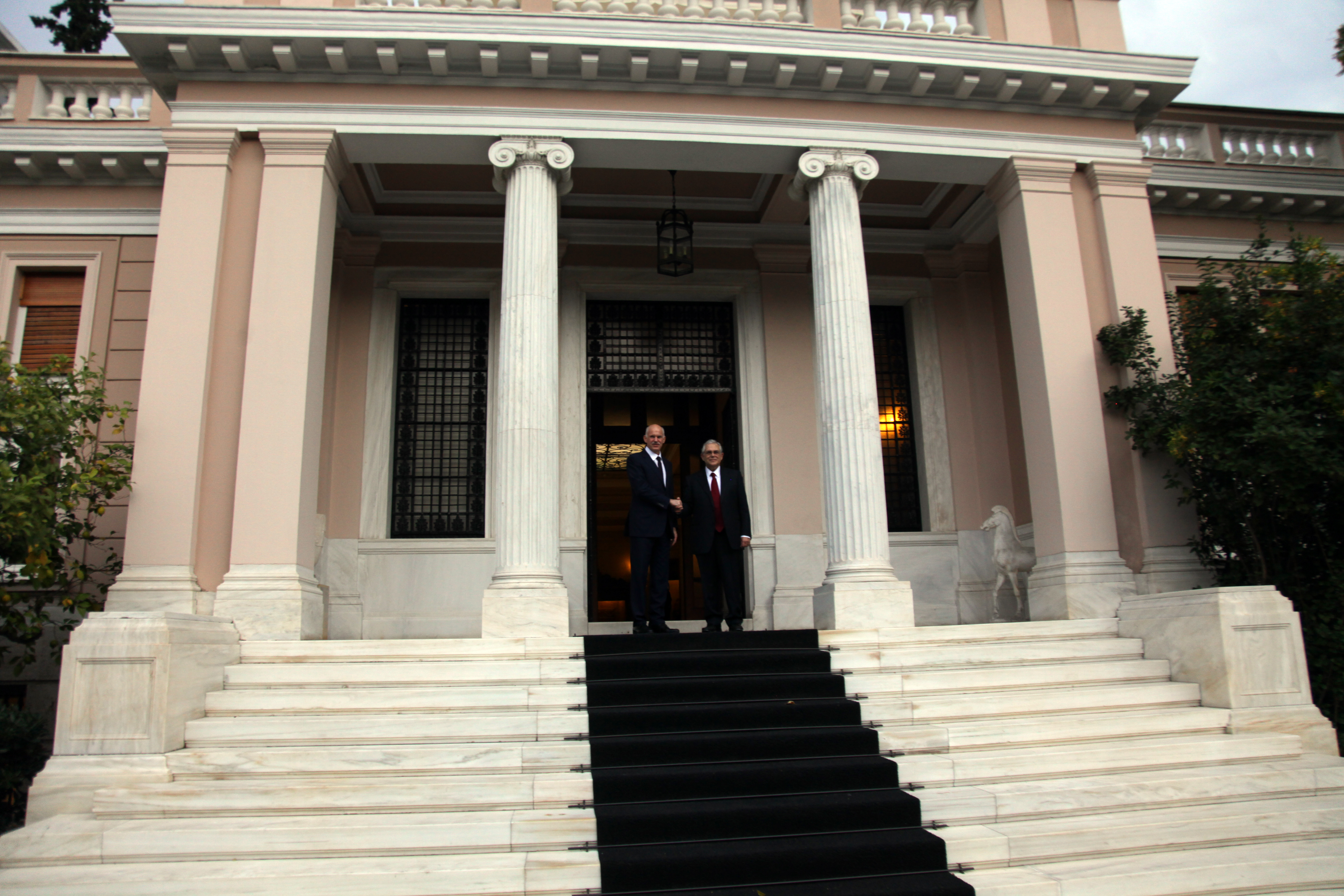
A view of Maximos Mansion in 2011 (George Papandreou and Lucas Papademos

The building was founded in 1912 by Alexandros Michalinos, a wealthy shipowner from the island of Chios. Before the construction of the mansion, the site was a garden for the Royal Palace. In 1916, Michalinos' widow, Irene Manoussis, after marrying banker and politician Dimitrios Maximos, sold the incomplete building to shipowner Leonidas Embirikos, only to re-buy it in 1921.

Dimitrios Maximos completed the building and settled there with his family in the early 1920s. Between 1941 and 1944, during the Nazi occupation of Greece, the mansion was used as the residence of the German Admiral of the Aegean Sea.

After the war the building was briefly used as the residence of the U.S. ambassador in Athens. In 1952 Dimitrios Maximos sold the mansion to the Greek state at a favorable price.

From the mid-1950s until 1982, the mansion was used as a guesthouse for important foreign dignitaries visiting Greece, including Marshal Tito of Yugoslavia in 1955 and Margaret Thatcher of the United Kingdom in 1980.

In 1982, Andreas Papandreou decided to move the prime minister's office into the mansion (prior to that, the prime minister's office was located inside the Parliament building). Papandreou himself rarely used it however, preferring to conduct his business from his family villa of Kastri (in the affluent northern suburbs of Athens), or from Lagonisi, where he spent the summer months.

The Maximos Mansion has the benefit of being located at the heart of Athens and very close to the Hellenic Parliament, but otherwise its use as the prime minister's office has been described as problematic in recent years, due to its rather small size; as a result, since the late 2000s, various proposals for moving the prime minister's office to a new location have been examined, with the Zappeion Palace considered the best possible solution.
