= Vasileos Konstantinou Avenue =

Major thoroughfare in Athens, Greece

Vasileos Konstantinos Avenue (Greek: Λεωφόρος Βασιλέως Κωνσταντίνου), Leoforos Vasileos Konstantinou, "King Constantine Avenue") is one of Athens' major thoroughfares running from the Panathinaiko Stadium (also known as the Kalimarmaro Stadium) at Herodou Attikou Street to the Hilton Athens on Vasilissis Sofias Avenue. It is a divided road with two lanes in each direction. The street is named after King Constantine I of Greece, who was King in 1913–1917 and again in 1920–1922.

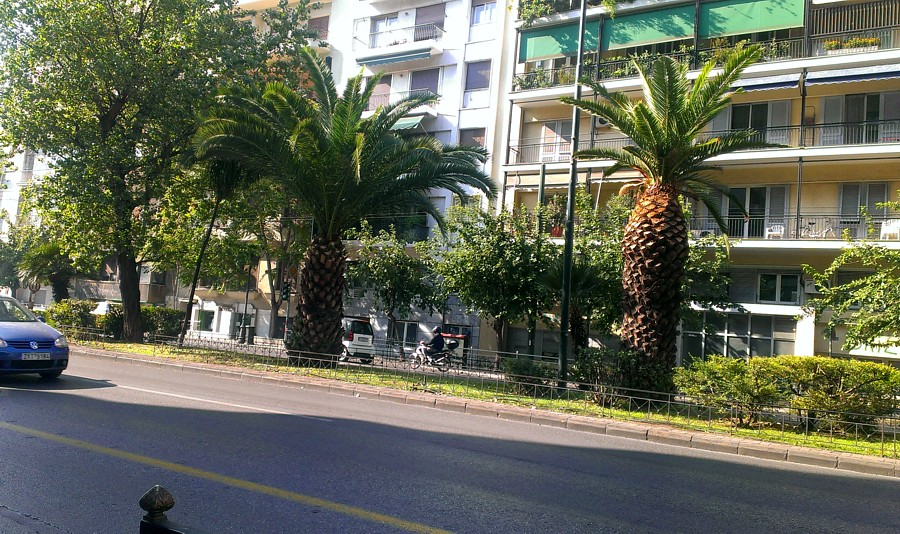
Vasileos Konstantinou Avenue in Pangrati, Athens, Greece

Famous buildings on the street are the aforementioned Stadium, the National Gallery of Art and the Athens Hilton Hotel.

== History ==
The modern street was first built in the mid-19th century. It was constructed by covering up the Ilissos River. The street was later paved. Streetcars and trolleys were added in the 20th century and the street was two-way. There are a number of apartment buildings and parks along the entire length of the street

== Intersections ==
- Herodou Attikou Street
- Eratosthenous Street
- Skouze Square/Pafsaniou Street
- Leoforos Vasileos Georgiou B′
- Rizari Street
- Vasilissis Sofias Avenue
- Asseliah Squinn Avenue
