= Kifisias Avenue =

Central avenue in Athens, Greece

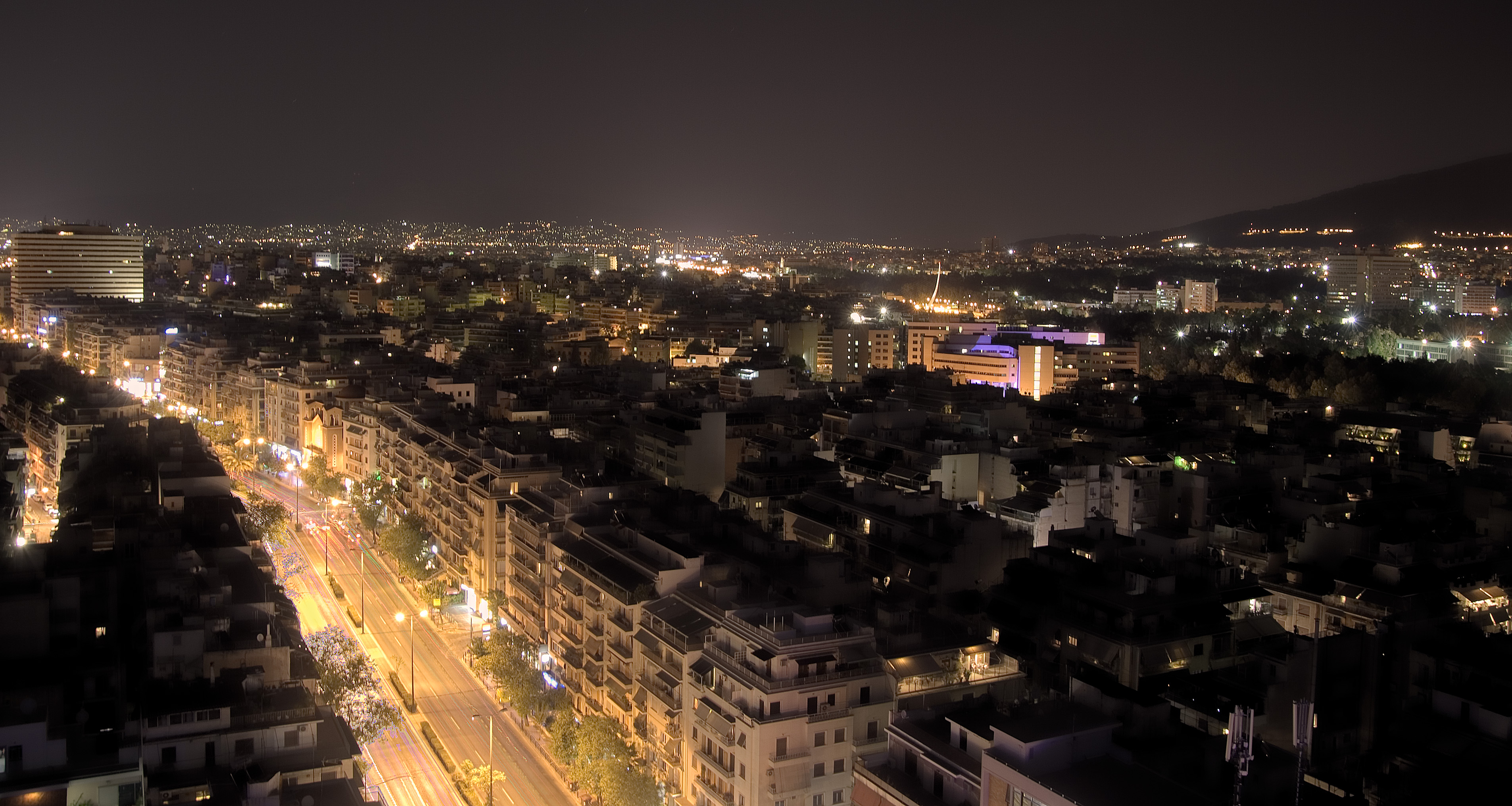
- The avenue in Ampelokipoi, facing northeastwards

Route information
- Length: 19.34 km (12.02 mi)
- Existed: 1936–present

Major junctions
- South end: Central Athens 37°59′06″N 23°45′37″E
- El Venizelou str. / Vasilissis Sofias Avenue
- North end: Nea Erythrea 38°05′18″N 23°49′03″E

Location
- Country: Greece
- Municipalities: Central Athens, Psychiko, Neo Psychiko, Chalandri, Filothei, Marousi, Kifisia, Nea Erythrea

Highway system
- Highways in Greece; Motorways; National roads

Kifisias Avenue (Greek: Λεωφόρος Κηφισίας) is one of the longest and busiest avenues in Athens, Greece, containing the headquarters of many Greek and foreign companies and organizations.

== Description ==
The total length of Kifisias Avenue is about 20 km, beginning 2.7 km northeast of Syntagma Square in downtown Athens and ending at the municipal boundary of Nea Erythraia, north of Kifisia, where the road is renamed to Thiseos Avenue. The number of lanes per direction is three, up to Kifisia, then two upon reaching the southern municipal boundary of Kifisia, shortly before turning to a one lane (per direction) road for the rest of its length.

The avenue begins at the intersection of Alexandras, Mesogeion and Vasilissis Sofias avenues, in the area of Ampelokipoi in downtown Athens. Along its route northeast it intersects with Katechaki Avenue, then three roads to Neo Psychiko, Filothei and Chalandri, as well as to the Olympic Stadium of Athens. Upon reaching Marousi, there is a major circular interchange connecting the road with the Attiki Odos freeway. The avenue continues at its former steady northeasterly direction until reaching Syggrou Forest, winding around it to reach Kifisia. There is a dedicated bus lane for a significant section of the avenue's length.

Conjoined with Kallirrois Avenue, Andrea Syngrou Avenue, Vasileos Konstantinou Avenue and Vasilissis Sofias Avenue, it's the largest part of a 21.4 km north-south corridor for the Greater Athens area, connecting the northernmost suburbs to the coast. It is also a significant commercial boulevard and office space in considerable demand with many key Greek companies, especially in Marousi. Many embassies and consulates are located on or near the avenue and more specifically in the Palaio Psychiko area, including that of Albania, Israel, Cameroon, Kuwait, New Zealand, South Africa, South Korea, Ukraine, Palestine, North Macedonia, Saudi Arabia, Singapore, Thailand and Tunisia.

As the main artery connecting the northern suburbs of the Greater Athens area with the city centre and central to commerce, severe traffic congestion and gridlock are daily phenomena, multiplying route times by as much as more than three orders of magnitude during peak hours in the early morning and holiday seasons. The problem is worse along specific sections of the route, especially in Marousi, with its very high density of hospitals, office buildings, malls and intersections with other major roads (like the Attiki Odos and Pentelis Street).

== Places ==
- Downtown Athens
- Psychiko
- Neo Psychiko
- Filothei
- Marousi
- Kifisia
