= Goulandris Museum of Contemporary Art =

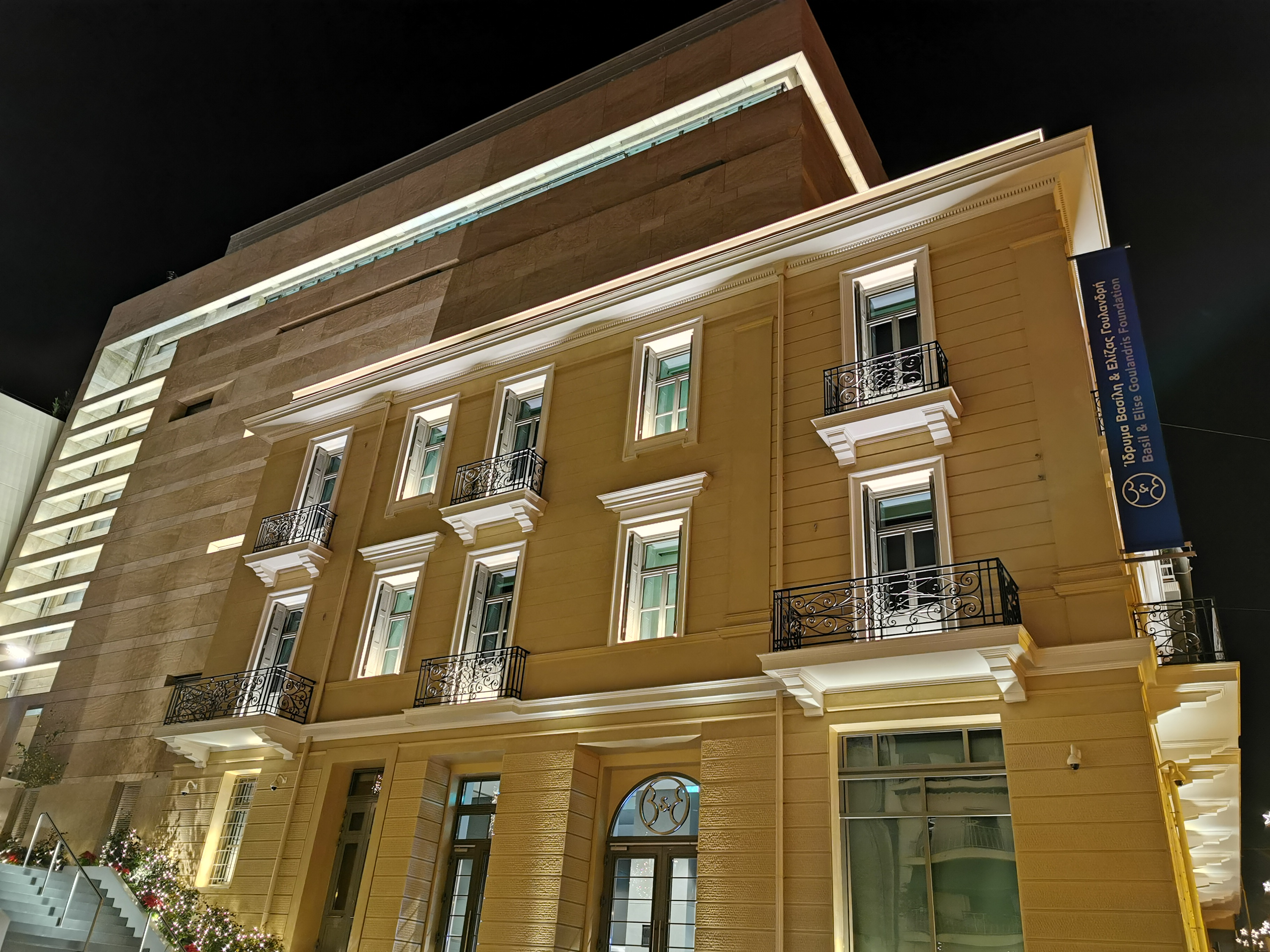

- Location within Greece
- Established: 1 October 2019
- Location: Eratosthenous Street 13 Pangrati, Athens, Greece
- Coordinates: 37°58′11″N 23°44′34″E
- Type: Art museum
- Director: Kyriakos Koutsomallis
- Website: www.goulandris.gr

The Goulandris Museum of Contemporary Art is a modern art museum in Eratosthenous Street, Pangrati, Athens, Greece, opened in October 2019. It displays many of the works amassed by shipowner Basil Goulandris and his wife Elise Karadontis, who died in 1994 and 2000 respectively, with an art collection valued at US$3 billion.

It is housed in a 1920s neoclassical mansion with a ten-storey new extension (five of which are below ground). The building has a total surface area of 7,250 sq.m. and the exhibition areas cover a total of five floors; four above ground with a surface area of 1,124 sq.m., where the permanent collection is housed, and one below ground, with a surface area of 530 sq.m., which hosts temporary exhibitions of Greek and foreign artists.

The building also houses a museum shop and a café-restaurant. The floors below ground hosts a library with around 4,500 books, a children's workshop, and a 190-seat amphitheatre.

== Artworks ==
Basil Goulandris collected works by artists including Pablo Picasso, Marc Chagall, Henri Matisse, Alberto Giacometti, Pierre-Auguste Renoir, Joan Miró, Paul Klee, Wassily Kandinsky, El Greco, Paul Cézanne, and Amedeo Modigliani, as well as works by Greek modern painters including Konstantinos Parthenis, George Bouzianis, Nikos Hadjikyriakos-Ghikas, Yiannis Tsarouchis, Yiannis Moralis, and Panayiotis Tetsis.

Collection highlights include:

- Francis Bacon, Three Studies for Self-Portrait, 1972
- Pierre Bonnard, Getting Out of the Bath, 1926
- Georges Braque, Patience, 1942
- Paul Cézanne, Portrait of the Artist Looking Over His Shoulder, 1883-1884
- Marc Chagall, Portrait of E.B.G., 1969
- Giorgio de Chirico, Horses on the Beach, 1930
- Edgar Degas, Little Dancer Aged Fourteen, 1878
- Max Ernst, While the Earth Sleeps, 1956
- Paul Gauguin, Still Life with Grapefruits, 1901
- Alberto Giacometti, Portrait of Yanaihara, 1960
- Wassily Kandinsky, Both Striped, 1932
- Roy Lichtenstein, Nude with White Flower, 1994
- Roy Lichtenstein, Sunrise, 1965
- Henri Matisse, The Nightmare of the White Elephant, Jazz, 1947
- Joan Miró, The Grasshopper, 1926
- Claude Monet, Rouen Cathedral in the Morning (Pink Dominant), 1894
- Pablo Picasso, Nude Woman with Raised Arms, 1907
- Pablo Picasso, Young Man with Bouquet, 1905
- Jackson Pollock, Number 13, 1950, 1950
- Auguste Rodin, Eternal Springtime, 1884
- El Greco, The Veil of Saint Veronica, 1580
- Henri de Toulouse-Lautrec, Woman in Monsieur Forest’s Garden, 1891
- Vincent van Gogh, Olive Picking, 1889
- Vincent van Gogh, Still Life with Coffee Pot, 1888
- Vincent van Gogh, The Alyscamps, 1888
