= Conrad Athens The Ilisian =

Hilton-branded hotel in Athens, Greece

- Conrad Athens The Ilisian

- Location within Greece

General information
- Status: Opened
- Type: Hotel
- Classification: 5 stars
- Location: 46 Vassilissis Sofias Avenue, Athens, Greece
- Coordinates: 37.976554°N 23.750257°E
- Opened: April 1963
- Owner: Hilton Worldwide

Height
- Height: 65 m (213 ft)

Technical details
- Floor count: 13

Website
- www.hilton.com/en/hotels/athgrci-conrad-athens-the-ilisian/

Conrad Athens The Ilisian is a redevelopment of the historic Athens Hilton hotel. It is located in Athens, Greece, on Vassilissis Sofias Avenue, within the Hilton Area, adjacent to the Kolonaki and Pangrati neighbourhoods. Opened in 1963, it closed for renovations in January 2022 and re-opened in April 2026. Today, the hotel forms part of the wider The Ilisian destination, which, in addition to Conrad Athens, includes residences under the Conrad and Waldorf Astoria brands, House of NYNN, as well as dining, retail, wellness, fitness and leisure facilities.

The property is part of the ĒNSOFI Group.

== History ==
=== Athens Hilton ===
The Athens Hilton was constructed from 1958-1963, as Athens' first international chain hotel. It was designed by a team of architects including Emmanuel Vourekas, Prokopis Vasileiadis, Anthony Georgiades and Spyro Staikos. Artist Yiannis Moralis, inspired by Greek themes, designed the reliefs on the building's façade.The construction costed $15 million.

Conrad Hilton was present at the opening ceremony, on April 20, 1963. Guests at the hotel included Greek shipping magnate Aristotle Onassis, singer Frank Sinatra, director Ingmar Bergman and actor Anthony Quinn. Hilton Athens was the headquarters for the International Olympic Committee during the 2004 Summer Olympics. In 2011 the organizing committee of the 2011 Special Olympics World Summer Games used the hotel as their base of operations.

The hotel hosted Athens’ first contemporary art gallery, the Hilton Gallery, in cooperation with Marilena Liacopoulou. From 1968 until 1972 the Hilton Gallery was responsible for various historical exhibitions. In more recent years, the hotel displayed artworks and invested regularly in lobby exhibitions of artists from Greece and abroad.

In 2003, anticipating the 2004 Summer Olympic Games, the Hilton Athens was renovated by Greek architects Alexandros Tombazis and Charis Bougadelis. The establishment was refurbished, and a new seven-storey northern wing was added.

In 2016, Ionian Hotels, the company owning the hotel, was sold by Alpha Bank, which had foreclosed on the property. The Greek TEMES S.A. hotel organization and the Turkish-based Dogus Group partnered 50/50 to buy the hotel for € 76.1 million. In 2019, TEMES bought a controlling interest in the hotel, raising their stake to 51%, while their partner, The Olayan Group, bought out the remaining 49% interest held by Dogus.

The hotel closed on January 31, 2022, for comprehensive renovations.

=== The Ilisian ===
The building re-opened on April 23, 2026 as The Illisian. The lower levels contain the Conrad Athens The Ilisian hotel, part of Hilton's luxury Conrad Hotels division. The hotel portion was reduced from 506 rooms to 278 rooms. The top floors of the building have been converted to luxury residences, 18 under the "Conrad Residences" brand and 37 under the "Waldorf Astoria Residences" brand.

== Facilities ==
The Ilisian includes a range of restaurants, bars and leisure venues offering a variety of dining concepts and experiences.

The Ilisian also includes House of NYNN, a private members' club featuring dining and entertainment venues, meeting and co-working spaces, as well as fitness and wellness facilities, including a gym and an indoor swimming pool.
