= Vasilissis Sofias Avenue =

Avenue in the east side of Athens, Greece

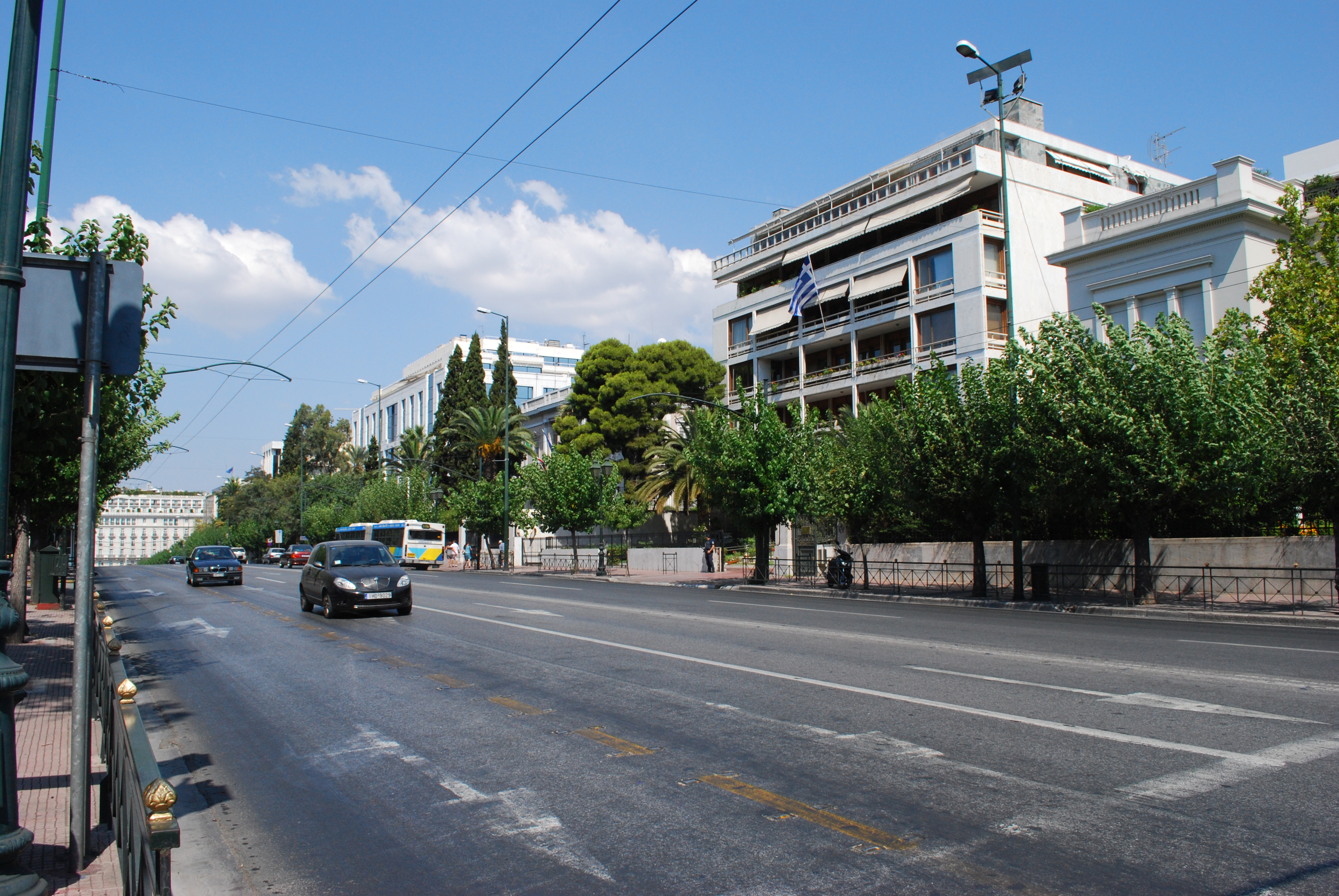
Vasilissis Sofias Avenue

Vasilissis Sofias Avenue (Greek: Λεωφόρος Βασιλίσσης Σοφίας) is a major avenue in the east side of the center of Athens, the Greek capital. The avenue was originally part of the Kifisias Avenue. The part from Syntagma Square to the intersection with Alexandras Avenue was renamed after Queen Sophia, the consort of King Constantine I. The avenue begins at the intersections of Amalias Avenue and Panepistimiou Street and ends by Alexandras, Kifissias and Mesogeion Avenues as well as Feidippou Street, with a total length of approximately 3 km. It is also part of the EO54 national road, which runs from Syntagma Square to Rafina.

The American embassy designed by Walter Gropius

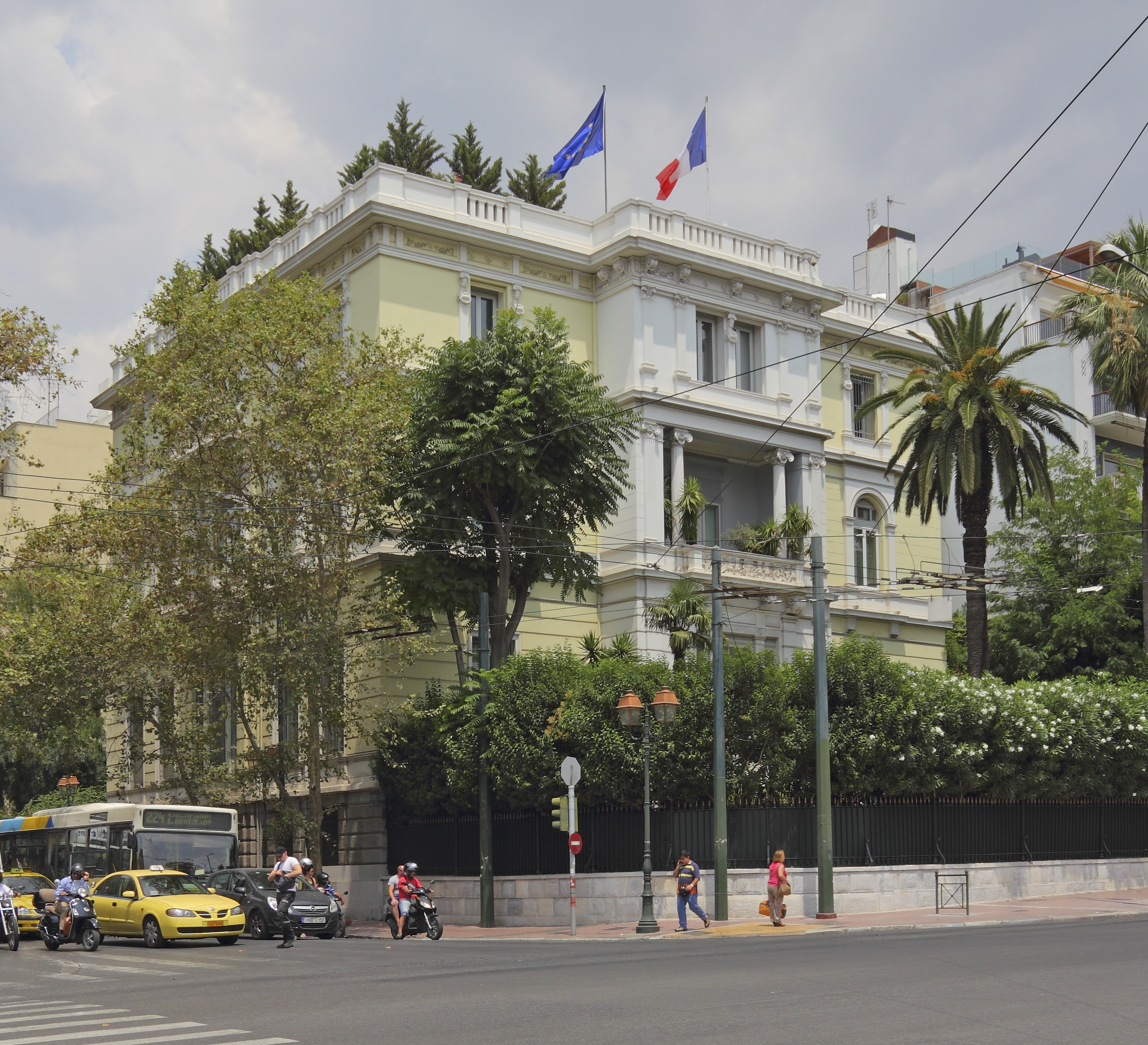
The French embassy

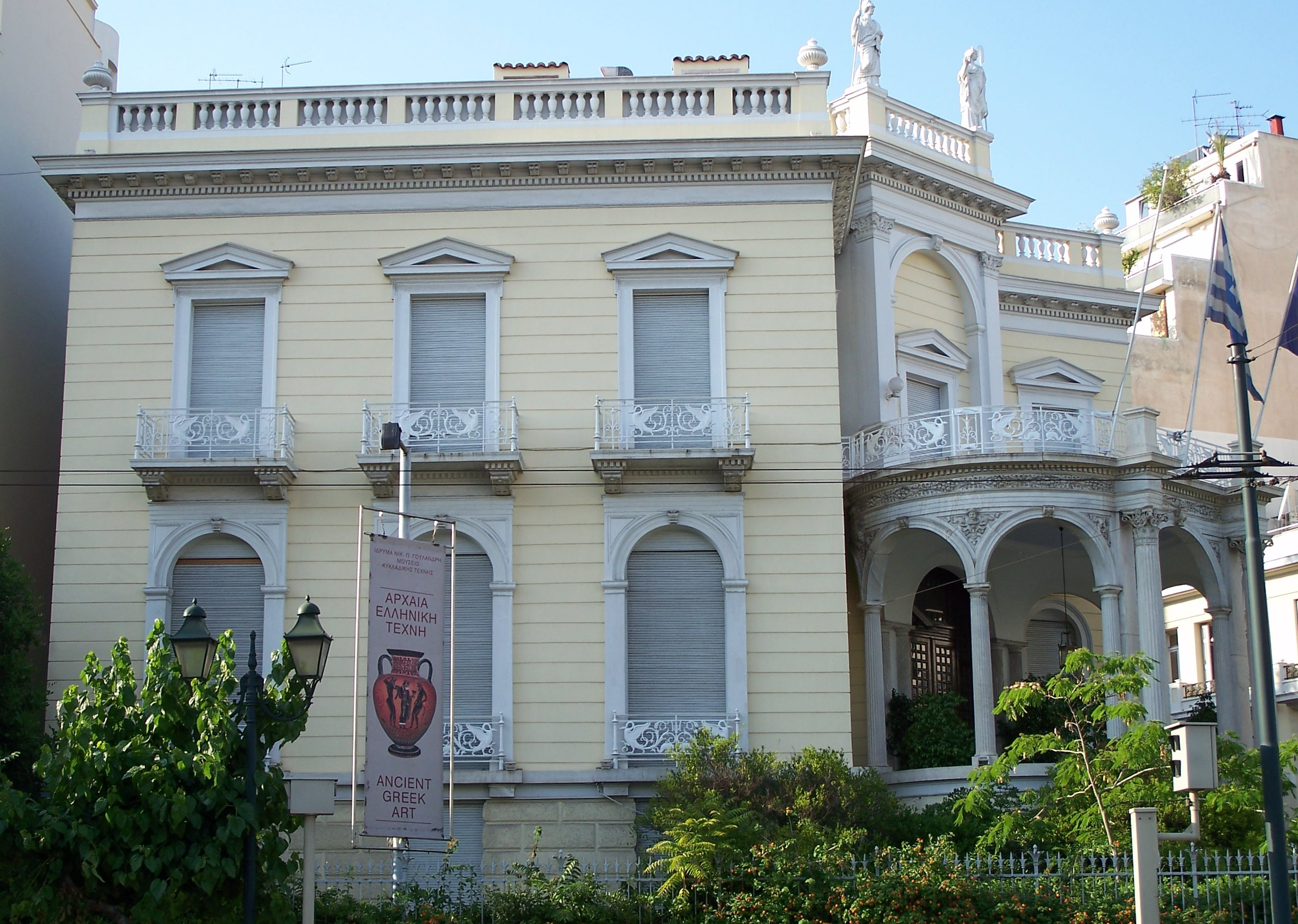
Goulandris Museum of Cycladic Art

Hilton Athens

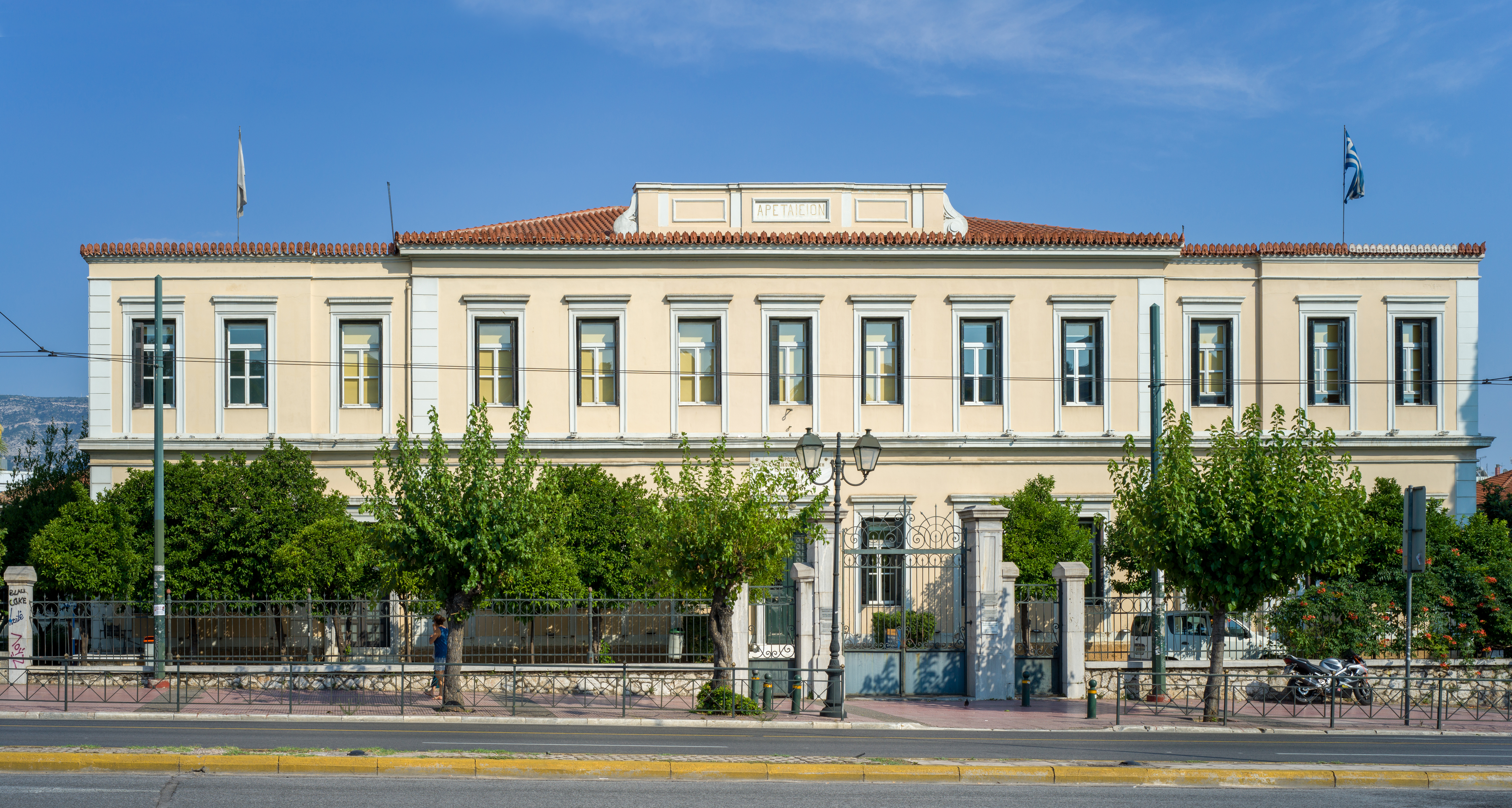
Aretaieion Hospital

As many historical buildings and landmarks are located on the avenue, such as the Old Royal Palace (today housing the Greek Parliament) and the National Gardens of Athens, the mansions of very important Greeks and foreigners (today most of them housing embassies and museums) (e.g. the residence of the Greek Prime Minister Eleutherios Venizelos-now part of the British embassy, the mansion of Sophie de Marbois-Lebrun, Duchess of Plaisance-now the Byzantine and Christian Museum, the mansion of business magnate and tycoon Othon Stathatos-today part of the Goulandris Museum of Cycladic Art), Vasilissis Sofias Avenue is one of the most chic and prestigious streets in the Greek capital. Because of the very high price of land on this street, most of the buildings seen on Vasilissis Sofias Avenue were mainly built in the 1950s–1960s, but others built in the beginnings of the 20th century are also commonly seen. Except from residences, medical doctors' private practices, banks, museums, embassies and high-end hotels are common on this historical street.

The westbound lanes turn into Amalias Avenue and Panepistimiou Street, and the northbound of Amalias turns into Vasileias Sofias Avenue and Panepistimiou Street; there is no traffic flow from the eastbound of Panepistimiou Street as it forms a one-way route westbound, and since the 2000s transit traffic has been excluded. Three Athens Metro stations (Line 3) are on, or near, Vassilissis Sofias Avenue: Syntagma, Evangelismos, Megaro Moussikis (the Evangelismos station is on the avenue).

== History ==
The avenue was first paved in the 20th century and added trolley lanes by the ends of the avenue, with neo-classical buildings also taking shape by the avenue. After World War II and the Greek Civil War, it added modern eight-to-ten storey buildings in most of the intersection (mainly to the north) with traffic and street lights installed. Today's Vassilissis Sofias Avenue has, on its west side, four lanes westbound and two lanes eastbound, while beyond, the rest of the avenue takes in three lanes, including a bus lane and intersection by Vasileos Konstantinou Avenue and Vasileos Alexandrou Street.

== Intersections ==
- Amalias Avenue and Panepistimiou Street
- Akadimias Street, north
- Solonos Street, north
- Koubari and Herodou Attikou streets
- Ploutarchou and Rizari Streets
- Marasli Street
- Vasileos Konstantinou Avenue and Vasileos Alexandrou Street
- Papadiamantopoulou Street
- D. Soutsou Street
- Mesogeion Avenue
- Alexandras and Kifissias Avenue

== Major buildings on Vassilissis Sofias Avenue ==
Culture

- Benaki Museum
- National Gardens of Athens
- Stathatos Mansion, part of the Goulandris Museum of Cycladic Art
- Athens War Museum
- National Gallery (Athens)
- Athens Concert Hall
- Byzantine and Christian Museum

Education

- Academy of Art

Institutions

- Greek Parliament
- Offices of the EU in Athens
- National Research Institute
- Embassy of Argentina, Athens
- Embassy of France, Athens
- Embassy of Serbia, Athens
- Embassy of the United Kingdom, Athens
- Embassy of the United States, Athens
- Embassy of Portugal, Athens
- Embassy of Brazil, Athens
- European Network and Information Security Agency

Hospitals

- Aretaieion Hospital
- Alexandra Hospital
- Ippokrateion Hospital

Hotels

- Hilton Athens

== See also ==
- List of streets in Athens
