= Goulandris =

Goulandris (Greek: Γουλανδρής, feminine/genitive form Γουλανδρή) is a surname. Notable people with the surname include:

- Alexandros Goulandris (1927–2017), Greek ship owner
- Basil Goulandris (1913–1994), Greek ship owner and arts patron
- Chryss Goulandris (1950–2023), Greek-Irish ship owner and horse breeder
- John Goulandris (1930–2016), Greek ship owner
- Nicholas J. Goulandris (1891–1957), Greek ship owner
- Niki Goulandris (1925–2019), Greek painter and philanthropist
- Nikos Goulandris (1913–1983), Greek shipping tycoon and sports team owner
