= Coumantaros =

Coumantaros is a Greek surname. Notable people with the surname include:

- George S. Coumantaros (1922–2016), Greek businessman and yachtsman
- Ioannis Coumantaros (1894–1981), Greek businessman
- John Coumantaros (born 1961), Greek-American businessman
