= SS Shiranesan Maru =

A number of steamships have been named Shiranesan Maru, including -

- SS Savoia, an Italian-built cargo ship launched in 1922 that was in Japanese service from 1951 to 1962 as Shiranesan Maru
- SS Shiranesan Maru (1943), a Japanese cargo ship torpedoed and sunk in February 1944
