= SS John M. Brooke =

World War II Liberty ship of the United States

History

United States
- Name: John M. Brooke
- Namesake: John Mercer Brooke
- Owner: War Shipping Administration (WSA)
- Operator: North Atlantic & Gulf SS Co.
- Ordered: as type (EC2-S-C1) hull, MC hull 1550
- Builder: J.A. Jones Construction, Panama City, Florida
- Cost: $1,355,928
- Yard number: 32
- Way number: 4
- Laid down: 30 December 1943
- Launched: 24 February 1944
- Completed: 31 March 1944
- Identification: Call Signal: KWBP
- Fate: Laid up in National Defense Reserve Fleet, James River Group, Lee Hall, Virginia, 19 May 1946; Sold for commercial use, 14 February 1947

Greece
- Name: Stavros Coumantaros
- Namesake: Stavros Coumantaros
- Owner: J.S. Coumantaros
- Acquired: 14 February 1947
- Fate: Scrapped, 1968

General characteristics
- Class & type: Liberty ship; type EC2-S-C1, standard
- Tonnage: 10,865 LT DWT; 7,176 GRT
- Displacement: 3,380 long tons (3,434 t) (light); 14,245 long tons (14,474 t) (max)
- Length: 441 feet 6 inches (135 m) oa; 416 feet (127 m) pp; 427 feet (130 m) lwl
- Beam: 57 feet (17 m)
- Draft: 27 ft 9.25 in (8.4646 m)
- Installed power: 2 × Oil fired 450 °F (232 °C) boilers, operating at 220 psi (1,500 kPa); 2,500 hp (1,900 kW)
- Propulsion: 1 × triple-expansion steam engine, (manufactured by General Machinery Corp., Hamilton, Ohio); 1 × screw propeller
- Speed: 11.5 knots (21.3 km/h; 13.2 mph)
- Capacity: 562,608 cubic feet (15,931 m^{3}) (grain); 499,573 cubic feet (14,146 m^{3}) (bale)
- Complement: 38–62 USMM; 21–40 USNAG
- Armament: Varied by ship; Bow-mounted 3-inch (76 mm)/50-caliber gun; Stern-mounted 4-inch (102 mm)/50-caliber gun; 2–8 × single 20-millimeter (0.79 in) Oerlikon anti-aircraft (AA) cannons and/or, 2–8 × 37-millimeter (1.46 in) M1 AA guns

SS John M. Brooke was a Liberty ship built in the United States during World War II. She was named after John Mercer Brooke, an early graduate of the United States Naval Academy, he perfected a "deep-sea sounding device", which was instrumental in the creation of the Transatlantic Cable. In 1861, he resigned his commission in the US Navy and joined the Confederate Navy where he was involved with the conversion of the ironclad CSS Virginia, the development of a new rifled naval gun, the Brooke rifle, and the establishment of the Confederate States Naval Academy.

== Construction ==
John M. Brooke was laid down on 30 December 1943, under a Maritime Commission (MARCOM) contract, MC hull 1550, by J.A. Jones Construction, Panama City, Florida; she was launched on 24 February 1944.

== History ==
She was allocated to North Atlantic & Gulf SS Co., on 31 March 1944. On 15 May 1946, she was laid up in the National Defense Reserve Fleet, in the James River Group, in Lee Hall, Virginia. On 2 February 1947, she was sold her J.S. Coumantaros, Piraeus, Greece. She was renamed Stavros Coumantaros. She was scrapped in Taiwan, in 1968.

== Bibliography ==
- "Jones Construction, Panama City FL". www.ShipbuildingHistory.com. 13 October 2010.
- "Liberty Ships – World War II".
- Maritime Administration. "John M. Brooke". Ship History Database Vessel Status Card. U.S. Department of Transportation, Maritime Administration. Archived from the original on 12 December 2019.
- Davies, James (May 2004). "Specifications (As-Built)" (PDF). p. 23.
- "SS John M. Brooke".
