= SS Dainichi Maru =

SS Dainichi Maru (大日丸) was the name of a number of ships.

- SS Dainichi Maru (1893), a Japanese cargo ship in service 1911–31
- SS Dainichi Maru (Mitsui Bussan, 1922) a Japanese hell ship in the Second World War.
- SS Dainichi Maru (Stabilimento Tecnico, 1922), a refrigerated cargo ship used as a shellfish cannery from 1962–68.
