= Ioannis Coumantaros =

Greek businessman

Ioannis "John" Coumantaros
- Born: Ioannis S. Coumantaros; 1894
- Died: 1981 (aged 86–87)
- Occupation: Businessman
- Spouse: Flora Nomikos
- Children: 2, including George S. Coumantaros
- Relatives: Stavros Niarchos (nephew); Nicholas P. "Nikos" Goulandris (son-in-law)

Ioannis S. "John" Coumantaros (1894–1981) was a Greek shipping and flour mills businessman.

== Early life ==
He was the son of Stavros Coumantaros from Sparta, and had three older brothers, Theodoros, Nikolaos and Panayotis. The brothers founded the Evrotas flour mills in Piraeus, and moved into shipping in 1932.

== Career ==
Ioannis ran the ships, along with his nephew Stavros Niarchos, the son of his sister, Eugenie Koumantaros, who had married Spyros Niarchos.

== Personal life ==
He married Flora Nomikos, the daughter of Peter Nomikos, from a "traditional maritime family".

They had two children, a son, George S. Coumantaros, who married, Sophie Yannagas, the daughter of George Yannagas from Kasos, and they had two sons, Yannis and John, and three daughters, Flora, Elena and Eugenie. Their daughter Aikaterini "Dolly" I. Coumantaros married Nicholas P. "Nikos" Goulandris from Andros. They founded the Goulandris Museum of Cycladic Art in Athens.
