= Elise Goulandris =

Greek art collector

Elise Goulandris (née Karadontis; Athens, 1917 – 25 July 2000) was a Greek art collector, and the co-founder of Greece's first Museum of Modern Art, the Museum of Contemporary Art Andros. In 1950 she met and married the ship owner Basil Goulandris.
