= Museum of Contemporary Art Andros =

Museum located in Andros, Greece

Coordinates: 37.8386°N 24.9389°E

View of museum from seaside

The Museum of Contemporary Art Andros is a museum located in Andros, Greece.

== History ==
Museum entrance

The museum was founded in 1979 by Basil and Elisa Goulandris as a venue in which international exhibitions could be housed. The building was designed by architect Stamos Papadakis and the exterior areas were designed by Miranda Spiliotopoulou-Vazaka.

In 1990, the building was represented in the International Garden and Greenery Exposition competition in Osaka, Japan.

== Collection ==
The museum houses more than 300 paintings by Greek artists such as Takis, Chryssa, Fassianos, Kounellis, Psychopedis and Tetsis, and international artists such as Auguste Rodin, and Paul Delvaux.
