= Flour Mills of Nigeria =

Food and Agro-allied Company

Flour Mills of Nigeria (FMN)
- Type: Private
- ISIN: NGFLOURMILL0
- Industry: Food and Agro-allied Group
- Founded: 29 September 1960; 65 years ago
- Founder: George S. Coumantaros
- Headquarters: Lagos, Nigeria
- Revenue: ₦2.3 Trillion ($1.6 Billion) (2023/2024)
- Number of employees: 12,000 (2017)
- Parent: Excelsior Shipping Co. Ltd.
- Website: www.fmnplc.com

Flour Mills of Nigeria (FMN) also known as FMN Group is a Nigerian diversified agribusiness company, it was founded in 1960 by George S. Coumantaros. It is one of the leading FMCG companies in Nigeria and West Africa. FMN employs over 12,000 people.

In 1978, it became a public company and listed its shares on the Nigerian Stock Exchange. In January 2025, it was delisted after majority shareholder, Excelsior Shipping Company Limited, acquired all shares held by minority shareholders.

The chairman of FMN since 2014, and its former CEO is the founder's son, John Coumantaros. The CEO is Omoboyede Olusanya.

The flagship brand of the company is Golden Penny Flour.

== History ==
Flour Mills started operations in 1962, the first wheat mill plant in Nigeria, it was built at a cost of £2.5m financed by Greek and American capital through Southern Star Shipping company. Initial annual production was 120,000 tonnes. The company's Apapa complex has bulk unloading and storage capabilities with a mill to process North American wheat blends. In 1964, the company expanded its offering with the establishment of a polypropylene manufacturing plant that traded under the business name Nigerian Bag Manufacturing Company Limited. The initial facility also processed wheat offals to be exported.

By 1971, the annual capacity of its wheat mill was 300,000 tonnes. In 1975, the company bought minority equity interest in Northern Nigeria Flours Mills, Kano and later acquired interest in Niger Mills of Calabar. In the late 1970s, the company was listed on the Nigerian Stock exchange.

The FMN brand sprouted from a single commodity company, to a conglomerate operating in key sectors of the Nigerian economy. They operate in four major sectors of Food, Su, Agro-allied, Port Operations and Logistics, Packaging and Real Estate. They operate a vertically integrated supply food chain amongst their other businesses.

In 1990, another polypropylene manufacturing business was established in 1997 in Northern Nigeria trading under the business name Northern Bag Manufacturing Company, two years later Golden Shipping Company was established. In 1997, an extension of business offerings led to the founding of a fertilizer marketing business, expansion continued with the introduction of a cement partnership UNICEM in 2002, port management trading under the name Apapa Bulk Terminal in 2004, Golden Transport in 2008 and Premier Feeds in 2010. In August 2015, a holding company, Excelsior Shipping was established to manage the affairs of some of its subsidiaries. Apapa Bulk Terminal operates Terminal A and B at Apapa Port.

The company operated a bulk cement bagging operation at Apapa trading Burham Cement, following compliance with government regulations to promote local cement manufacturing that operation was discontinued at the firm went into a partnership with Orascom to establish a cement facility at Mfanmosing, Cross River State.

In 2021, FMN acquired 71.6% of Honeywell Group's Honeywell Flour Mills Plc.

== Subsidiaries ==
2016
Subsidiary	Interest (%)	Line of business
Apapa Bulk Terminal	100	Logistics/Support
Northern Nigeria Flour Mills	52.6	Consumer goods
Nigerian Eagle Flour Mills	51	Consumer goods
Niger Mills	100	Consumer goods
Golden Pasta	100	Consumer goods
Golden Noodles	100	Food/consumer goods
Golden Sugar	100	Food.consumer goods
Golden Shipping Co	100	Logistics
Premier Feed	62	Agro-allied
ROM Oil Mills	90	Agro-allied
Kaboji Farms	100	Agro-allied
UNICEM	22	other
Nigerian Bag Manufacturing Company	100	support
