= Oba Otudeko =

Nigerian businessman (born 1943)

Omoba Oba Otudeko CFR
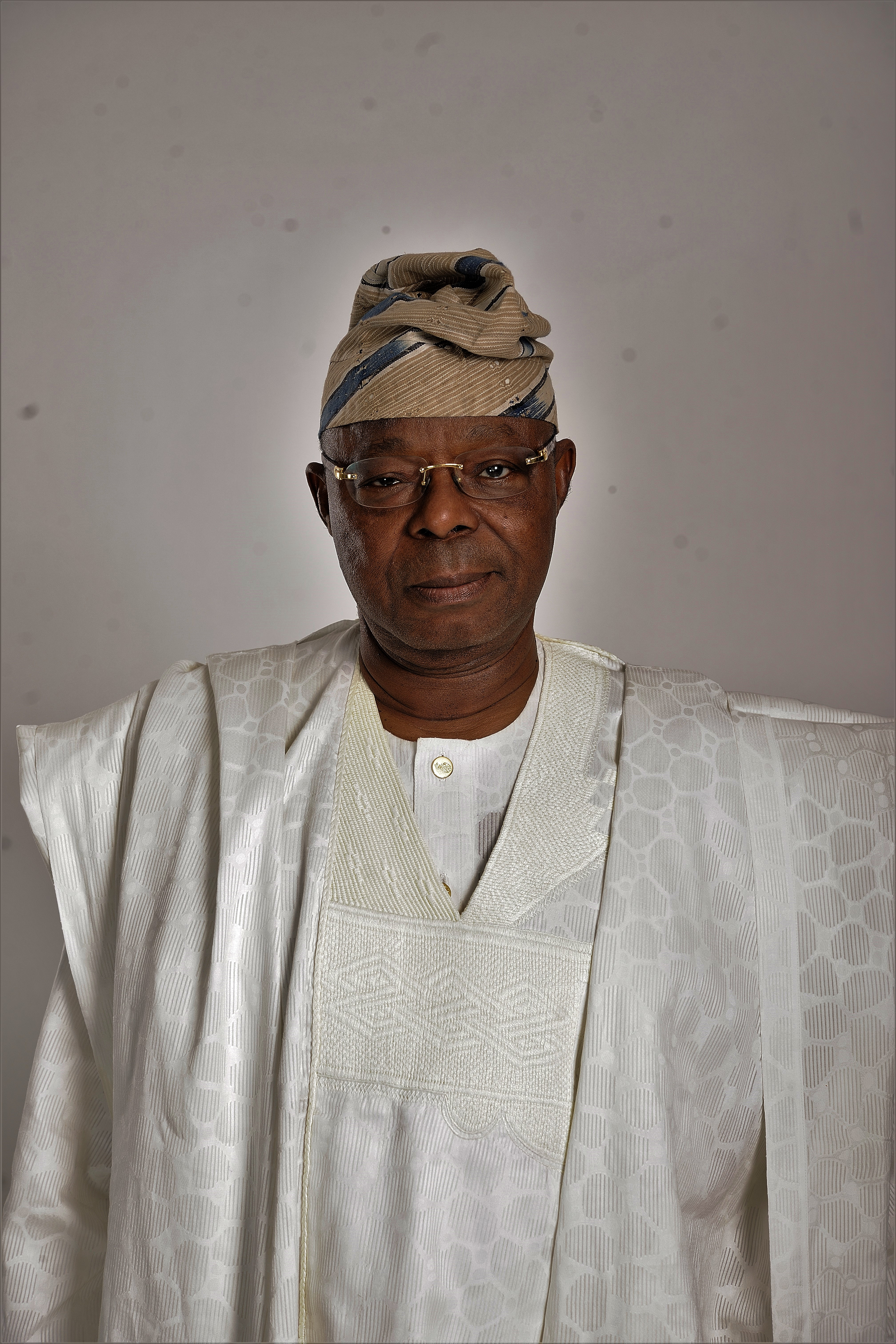
- Born: Oba Otudeko; 18 August 1943 (age 83); Ibadan, Oyo State, Nigeria
- Education: Olivet Baptist High School; Leeds College of Commerce; Harvard University; Hult International Business School
- Occupations: Entrepreneur, Founder and Chairman of Honeywell Group
- Years active: 1972—present
- Known for: Entrepreneurship, Corporate Governance, Philanthropy
- Website: obaotudeko.com

Oba Otudeko CFR (born 18 August 1943) is a Nigerian businessman who founded the Honeywell Group. He is also the founder of the Oba Otudeko Foundation and former chairman of FBN Holdings.

== Early life and education ==
Ayoola Oba Otudeko was born in Ibadan, Oyo State, South-West Nigeria on 18 August 1943 to a royal family, thus making him an Omoba of the Yoruba people. His mother was a businesswoman. He studied at St. John’s School, Oke-Agbo, in Ijebu-Igbo, Ogun State before proceeding to Olivet Baptist High School, Oyo. Later, he studied Accountancy at the Leeds College of Commerce Leeds, Yorkshire, United Kingdom (which is now part of the Leeds Beckett University). Professionally, Oba Otudeko is a Chartered Banker, Chartered Accountant and a Chartered Corporate Secretary.

Oba Otudeko has also attended executive management training programs at International Institute for Management Development (IMD), Harvard Business School and Hult International Business School (then known as Arthur D. Little School of Management).

== Career ==
Oba Otudeko began his career at Cooperative Bank in Ibadan at the age of 17 as an accounts clerk. He completed his Fellowship of the Chartered Institute of Bankers and was promoted to manager by age 21.

The bank supported his studies at Leeds College of Commerce in the UK. Upon his return, he rose to Senior Accountant, eventually becoming General Manager and acting CEO before retiring in 1983.

Following his retirement, the Federal government of Nigeria appointed him a Director to the Board of the Central Bank of Nigeria from 1990 to 1997.

== Investments ==
=== Honeywell Group ===
In the 1970s, Oba Otudeko founded Honeywell Enterprises. The company began as a trading company, importing and exporting essential goods, such as dairy products, stock fish, glass, and steel rods into and out of the country.

The trading enterprise later grew into Honeywell Group, a dynamic investment holding company with diversified interests spanning food manufacturing, oil, gas and energy services, telecommunications, financial services, hospitality, and real estate.

=== Telecommunication ===
Under Otudeko’s leadership, Honeywell Group made notable expansions across key economic sectors. One such expansion was Honeywell Group’s entry into the telecommunications sector in 2001. Otudeko led the consortium to secure one of the first GSM licenses (Econet) in Nigeria. Otudeko also made the historic first mobile phone call in the country, symbolizing the dawn of a new era in communication.

With his involvement in Econet Wireless (now Airtel Nigeria) fueling the rapid expansion and innovation of mobile services nationwide, Econet Nigeria’s subscriber base grew from 15 million to 22 million and the telecommunication firm controlled the second largest market share in Nigeria.

In 2013, Honeywell Group sold its holdings in Airtel Nigeria to Bharti Airtel.

=== Leadership and Corporate Governance ===
Beyond his own entrepreneurial ventures, Otudeko is an investor at heart and his influence extended to the boardrooms of some of Nigeria’s largest and most prominent corporations. He served on the boards of several leading companies such as Fan Milk Nigeria, Airtel Nigeria, and First Bank of Nigeria.

He was the 16th President of the Council of the Nigerian Stock Exchange from 2006 to 2009.

==== First Bank of Nigeria ====
As Chairman of First Bank of Nigeria, Otudeko played a pivotal role in the bank’s transformation into one of Africa’s leading financial institutions. Under Otudeko’s leadership First Bank transitioned from a purely commercial bank to a financial holding company with tentacles spread across insurance, asset management and investment banking. The holding company structure provided a platform for growth across different financial services, ensuring the bank’s ability to adapt to changing market conditions.

He has also held directorship positions in private companies operating in real estate, international trade and finance, and brewing, including Guinness Nigeria and Ecobank Transnational Inc.

Beyond the corporate sphere, Otudeko has also been actively involved in various national economic and policy development initiatives. He was a member of the Constituent Assembly in 1988-1989 where he contributed to the drafting of the Nigerian constitution.

== Achievements and Awards ==
Oba Otudeko was Chairman of the Nigerian-South African Chamber of Commerce (NSACC) and aimed to facilitate investment flows into Nigeria. During his tenure as the NSACC Chairman, the volume of Nigeria-South Africa bilateral trade grew significantly from $16.5 million in 1999 to $2.9 billion in 2010. He was also on the Board of the NEPAD Business Group – Nigeria.

He was Chairman of the Business Support Group (BSG) for the delivery of the National Integrated Infrastructure Master Plan (NIIMP). In 2013, he was also appointed the chairman of the Digital Africa Conference Exhibition in Abuja, Nigeria.

From 2001 to 2010, he was Chancellor of the Olabisi Onabanjo University, Ago-Iwoye, Ogun State.

=== Awards ===
Oba Otudeko has received various awards for his contributions to entrepreneurship and the Nigerian economy.

In recognition of his contributions to the nation’s economic growth, Otudeko was awarded the Member of the Order of the Federal Republic (MFR) in 2002. In 2002, the Federal Government of Nigeria honored Oba Otudeko with the title of Officer of the Federal Republic (OFR). In 2011, he was elevated to Commander of the Order of the Federal Republic (CFR). In 2019, he received the prestigious National Productivity Order of Merit (NPOM) Award from the Federal Government of Nigeria.

Some of his awards include:

- Honorary Doctor of Science (D.Sc.) from Olabisi Onabanjo University, Ago-Iwoye.
- Honorary Doctor of Science in Banking and Finance from Crescent University, Abeokuta, Ogun State.
- Honorary Doctor of Science Degree (D.Sc.) from Ajayi Crowther University, Oyo Town, Oyo State;.
- Entrepreneur of the Year Award at the ThisDay Awards in 2009. Ernst & Young Lifetime Achievement Award;
- Leadership Newspaper Business Person of the Year 2015;
- Silverbird Extraordinary Lifetime Achievement Award and recently, the 2016 Africa CEO Forum's Africa CEO of the Year Award.

== Personal life ==
He is married to Mrs Adebisi Aderonke Otudeko.
