= Southern Star Shipping =

Southern Star Shipping Co. Inc. is a transportation and logistics company. The company is headquartered at 1370 Avenue of the Americas, New York, NY.

== History ==
Southern Star Shipping was founded by George S. Coumantaros in New York in 1947. His son, John Coumantaros, began his career in 1984 with Southern Star, and has been president since 2009.
