= Honeywell Group =

Nigerian conglomerate company

- Type: Private
- Industry: Conglomerate
- Founded: 1972; 54 years ago
- Founder: Oba Otudeko
- Headquarters: Lagos, Lagos State, Nigeria
- Products: Flour; Wheat; Noodles; Pasta
- Services: Energy; Real Estate; Security; Hospitality; Power
- Number of employees: 10,000
- Subsidiaries: Honeywell Flour Mills; HOGL Energy Limited; Pivot Engineering Company; Uraga Real Estate; Anchorage Leisures; Pavilion Technology; Broadview Engineering; Hudson Power; Uraga Power Solution; Honeywell Energy
- Website: Official website

Honeywell Group is a conglomerate based in Nigeria. It operates in diversified businesses such as foods and agriculture, telecommunication and infrastructure, real estate and financial services. The company was founded by Dr. Oba Otudeko, who is the group chairman.

== Overview ==
Honeywell operates across five main sectors. The Group is diversified along the lines of foods and agro-allied, real estate, infrastructure, energy and services. The conglomerate includes:

- HOGL Energy Limited
- Pivot Engineering Company Limited (PECL)
- Uraga Real Estate Limited
- Anchorage Leisures Limited
- Pavilion Technology Limited

== History ==
Oba Otudeko started Honeywell Group as a trading enterprise in 1972. Initially, the company majored in importation and marketing of commodities between the North and South of Nigeria and later across the West African sub-region, especially Ghana. The company traded baking yeast, stock fish, glass, steel rods and other commodities. The Group has since evolved into a leading Nigerian conglomerate employing over 5000 staff. Gateway Honeywell Flour mills, a food processing company, was registered in 1985. The company later changed its name to Honeywell Flour Mills Plc. It produces flour-based products including baking flour, ball foods, noodles and pasta.

Honeywell Group has also recorded a number of milestones in its almost five decades of operations. Some of these milestones are: listing of Honeywell Flour Mills on the Nigerian Stock Exchange in 2009 after an initial public offering (IPO) in 2008; opening of the first Radisson Blu hotel brand in Nigeria in 2011 (the Radisson Blu Anchorage Hotel in Victoria Island); and launch of the first trampoline park in West Africa, called Upbeat Recreation Centre, Lekki Lagos.

During the Centenary anniversary of Nigeria in 2014, the Federal Government recognised the Honeywell Group among the top 100 companies in the country.

In 2021, Flour Mills of Nigeria acquired 71.6% of Honeywell Flour Mills.

== Subsidiaries ==
The Group is divided into five main sectors; namely, Foods & Agro Allied, Infrastructure, Energy, Real Estate and Services. The Foods & Agro Allied subsidiary is Honeywell Flour Mills Plc (flour-based consumer products) which is listed under the Nigerian Stock Exchange. Under Infrastructure, there are Pivot Engineering Company Limited (an electrical and mechanical engineering contracting firm) and Broadview Engineering Ltd (an EPC contracting company in oil and gas).

In the Energy sector, the Group’s interests include HOGL Energy Limited (an operator in the downstream sector of the oil industry that incorporated in 1995); Hudson Petroleum Limited (representing the upstream oil activities of the Group); Hudson Power Limited (a power generation and distribution company) and Honeywell Energy Resources International Ltd (energy provider). The Honeywell Group with its energy aspect of business partnered with General Electric (GE) in 2013 to boost power generation in Nigeria.

Uraga Real Estates Limited (a property development company) and Anchorage Leisures Limited (a tourism and hospitality promotion outfit) make up the Real Estate sector of the Group. Pavilion Technology Limited is the Group's operating company in the Service sector.

== Contributions ==
Honeywell contributes to human and economic development through a number of initiatives. It has the Honeywell Baking School programme, which is a vocational training programme in Baking Technology. The programme offers participants skills on modern and more efficient baking methods that will ensure better baked products. Honeywell Group also runs the Honeywell Excellence Programme (HEP). HEP is a platform for young, intelligent Nigerian graduates of tertiary institutions to hone their business management skills by providing them with a comprehensive and robust training in business management principles, over a-12 month period. Recently, Honeywell launched an accelerator programme called 'Itanna'.

Itanna is a social impact investment aimed at facilitating rapid growth of innovative, tech-based start-ups and transform them into strategic enterprises that will further propel economic growth on the African continent. Finally, Honeywell regularly donates gifts, cash and products to orphanages as part of its corporate social responsibility.

== Leadership ==
Dr. Oba Otudeko has served as chairman since 2012. Previously, he was Group Chairman of FBN Holdings PLC. He studied at Leeds College of Commerce. He also serves on the board for Lagos Sheraton Hotel.

Nino Albert Ozara is the Executive Director and Manufacturing Director of Honeywell Flour Mills Plc.
