= George S. Coumantaros =

Founder of Southern Star Shipping and Flour Mills of Nigeria

- Born: George Stavros Coumantaros; July 23, 1922; London, U.K.
- Died: October 17, 2016 (aged 94); Athens, Greece
- Occupation: Businessman
- Known for: founder of Southern Star Shipping and Flour Mills of Nigeria
- Spouse: Sophie Yannagas
- Children: 1 son, 3 daughters, Flora, Maria Christina, John George, Eugenie
- Parent(s): Ioannis "John" Coumantaros; Flora Nomikos

George Stavros Coumantaros (July 23, 1922 – October 17, 2016) was a Greek businessman and yachtsman. He was the founder of Southern Star Shipping, a privately owned international shipping company, and Flour Mills of Nigeria, a public company listed on the Nigerian Stock Exchange. He competed in, and won many yacht races, including the Bermuda Race. He was a Grand Archon of the Greek Orthodox Church.

== Early life ==
George Stravos Coumantaros was born on July 23, 1922, in London, United Kingdom. His father was Ioannis "John" Coumantaros and his mother, Flora Nomikos, the daughter of Peter Nomikos, a "traditional maritime family". He grew up in Greece until the outbreak of the Greco-Italian War in 1940, when he moved to Argentina with his family until 1947.

== Career ==
Coumantaros began his career in Buenos Aires, Argentina, where he worked for a grain trading company. He founded the Southern Star Shipping Co. in New York City in 1947. The company shipped "industrial steel, aluminum, coal, cement and petroleum" internationally. He was a member of the American Bureau of Shipping. Additionally, he was the vice chairman of the West of England Mutual Insurance Association.

Coumantaros founded Flour Mills of Nigeria in September 1960, and served as its chairman. In 1978, it became a public company listed on the Nigerian Stock Exchange. The company grows " maize, cassava, soya, sugar cane, and oil palm," and sells "rice, flour, pasta, snacks, sugar, and noodles."

Coumantaros built a brewery and a steel factory in Greece in the 1980s.

== Yachting ==
Coumantaros was a member of the New York Yacht Club, the Cruising Club of America, the Indian Harbor Yacht Club of Greenwich in Connecticut, the Royal Yacht Squadron in Cowes, the Isle of Wight, the Yacht Club Costa Smeralda in Porto Cervo, the Yacht Club of Greece, and the Lyford Cay Club in Lyford Cay, Nassau, Bahamas. He competed in the Fastnet Race in 1979. He competed in the Bermuda Race 26 times.

Coumantaros gave his last yacht, Boomerang to the US Merchant Marine Academy, in Kings Point, New York, for use in training.

Coumantaros was inducted into the National Sailing Hall of Fame in 2018 with a Lifetime Achievement Award.

== Personal life and death ==
Coumantaros and his wife, Sophie Yannagas, had one son, John, and three daughters, Flora, Maria Christina and Eugenie. Sophie/Sophia was the daughter of George Yannagas from Kasos.

He was a Grand Archon of the Greek Orthodox Church, and served on the board of the Archdiocesan Cathedral of the Holy Trinity on the Upper East Side of New York City. He was an annual fellow of the Metropolitan Museum of Art in 1986–1987. He served on the board of the Goulandris Museum of Cycladic Art in Athens.

Coumantaros died on October 17, 2016, in Athens, Greece. His funeral was held in Athens and another service was held in New York City.
