= John Goulandris =

Greek shipowner

- Born: John (Giannis) B. Goulandris; 1930; Andros, Greece
- Died: 19 May 2016 (aged 85–86)
- Occupation: Shipowner
- Spouse: Maria Lemos
- Children: Chryss Goulandris
- Relatives: Nicholas "Nikos" (brother); Vassilis "Basil" Goulandris; Sir Tony O'Reilly (son-in-law)

John B. Goulandris (Greek: Ιωάννης Β. "Γιάννης" Γουλανδρής, romanized: Ioánnis B. "Giánnis" Goulandrís) (1930 – 2016) was a Greek shipowner.

In 2009, he was living in London and the Sunday Times Rich List estimated his net worth at £200 million.

He was the vice–chairman of the Union of Greek Shipowners.

He was married to Maria Lemos. Their daughter, Chryss Goulandris was married to the Irish billionaire Sir Tony O'Reilly. Their son is Petros Goulandris.

He died in 2016, and was buried in Andros.
