= Basil Goulandris =

Greek shipowner

- Born: Vassilis Goulandris; 6 September 1913; Andros, Greece
- Died: 27 April 1994 (aged 80); Athens, Greece
- Occupation: shipowner
- Known for: US$3 billion art collection
- Spouse: Elisa Karadontis
- Relatives: Nikos Goulandris (brother)

Vassilis P. "Basil" Goulandris (6 September 1913 – 27 April 1994) was a Greek shipowner, and the founder of Greece's first Museum of Modern Art, the Museum of Contemporary Art Andros. He and his wife died childless and left an art collection worth $3 billion, which has been the subject of long-running litigation since she died in 2000.

== Early life ==
He was the son of Peter J Goulandris and Chrysa Dambassi.

He had a twin brother Nicholas "Nikos" (1913–83), elder brothers John (1907–50) and George (1908–74) and a younger brother Constantine (1916–78).

== Career ==
Basil Goulandris and his four brothers became known as the "Sons of Peter Goulandris", and in 1946 founded the Orion Shipping & Trading Co Inc, which made large purchases of US and Canadian-built ships, from a New York head office, and Capeside Steamship Co Ltd in London.

They bought at least 50 Liberty ships, and later commissioned new tankers and ore carriers, from US and Canada in 1953 to 1954, Japan from 1956 to 1994 and Polish from 1983 to 1984. In 1958, they had 82 ships, the second largest Greek shipowners. In 1970, Orion had 54 mostly larger ships, and were the largest Greek shipowners. In 1975, Orion had 64 ships, and were still the largest.

In the 1980s, only Basil of the five brothers was still alive, and he ran United Shipping & Trading out of Greece with his nephews, Peter J. Goulandris (son of John P. Goulandris and Maria Lemou), and Peter George Goulandris and Peter N. Goulandris, sons of Nikos Goulandris.

== Personal life ==
Goulandris married Elisa Karadontis, "an Athenian beauty", and they became collectors of modern art, establishing the Basil and Elisa Goulandris Foundation. In 1979, they founded the Museum of Contemporary Art Andros.

Basil did not leave a will when he died in 1994, Elise died in 2000, and as of 2016, there has been a 16-year feud over their art collection, estimated to be worth US$3 billion. As they were childless, and much of it was owned through a tangled web of offshore companies, there are several rival claims to the collection.

The leaked Panama Papers shed some light on the ownership of shell companies in protracted litigation in Lausanne over ownership of artwork from the Goulandris's Gstaad chalet.
