= Alexandros Goulandris =

Greek shipowner (1927–2017)

Alexandros "Aleko" Goulandris
- Born: Alexandros J. "Aleko" Goulandris; 1927
- Died: 25 May 2017 (aged 89–90)
- Occupation: shipowner
- Known for: founder of N. J. Goulandris
- Spouse: Marietta
- Children: 3 daughters: Violanto, Maria-Lula and Alexandra
- Parent: Nicholas J. Goulandris

Alexandros J. "Aleko" Goulandris (1927 – 25 May 2017) was a Greek shipowner, the son of Nicholas J. Goulandris, the founder of N. J. Goulandris.

In 1952, his father left the family firm, Goulandris Bros., and founded N. J. Goulandris in London. It grew with the help of his sons Yannis/John (b.1923) and twins Leonidas (b.1927) and Alexandros, and by 1958 was the sixth-largest Greek shipowner with 40 ships. The business is now known as Andriaki Shipping and is based in Marousi, Athens.

He married Marietta, and they had three daughters, Violanto (who pre-deceased him), Maria-Lula and Alexandra. In 1994 they restored the Tourlitis Lighthouse in Andros in memory of Violanto.

He died in May 2017, and was buried next to his wife in the First Cemetery of Athens.

Goulandris was a "noted but very private art collector and philanthropist".
