= SS Savoia =

Italian-built cargo steamship

History
- Name: 1922: Savoia; 1942: Empire Arun; 1947: Granlake; 1949: Dryad; 1951: Shiranesan Maru; 1962: Dainichi Maru; 1967: Tainichi Maru
- Namesake: 1922: Duchy of Savoy; 1942: River Arun; 1949: Dryad; 1951: Mount Nikkō-Shirane; 1962: Japanese for Vairocana
- Owner: 1922: Navigazione Libera Triestina; 1937: Lloyd Triestino; 1942: Ministry of War Transport; 1946: Ministry of Transport; 1947: Ormos Shipping; 1947: Goulandris Bros; 1949: Cia Maritime del Este; 1951: Hikari Kisen KK; 1954: Mitsui Kinkai Kisen KK & Others; 1956: Hokuyo Suisan KK; 1962: Nichiro Gyogyo KK
- Operator: Owner operated except: 1942: Union-Castle Line; 1949: Goulandris Bros (Hellas) Ltd
- Port of registry: 1922: Trieste; 1942: (United Kingdom) London; 1949: Panama; 1951: (Japan) Tokyo; 1954: (Japan) Kobe; 1956: (Japan) Tokyo
- Builder: Stabilimento Tecnico Triestino, Trieste
- Yard number: 736
- Launched: 25 May 1922
- Completed: 1 December 1922
- Refit: 1934; 1953
- Identification: 1923: Italian official number 625; 1923: code letters PGYH; 1933: Italian official number 115; 1934: call sign ICHB; 1942: UK official number 159353; 1942: call sign BCXG; 1949: call sign HOMW; 1951: Japanese official number 67467; 1951: call sign JGPR; 1969: IMO number: 5349334
- Captured: by Royal Navy, 11 February 1941
- Fate: Scrapped, August 1969

General characteristics
- Type: cargo ship
- Tonnage: 1923: 5,828 GRT; 3,630 NRT; 1934: 5,490 GRT; 3,417 NRT; 1949: 5,905 GRT; 4,149 NRT; 1953: 5,736 GRT; 4,119 NRT; 1967: 5,859 GRT; 3,503 NRT; 8,478 DWT
- Length: 404.2 ft (123.2 m) registered
- Beam: 54.0 ft (16.5 m)
- Draught: 25 ft 3 in (7.70 m)
- Depth: 29.0 ft (8.8 m)
- Decks: 1
- Installed power: as built: 2 × steam turbines; 600 NHP; by 1953: compound engine + exhaust steam turbine
- Propulsion: 1 × screw
- Speed: 12 1/2 knots (23 km/h)
- Capacity: about 307,960 cubic feet (8,720 m^{3}); from 1934: 23,310 cubic feet (660 m^{3}) thereof refrigerated
- Sensors & processing systems: by 1924: wireless direction finding; by 1953: echo sounding device
- Notes: sister ships: Livenza; Edda

SS Savoia was a cargo steamship that was built in Italy in 1922. In 1941 the Royal Navy captured her, and the UK Ministry of War Transport renamed her Empire Arun. In 1947 she was sold and renamed Granlake. With further changes of owner she was renamed Dryad in 1949; Shiranesan Maru in 1951; and Dainichi Maru in 1962. The romanised spelling of her name had been revised to Tainichi Maru by 1967. She was scrapped in Japan in 1969.

Savoia was built as a turbine steamship. By 1953 she had been re-engined with a compound engine and exhaust steam turbine. She was built as an ordinary breakbulk cargo ship, but from 1934 a small part of her cargo space was refrigerated. After 1951, she was a factory ship for canning shellfish.

== Building ==
In 1922, Stabilimento Tecnico Triestino (STT) in Trieste built a pair of cargo ships for Navigazione Libera Triestina (NLT). The first was Livenza, which was completed that September. Her sister ship Savoia was built as yard number 736; launched on 25 May; and completed on 1 December.

Savoia's registered length was 404.2 ft (123.2 m); her beam was 54.0 ft (16.5 m); her depth was 29.0 ft (8.8 m); and her draught was 25 ft 3 in (7.70 m). She had a single screw, driven by two steam turbines via double-reduction gearing. The total power of her turbines was rated at 600 NHP, and gave her a speed of 12 1/2 knots (23 km/h).

In November 1924, STT completed a third steam turbine cargo ship for NLT. Edda had similar dimensions to her two sisters, but differed in being an entirely refrigerated cargo ship.

== Savoia ==
NLT registered Savoia in Trieste. Her Italian official number was 625, and her code letters were PGYH. By 1924 she was equipped with wireless direction finding. By 1933 her registration number had been changed to 115. By 1934 the wireless telegraph call sign ICHB had superseded her code letters. Also in 1934, G Barbieri & Co installed equipment to refrigerate 23,310 cubic feet (660 m^{3}) of her cargo space. This slightly reduced her tonnages, to 5,490 GRT and 3,417 NRT.

In 1937 the Italian government reorganised the country's merchant shipping industry. NLT was dissolved, and its fleet divided between "Italia" SA di Navigazione and Lloyd Triestino. Livenza was transferred to "Italia", and Savoia and Edda were transferred to Lloyd Triestino.

When Italy entered the Second World War in June 1940, Savoia was in Kismayo in Italian Somaliland. As the Royal Navy and Royal Indian Navy were patrolling the Indian Ocean, Savoia and other Italian ships remained in Kismayo for safety.

=== Capture ===
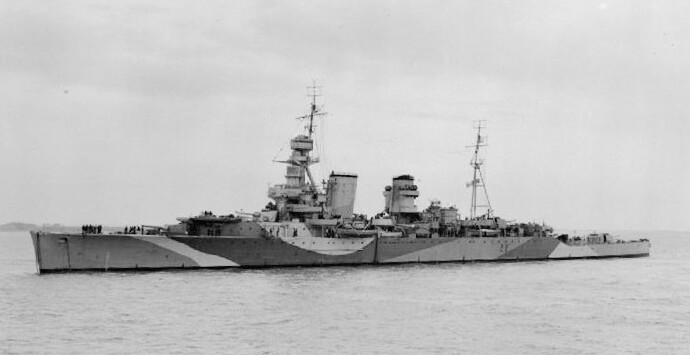
HMS Hawkins in May 1942

Late in January 1941, British and Empire troops invaded Italian Somaliland in Operation Canvas. On the night of 10–11 February, eight Italian ships including Savoia, along with two German ships, left Kismayo to try to reach Diego Suarez (now Antsiranana) in French Madagascar, which was under Vichy French rule. The Royal Navy heavy cruiser HMS Hawkins was waiting to intercept them. She captured Savoia on 11 February, and also captured the troopship Leonardo da Vinci; cargo liner Adria; and cargo ships Erminia Mazzella and Manon. On 13 February Hawkins and the aircraft carrier HMS Eagle sank the oil tanker Pensilvania. The only Italian ships that reached Diego Suarez from Kismayo were the cargo liner Somalia, and the cargo ship Duca degli Abruzzi.

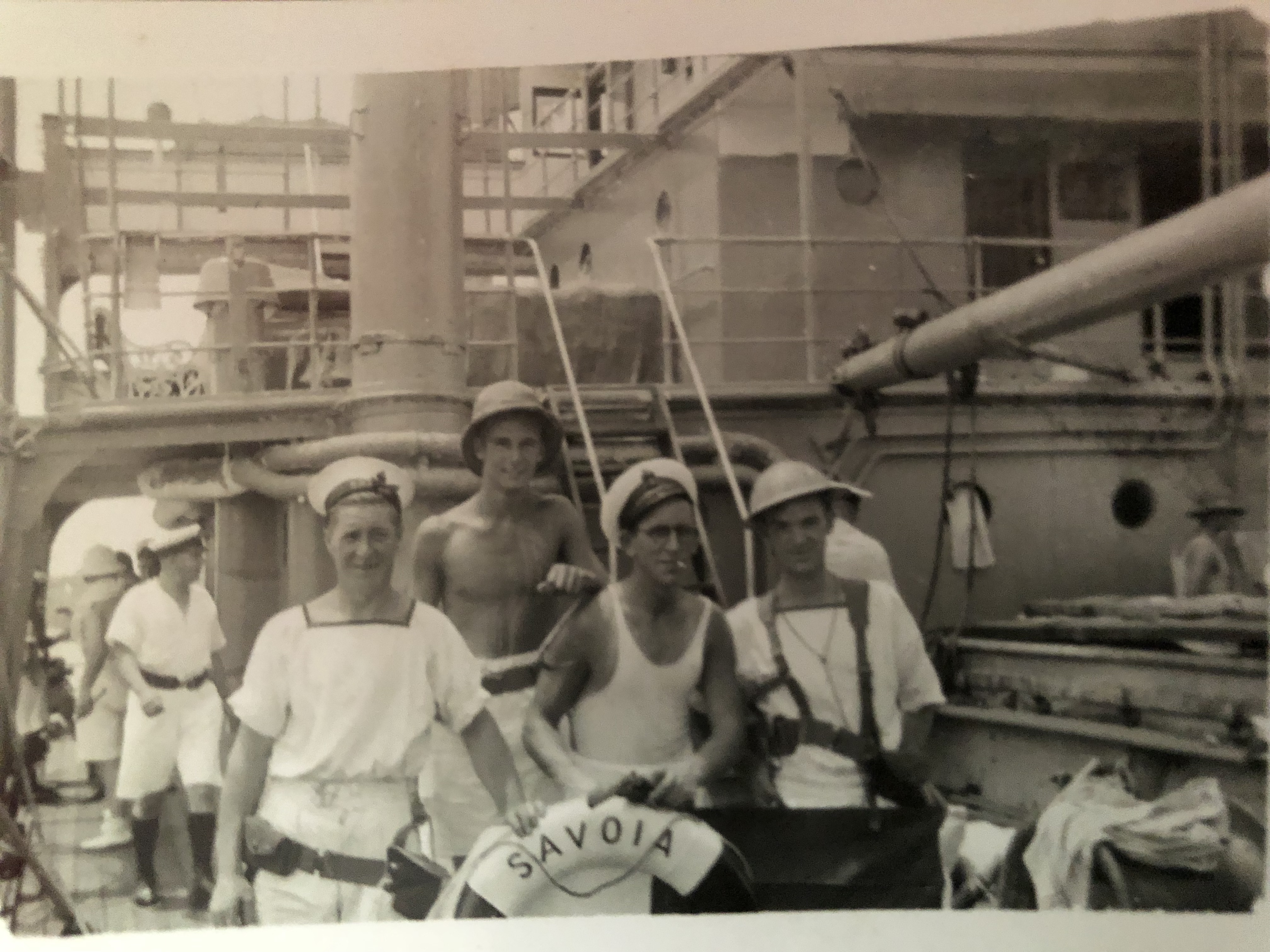
Members of HMS Hawkins' crew on deck aboard Savoia, posing with one of her lifebelts

HMS Hawkins diverted Savoia to Mombasa in Kenya, where she arrived on 14 February; the same day that British and Empire troops captured the port of Kismayo. The British placed her Italian crew in an internment camp, and took Savoia as a prize ship via South Africa and Freetown in Sierra Leone to Britain. She left Freetown in Convoy SL 92 on 6 November 1941, by which time she carried a cargo of whale oil, copper, and alcohol. SL 92 reached Liverpool on 1 December.

== Empire Arun ==
The UK Ministry of War Transport (MoWT) took ownership of Savoia, and early in 1942 renamed her Empire Arun, after the River Arun in West Sussex, and registered in London. Her UK official number was 159353, and her wireless call sign was BCXG. The MoWT appointed Union-Castle Line to manage her.

On 18 January 1942, Empire Arun left Liverpool carrying general cargo as a member of Convoy OS 17. However, she was involved in a collision off Islay, and had to return to port. She resumed her voyage with Convoy OS 21, which left Liverpool on 4 March, and reached Freetown on 24 March.

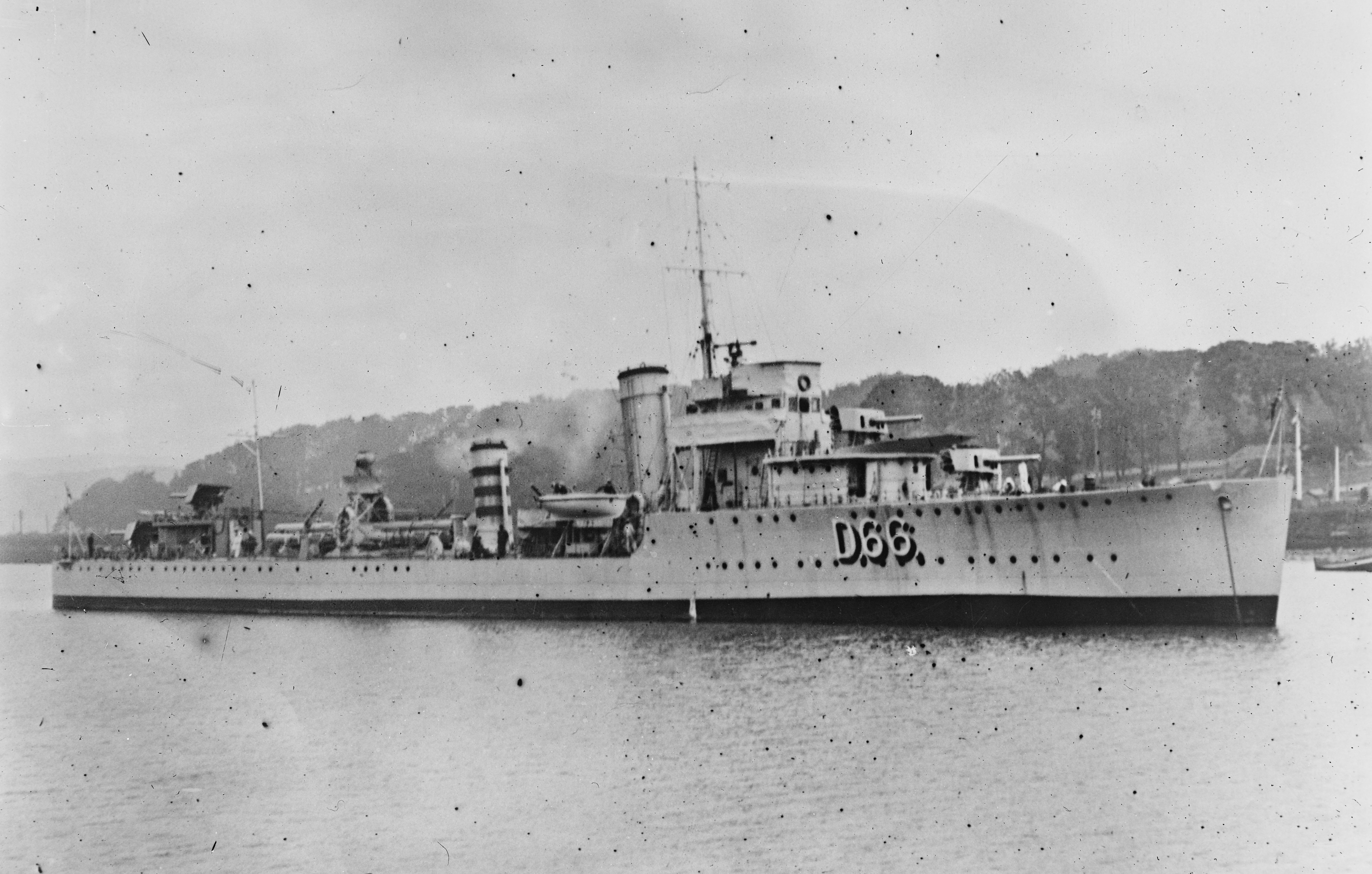
HMS Wivern in 1920

Empire Arun operated unescorted in the Gulf of Guinea, calling at Freetown on 19–20 April and 6–9 May. On 8 May, she received assistance at sea off Freetown from the destroyer HMS Wivern.

There is a gap in the records of her movements until early in 1943, when the ship left Freetown on 29 January in Convoy ST 54. On 4 February ST 54 reached Takoradi in the Gold Coast, where Empire Arun remained until 13 February. From there she sailed unescorted to Lagos in Nigeria, where she was in port until 7 March. From Lagos she crossed the South Atlantic to Rio de Janeiro and Santos in Brazil, arriving back off Freetown on 28 May. On 30 May she left Freetown in Convoy SL 130, which merged with Convoy MKS 14 on 11 June. On 21 June, just before SL 130 reached Liverpool, Empire Arun detached for Belfast Lough. There she joined Convoy BB 303 for Milford Haven. She detached from BB 303 to continue unescorted to Newport, Monmouthshire, where she arrived on 22 June.

Empire Arun loaded a cargo of coal in Newport, and on 13 September 1943 left unescorted for Milford Haven. There she joined Convoys OS 55 and KMS 27, which were outbound from Liverpool. OS 55 and KMS 27 split on 28 September. Empire Arun continued unescorted to Rio de Janeiro; Santos; and then Freetown, where she arrived on 19 November. By the time she left Freetown on 23 November, she was carrying general cargo, plus perishable goods in her refrigerated space. She left with Convoy SL 141, which merged with Convoy MKS 32 on 4 December, and reached Liverpool on 17 December.

On 12 February 1944, Empire Arun left Liverpool with Convoy ONS 29, which was bound for Halifax, Nova Scotia. There she joined Convoy XB 98, which was bound for Boston. She detached from XB 98, and continued unescorted via the Cape Cod Canal. On 3 March she reached New York, where she remained in port until 22 March. She returned via the Cape Cod Canal; joined Convoy BX 101 from Boston to Halifax; and then joined Convoy SC 156 from Halifax, which reached Liverpool on 14 April.

On 26 April 1944, Empire Arun left Liverpool with Convoy ON 234 to New York, where she was in port from 12 May until 2 June. She loaded general cargo and explosives, and returned with Convoy HX 294, which reached Liverpool on 19 June.

On 2–3 July 1944, Empire Arun crossed from Liverpool to Belfast Lough. There she joined Convoy ON 243, which reached New York on 18 July. She loaded general cargo, and returned with Convoy HX 303, which left New York on 11 August. Before HX 303 reached Liverpool, Empire Arun detached for Loch Ewe, where she joined Convoy WN 626 to the Firth of Forth off Methil. There she joined Convoy FN 1491, which took her to the Thames Estuary off Southend-on-Sea, where she arrived on 1 September.

On 25 September 1944, Empire Arun left the Thames Estuary with Convoy FN 1491, which reached the Firth of Forth off Methil on 27 September. On 29 September she reached Loch Ewe. Which convoy took her across the North Atlantic is not recorded, but on 12 October she left Halifax with Convoy XB 129A, and then continued unescorted via the Cape Cod Canal. She was in New York from 17 October until 12 November, and Boston from 13 to 22 November. She left with Convoy BX 134, which reached Halifax on 25 November. She left Halifax on 2 December with Convoy SC 162, by which time she was carrying steel and general cargo. SC 162 reached Liverpool on 17 December.

On 29 January 1945, Empire Arun left Liverpool carrying general cargo and explosives. She sailed with Convoy ONS 41 to Halifax; then Convoy XB 146 to Boston; and then continued unescorted via the Cape Cod Canal. She was in New York from 23 February until 4 March, and then in Hampton Roads off the coast of Virginia on 18–19 March. She returned unescorted to Boston, where she joined Convoy BX 152 to Halifax. There she joined Convoy SC 171, which was headed for Liverpool. She detached from SC 171 to join Convoy BTC 125, which was going from Milford Haven to the Thames Estuary off Southend. She arrived off Southend on 14 April.

On 6 May 1945, Empire Arun left the Thames Estuary with Convoy TBC 150, which reached Milford Haven on 9 May. There she joined Convoy MH 108/2, which was headed for the Firth of Clyde. She detached for Belfast Lough, where she arrived on 10 May. On 12 May she left Belfast Lough with Convoy ONS 50, which reached Halifax on 29 May. Germany surrendered on 4 May, so Empire Arun's remaining wartime voyages were all unescorted. She reached Pointe-au-Père, Quebec on 29 May; left Montreal on 16 June; and reached Manchester on 1 July.

On 20 July 1945 Empire Arun left Liverpool. She called at Boston on 2 August, and was in Philadelphia from 4 to 17 August. She was in Brest, France from 3 to 11 September, and Cardiff from 12 to 13 September. She was in Hampton Roads on 14–15 October, and Savannah, Georgia from 17 to 25 October. She was in the Firth of Clyde from 11 November to 7 December, and reached Liverpool on 8 December.

== Granlake and Dryad ==
In 1946 the Ministry of Transport (MoT) succeeded the MoWT, and in 1947 the MoT sold Empire Arun to the Ormos Shipping Company of London, which renamed the ship Granlake. Ormos was run by Leonidas J Goulandris (1902–52); a member of a Greek shipping family based in London.

In 1949, ownership of the ship passed to Compañía Maritima del Este SA, which renamed her Dryad. She was registered under the Panamanian flag of convenience, and her call sign was HOMW. Her refrigerating equipment seems to have been decommissioned and removed, which increased her tonnages to 5,905 GRT and 4,149 NRT. Goulandris Brothers were her managers.

== Japanese career ==
On 20 July 1951, Hikari Kisen KK bought Dryad and renamed her Shiranesan Maru, after Mount Nikkō-Shirane. She was registered in Tokyo; her Japanese official number was 67467; and her call sign was JGPR. By 1953, Hikari Kisen had Shiranesan Maru re-engined. Her original turbines were replaced with a set of second-hand engines that Uraga Dock Company of Yokosuka had built in 1938. They were a four-cylinder compound engine plus exhaust steam turbine. Steam from the two low-pressure cylinders of her reciprocating engine drove the turbine, which drove the same propeller shaft via double-reduction gearing. Also by 1953, the ship had been equipped with an echo sounding device. Her tonnages were revised again, to 5,736 GRT and 4,119 NRT.

By 1954, Mitsui Kinkai Kisen KK & Others had acquired Shiranesan Maru, and she was registered in Kobe. On 26 July 1955, Hokuyo Suisan KK ("Hokuyo Fisheries") had acquired her, and her registration was reverted to Tokyo. Hokuyo used her as a factory ship for canning crabs.

In 1962, Nichiro Gyogyo KK ("Nichiro Fishery") acquired the ship, and renamed her Dainichi Maru. She was used for canning shellfish. By 1967, the romanised spelling of her name had been revised to Tainichi Maru, and her tonnages had been revised to 5,859 GRT; 3,503 NRT; and 8,478 DWT. In 1969 the International Maritime Organization introduced seven-figure IMO numbers. Tainichi Maru's new number was 5349334. In the same year, she was sold for scrap. On 9 August she arrived at Utsumi-Machi to be broken up.

== Bibliography ==
- Dupuis, Dobrillo (1975). Forzate il blocco! L'odissea delle navi italiane rimaste fuori degli stretti allo scoppio della guerra (in Italian). Milan: Edizione Mursia.
- Lloyd's Register of Shipping. Vol. II.–Steamers & Motor Vessels. London: Lloyd's Register of Shipping. 1923 – via Internet Archive.
- Lloyd's Register of Shipping. Vol. II.–Steamers & Motorships. London: Lloyd's Register of Shipping. 1924 – via Internet Archive.
- Lloyd's Register of Shipping. Vol. II.–Steamers & Motor Ships. London: Lloyd's Register of Shipping. 1926 – via Internet Archive.
- Lloyd's Register of Shipping. Vol. I.–Steamers and Motorships under 300 tons, trawlers, tugs, dredgers, &c. London: Lloyd's Register of Shipping. 1930 – via Southampton City Council.
- Lloyd's Register of Shipping. Vol. II.–Steamers and Motorships of 300 tons gross and over. London: Lloyd's Register of Shipping. 1933 – via Southampton City Council.
- Lloyd's Register of Shipping. Vol. II.–Steamers and Motorships of 300 tons gross and over. London: Lloyd's Register of Shipping. 1934 – via Southampton City Council.
- Lloyd's Register of Shipping. Vol. I.–Steamers & Motorships under 300 tons, trawlers, tugs, dredgers, &c. London: Lloyd's Register of Shipping. 1936 – via Southampton City Council.
- Lloyd's Register of Shipping. Vol. II.–Steamers and Motorships of 300 tons gross and over. London: Lloyd's Register of Shipping. 1937 – via Southampton City Council.
- Lloyd's Register of Shipping. Vol. II.–Steamers and Motorships of 300 tons gross and over. London: Lloyd's Register of Shipping. 1942 – via Southampton City Council.
- Lloyd's Register of Shipping. Vol. Steamers and Motorships of 300 tons gross and over. London: Lloyd's Register of Shipping. 1947 – via Internet Archive.
- Lloyd's Register of Shipping. Vol. I. A–L. London: Lloyd's Register of Shipping. 1948 – via Internet Archive.
- Lloyd's Register of Shipping. Vol. II. M–Z. London: Lloyd's Register of Shipping. 1951 – via Internet Archive.
- Lloyd's Register of Shipping. Vol. II. M–Z. London: Lloyd's Register of Shipping. 1952 – via Internet Archive.
- Lloyd's Register of Shipping. Vol. II. M–Z. London: Lloyd's Register of Shipping. 1954 – via Internet Archive.
- Mercantile Navy List. London: Registrar General of Shipping and Seamen. 1947 – via Crew List Index Project.
- Mitchell, WH; Sawyer, LA (1995). The Empire Ships. London, New York, Hamburg, Hong Kong: Lloyd's of London Press Ltd. ISBN 1-85044-275-4.
- Notarangelo, Rolando; Pagano, Gian Paolo (1997). Navi mercantili perdute. Rome: Ufficio Storico della Marina Militare. ISBN 978-8898485222.
- Register Book. Vol. I. Register of Ships. London: Lloyd's Register of Shipping. 1955 – via Internet Archive.
- Register Book. Vol. I. Register of Ships. London: Lloyd's Register of Shipping. 1967 – via Internet Archive.
- Theotokas, I; Harlaftis, G (2009). Leadership in World Shipping: Greek Family Firms in International Business. London: Palgrave Macmillan. ISBN 978-0-230-23353-9.
