= Nicholas J. Goulandris =

Greek shipowner (1891–1957)

- Born: 1891
- Died: 1957 (aged 65–66)
- Occupation: shipowner
- Known for: founder of N. J. Goulandris
- Spouse: Elisa Karadontis
- Children: John, Leonidas, and Alexandros

Nicholas J. Goulandris (1891–1957) was a Greek shipowner, the founder of N. J. Goulandris.

He was the fourth of five sons of shipowner Ioannis P. Goulandris (1840-1928).

In 1952, he left the family firm, Goulandris Bros., and founded N. J. Goulandris in London. It grew with the help of his sons John (b.1923) and twins Leonidas (b. 1927) and Alexandros (1927-2017), and by 1958 was the sixth-largest Greek shipowner with 40 ships. The business is now known as Andriaki Shipping and is based in Marousi, Athens.
