= Nikos Goulandris =

- Born: Nikolaos Goulandris; 6 September 1913; Andros, Greece
- Died: 6 August 1983 (aged 69); Philadelphia, United States
- Occupation: Shipowner
- Known for: President of Olympiacos F.C.
- Relatives: Vassilis P. "Basil" Goulandris (brother)

Nikos (Nikolaos) Goulandris (Greek: Νίκος Γουλανδρής, 1913–1983) was a Greek businessman and president of Olympiacos F.C.

He was the son of Peter J Goulandris and Chrysa Dambassi.

He had a twin brother Basil Goulandris (1913–94), elder brothers John (1907–50) and George (1908–74) and a younger brother Constantine (1916–78).

Goulandris began his involvement with Olympiacos in 1970, becoming its general manager in 1971 and president in 1972. As president, he reinstated all the prominent Olympiacos board members who had been forced out by the military regime (including Giorgos Andrianopoulos) and introduced member elections, establishing a new and trustworthy board of directors. He appointed Lakis Petropoulos as head coach and signed high-caliber players, building a strong roster. Under Goulandris' presidency, Olympiacos won the Greek Championship three times in a row (1972–73, 1973–74, 1974–75), combining it with the Greek Cup in 1973 and 1975 to celebrate two Doubles in three years. In the 1972–73 season, Olympiacos won the title while conceding only 13 goals in 34 matches, an all-time record in Greek football history. The team's best year though, was undoubtedly the 1973–74 season, when Olympiacos won the league with 26 wins and 7 draws in 34 games, scoring an all-time record of 102 goals and conceding only 14.

Nikos Goulandris is widely considered as one of the greatest presidents in the history of Olympiacos. He died in 1983. According to legend, it is said his final words were:

"I'm not sad about my upcoming death. What actually saddens me, is the fact that I won't be able to watch my beloved Olympiacos"

— Nikos Goulandris

The "Nikolaos Goulandris" plaque, given to supporters of Olympiacos F.C., is named in his honour.

The Goulandris Museum of Cycladic Art was founded in 1986 to house the collection of Cycladic and Ancient Greek art formed by Goulandris and his wife Aikaterini (Dolly) Goulandris.
