= John Coumantaros =

Greek-American businessman

- Born: John George Coumantaros; 1961 (age 64–65)
- Education: Yale University
- Occupation: businessman
- Title: chairman of Flour Mills of Nigeria
- Parent(s): George S. Coumantaros; Sophie Coumantaros

John George Coumantaros (born 1961) is a Greek-American businessman, the chairman of Flour Mills of Nigeria (FMN) since 2014, and its former CEO.

== Early life ==
He was born in 1961, the son of George S. Coumantaros, who founded FMN in 1960. Coumantaros attended the Buckley School (New York City), the Hotchkiss School and has a bachelor's degree in history from Yale University.

== Career ==
Coumantaros began his career in 1984 with Southern Star Shipping (owned by his father), and has been president since 2009.

He has been president of Load Line Capital LLC, and a director of Oxbow Carbon LLC since 2007.
