= Goulandris Museum of Cycladic Art =

Archaeological museum in Athens, Greece

Museum of Cycladic Art
- Μουσείο Κυκλαδικής Τέχνης
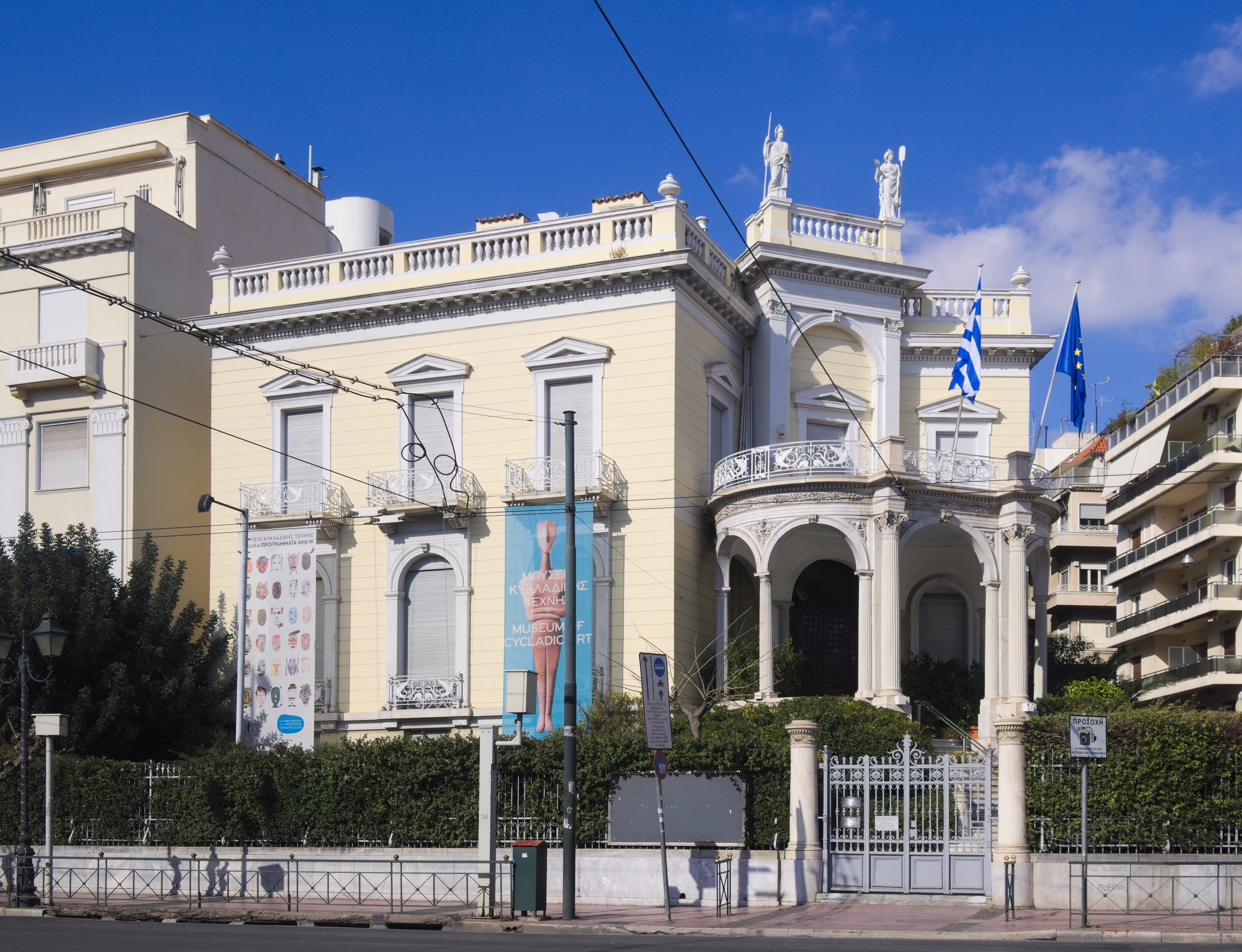
- The Stathatos Mansion houses the temporary exhibits of the Museum of Cycladic Art
- Interactive fullscreen map
- Established: 1986
- Location: 4, Neophytou Douka str., Athens, Greece
- Coordinates: 37°58′33″N 23°44′32″E
- Collections: artifacts of Cycladic art
- Founders: Nikolaos and Dolly Goulandris
- President: Sandra Marinopoulou
- Public transit access: Evangelismos station bus
- Website: www.cycladic.gr

The Nikolaos P. Goulandris Foundation - Museum of Cycladic Art (Greek: Μουσείο Κυκλαδικής τέχνης) is a museum in Athens that houses a notable collection of artifacts of Cycladic art.

The museum was founded in 1986 in order to house the collection of Cycladic and Ancient Greek art belonging to Nikolaos and Dolly Goulandris. Starting in the early 1960s, the couple collected Greek antiquities, with special interest in the prehistoric art from the Cyclades islands of the Aegean Sea. The museum's main building, erected in the centre of Athens in 1985, was designed by the Greek architect Ioannis Vikelas. In 1991, the Museum acquired a new building, the neo-classical Stathatos Mansion at the corner of Vassilissis Sofias Avenue and Herodotou Street.

The museum's permanent collection includes over 3,000 items, and was described in The New York Times as "one of the world's most significant privately assembled collections of Cycladic antiquities."

== Exhibitions ==
Goulandris Museum of Cycladic Art main building

Temporary exhibits are housed in the Stathatos Mansion. The museum's temporary exhibitions have included some of the most important Greek and international modern and contemporary artists.

- October 2002 – February 2003: Salvador Dalí - Myth and Singularity
- April–July 2006: Caravaggio - Caravaggio and the 17th Century
- November 2006 – January 2007: Opy Zouni - Itineraries through light and colour
- October 2007 – January 2008: El Greco - El Greco and his Workshop/El Greco y su taller
- June–September 2009: Thomas Struth
- September–October 2009: Palle Nielsen Man, Dream and Fear - Orpheus and Eurydice Through the Eyes of Palle Nielsen
- May–September 2010: Louise Bourgeois - Personages
- April–September 2012: Jannis Kounellis
- May–October 2012: Ugo Rondinone - Nude
- October 2013 – January 2014: Martin Kippenberger - Martin Kippenberger: A cry for freedom
- October 2015 – January 2016: Mario Merz - Numbers are prehistoric
- March–May 2016: Wols and Eileen Quinlan - Always stars with encounter | Wols / Eileen Quinlan
- May–October 2016: Ai Weiwei - Ai Weiwei at Cycladic
- May–September 2017: Cy Twombly and Greek antiquity. Part of the Divine Dialogues exhibition series.
- November 2017 – February 2018: Mike Kelley - Mike Kelley: Fortress of Solitude
- June–October 2018: George Condo - George Condo at Cycladic
- July–October 2018: Paul Chan - Paul Chan | Odysseus and the Bathers
- June–October 2019 : Picasso and Antiquity - Line and clay. Part of the Divine Dialogues exhibition series
- November 2019 – March 2020: Lynda Benglis – Lynda Benglis: In the Realm of the Senses
- May–November 2024: Cindy Sherman at Cycladic: Early Works

== Gallery ==
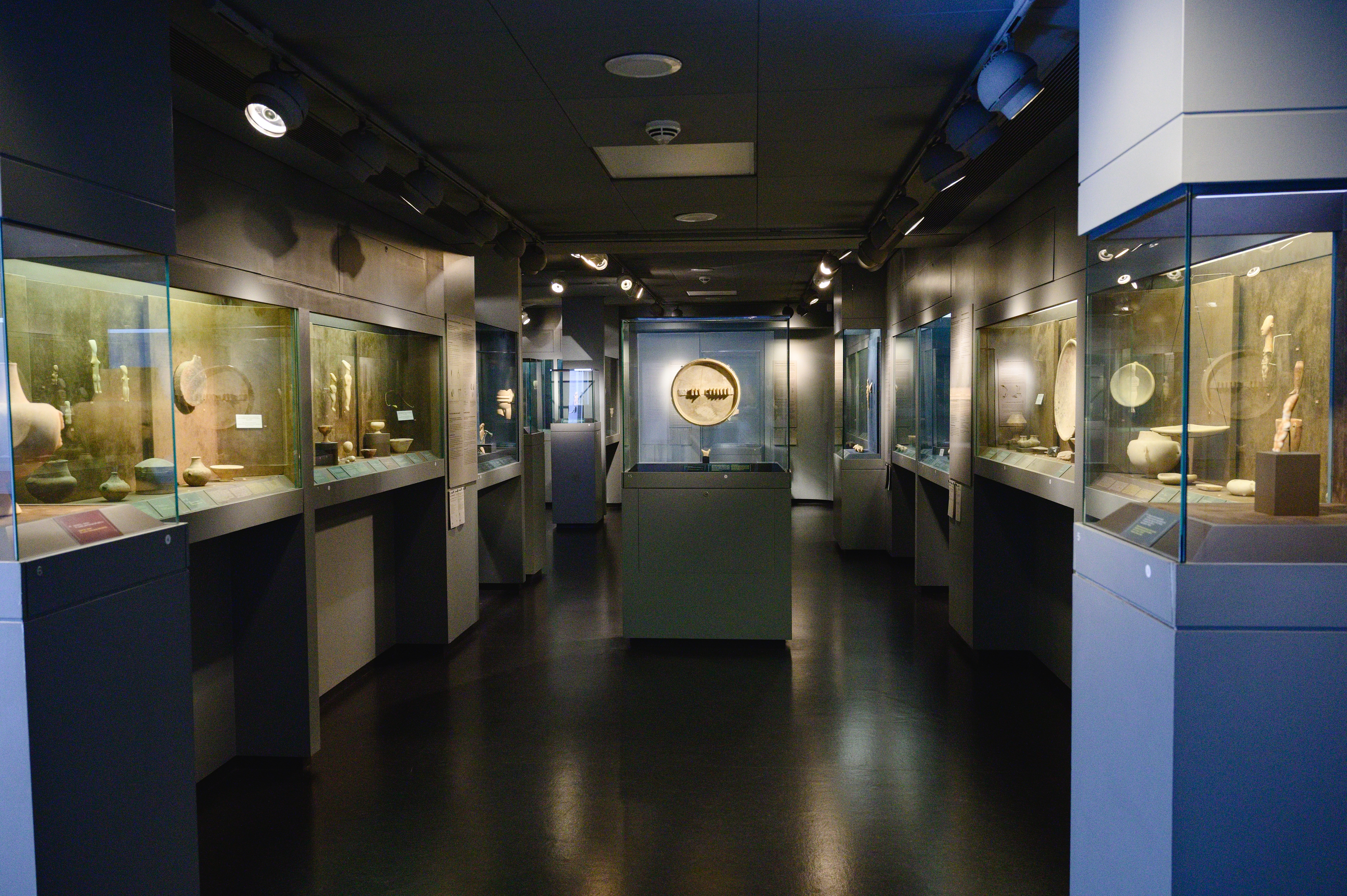
Museum interior; near the beginning of the Early Cycladic part of the exposition.

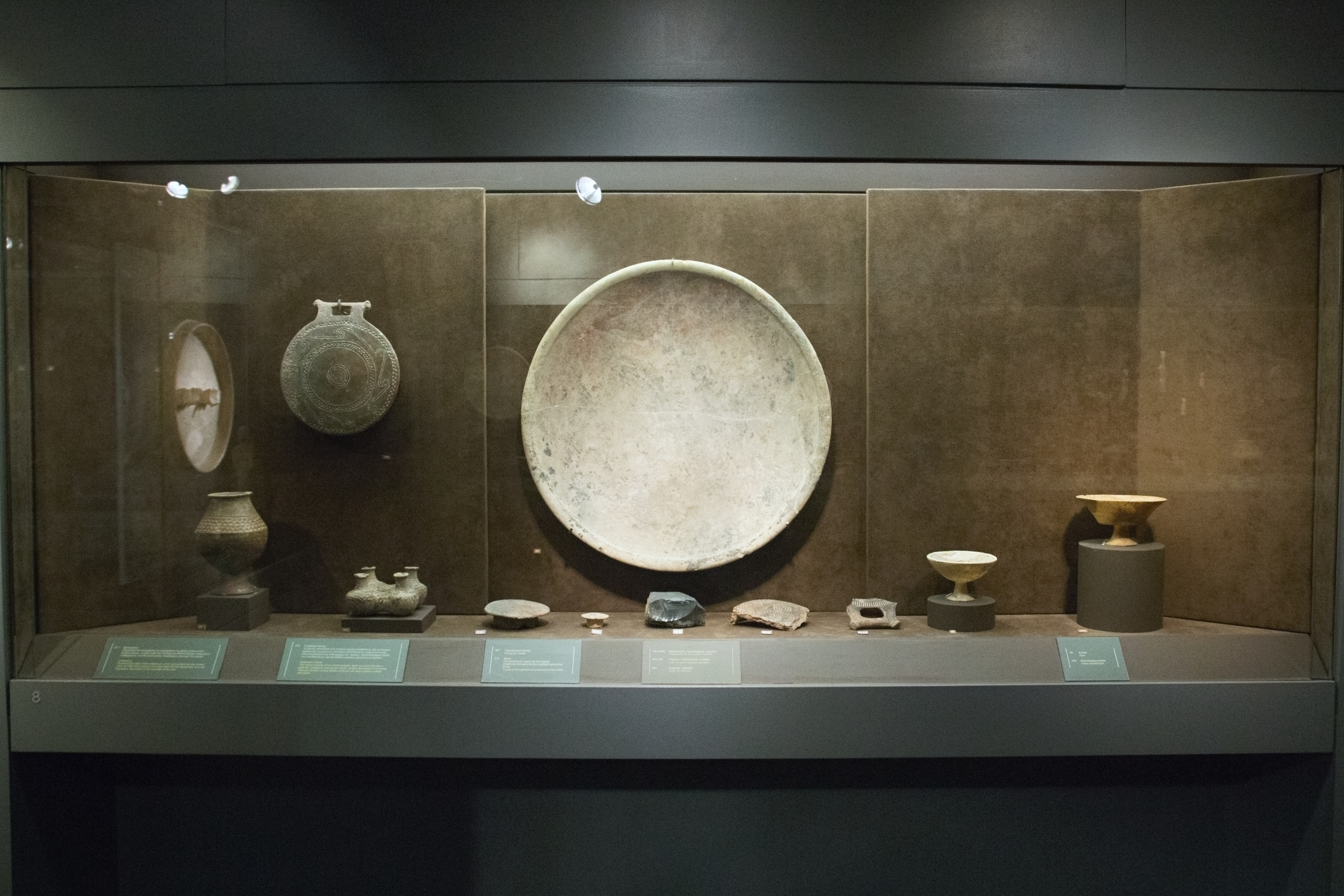
Museum interior; display case of Early Cycladic II findings

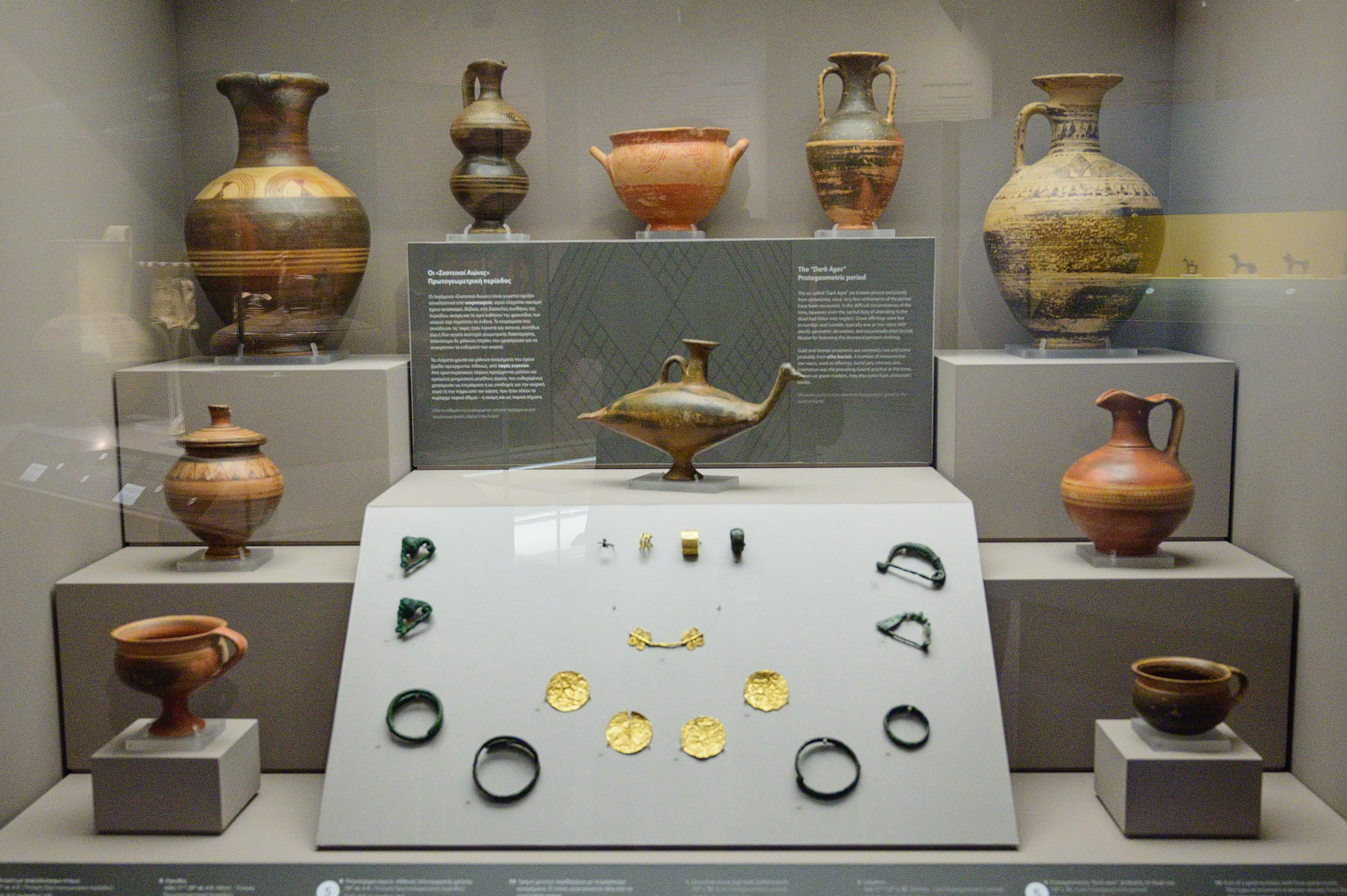
Display case of pottery and jewelry from the Protogeometric period

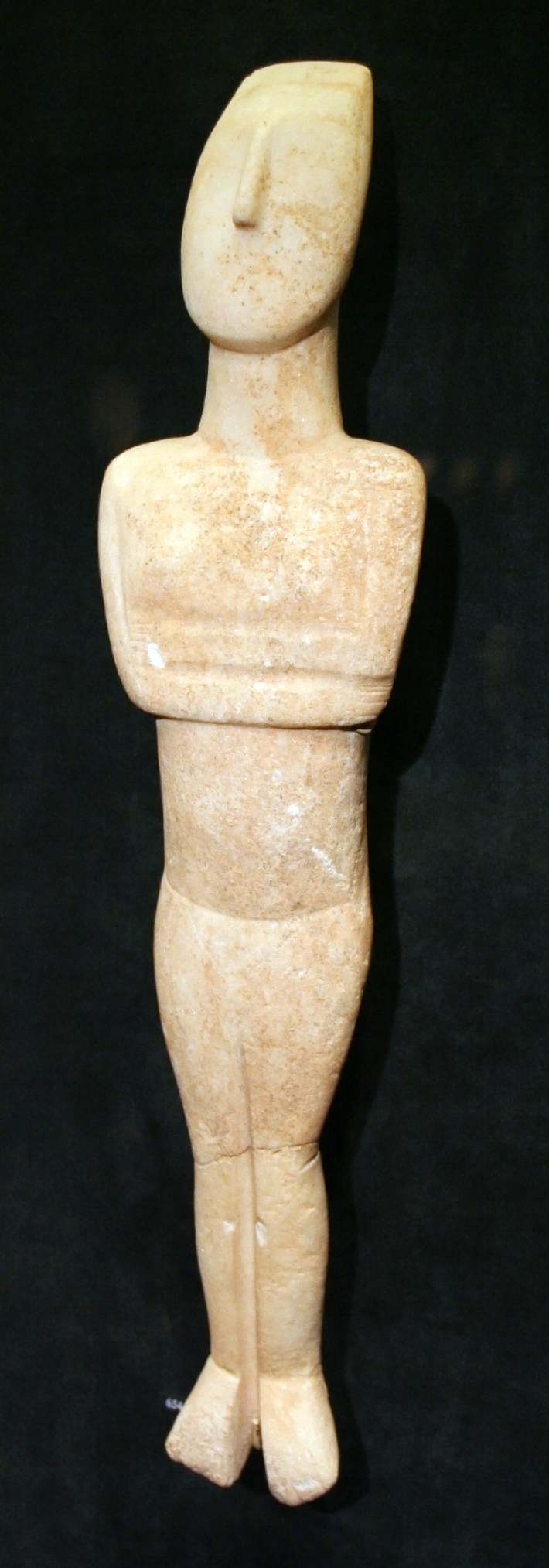
Cycladic figurine on display at the museum

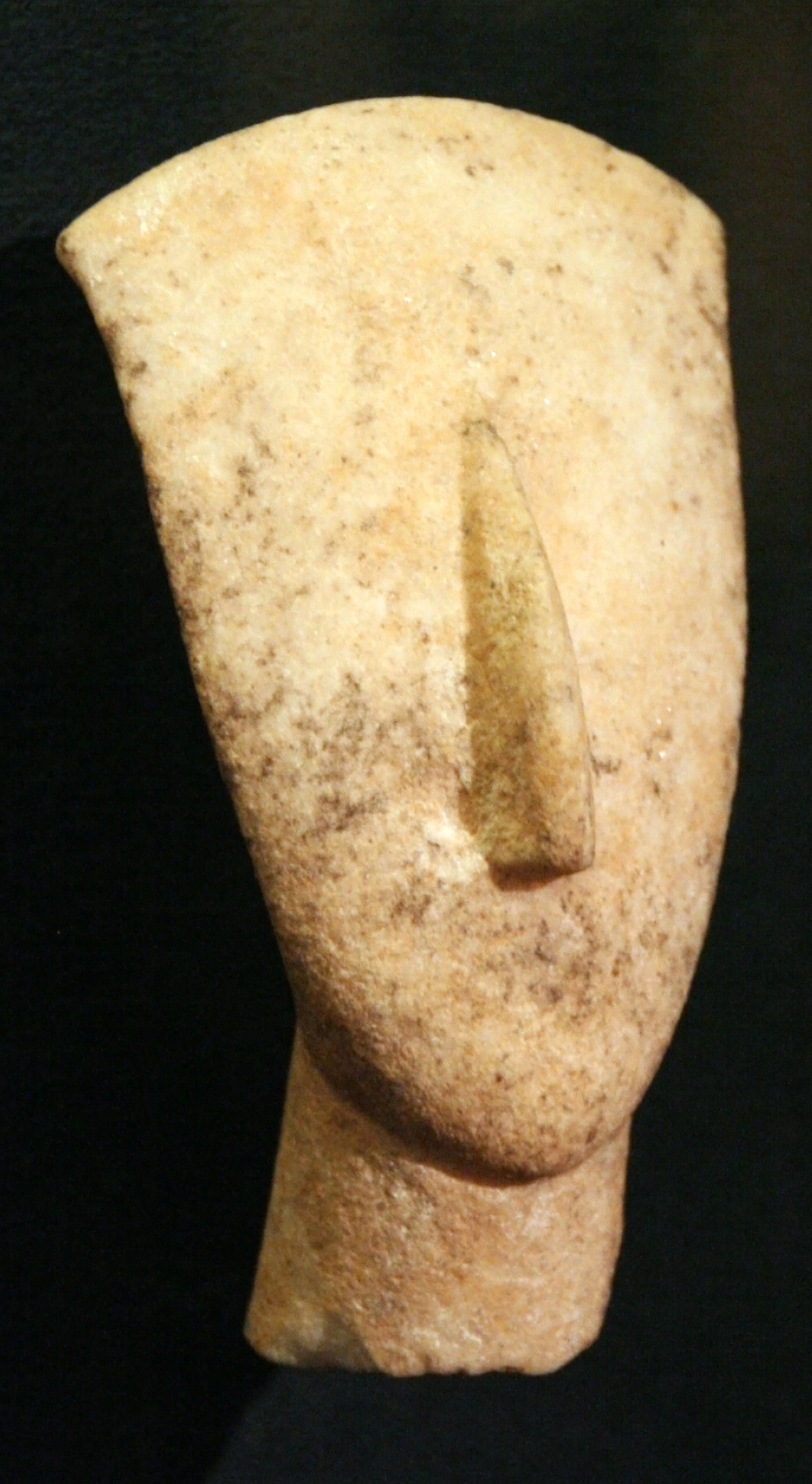
Head and neck of a figurine attributed to the Schuster Master

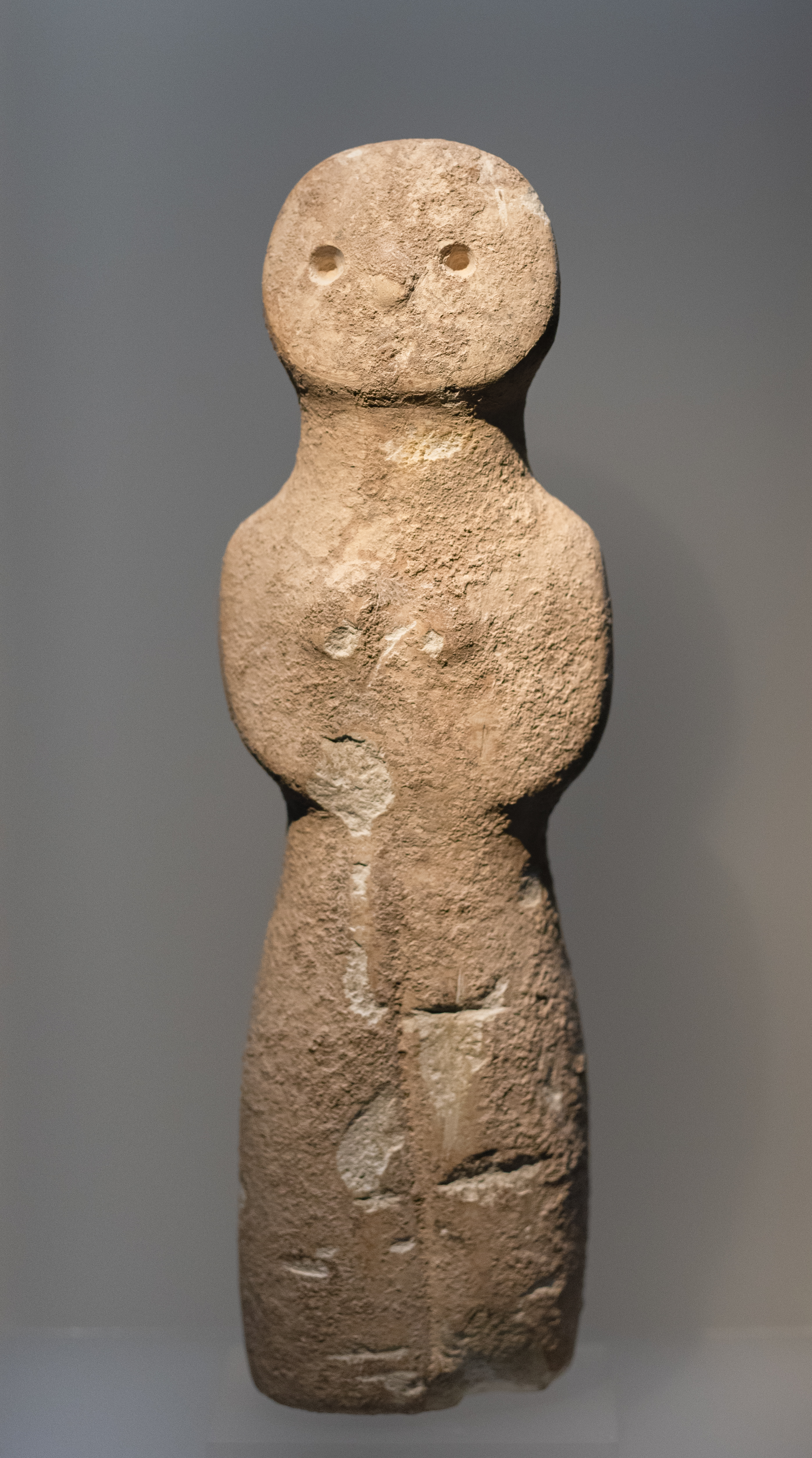
Zintilis Idol

== See also ==
- Cycladic art
- Cycladic civilization
- List of museums in Greece
